= Bent metallocene =

Chemical compound

In organometallic chemistry, bent metallocenes are a subset of metallocenes. In bent metallocenes, the ring systems coordinated to the metal are not parallel, but are tilted at an angle. A common example of a bent metallocene is Cp_{2}TiCl_{2}. Several reagents and much research is based on bent metallocenes.

== Synthesis ==
Like regular metallocenes, bent metallocenes are synthesized by a variety of methods but most typically by reaction of sodium cyclopentadienide with the metal halide. This method applies to the synthesis of the bent metallocene dihalides of titanium, zirconium, hafnium, and vanadium:

2 NaC_{5}H_{5} + TiCl_{4} → (C_{5}H_{5})_{2}TiCl_{2} + 2 NaCl

In the earliest work in this area, Grignard reagents were used to deprotonate the cyclopentadiene.

Niobocene dichloride, featuring Nb(IV), is prepared via a multistep reaction that begins with a Nb(V) precursor:

NbCl_{5} + 6 NaC_{5}H_{5} → 5 NaCl + (C_{5}H_{5})_{4}Nb + organic products
(C_{5}H_{5})_{4}Nb + 2 HCl + 0.5 O_{2}) → [{C_{5}H_{5})_{2}NbCl}_{2}O]Cl_{2} + 2 C_{5}H_{6}
2 HCl + [{(C_{5}H_{5})_{2}NbCl}_{2}O]Cl_{2} + SnCl_{2} → 2 (C_{5}H_{5})2NbCl_{2} + SnCl_{4} + H_{2}O

Bent metallocene dichlorides of molybdenum and tungsten are also prepared via indirect routes that involve redox at the metal centres.

Bent metallocenes

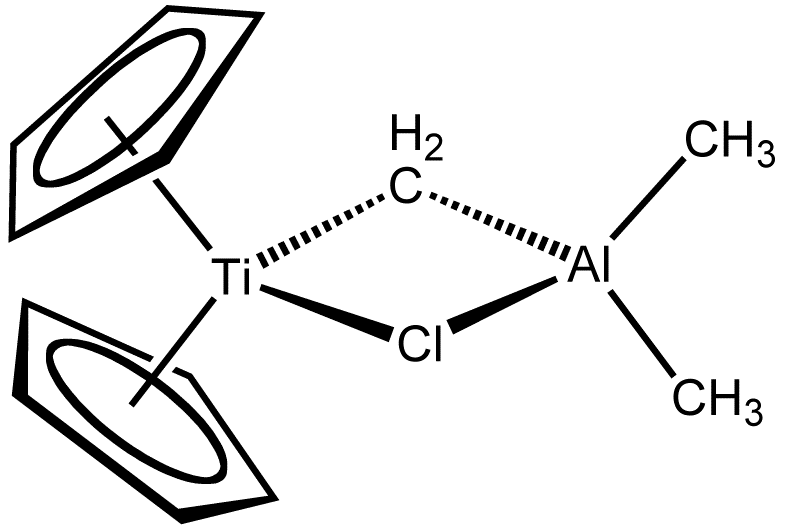
Tebbe's reagent

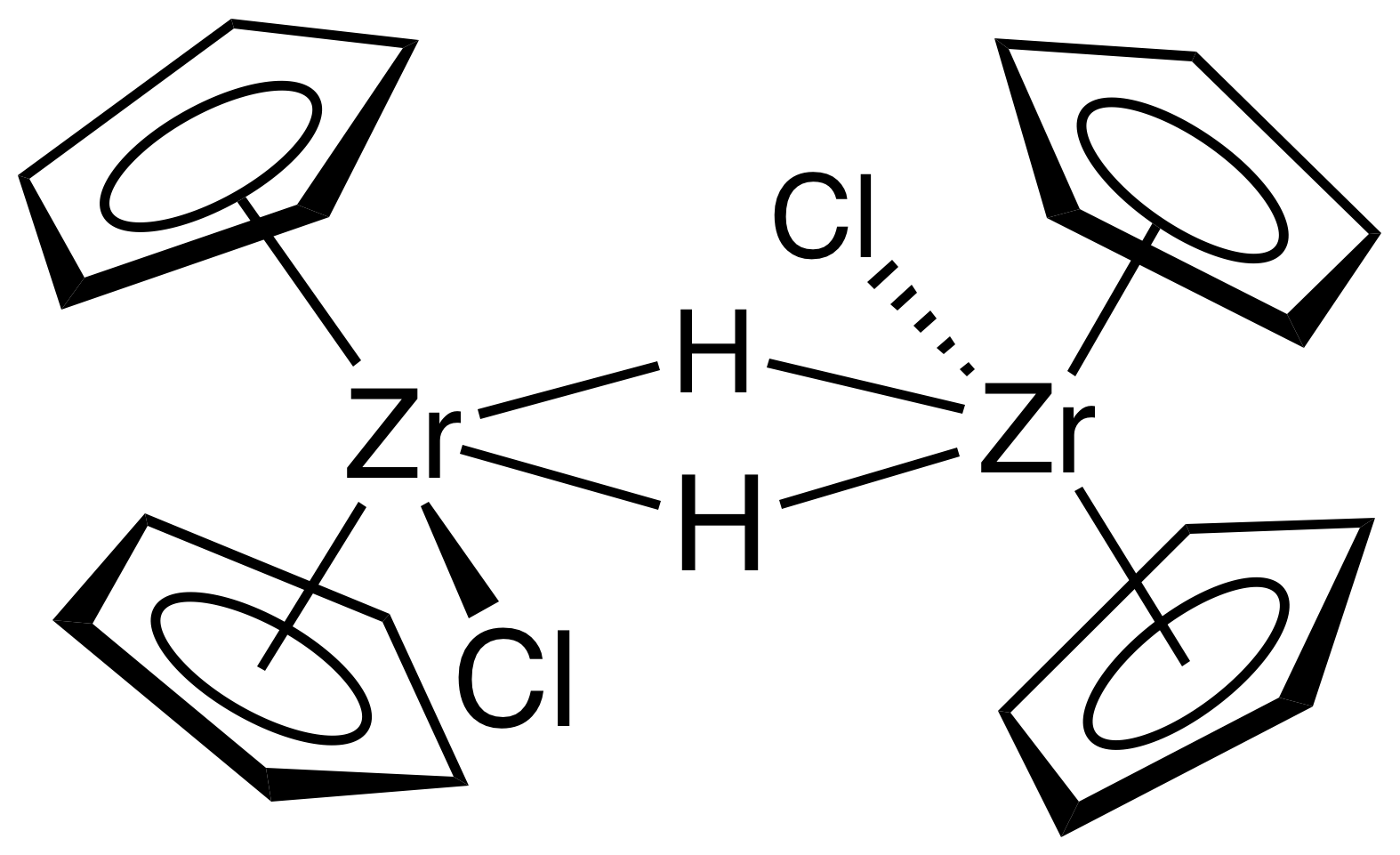
Schwartz's reagent.

Ansa-metallocene, X is the linker group, often (CH_{2})_{n} or R_{2}Si (R = alkyl)

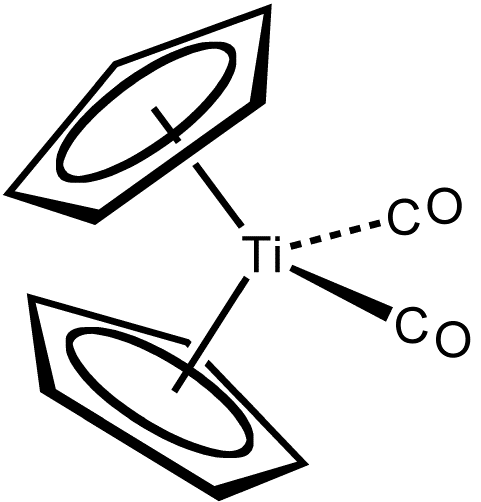
Titanocene dicarbonyl.

== Structure and bonding ==
Bent metallocenes have idealized C_{2v} symmetry. The non-Cp ligands are arrayed in the wedge area. For bent metallocenes with the formula Cp_{2}ML_{2}, the L-M-L angle depends on the electron count. In the d^{2}-complex molybdocene dichloride (Cp_{2}MoCl_{2}) the Cl-Mo-Cl angle is 82°. In the d^{1} complex niobocene dichloride, this angle is more open at 85.6°. In the d^{0}-complex zirconocene dichloride the angle is even more open at 92.1°. This trend reveals that the frontier orbital, which is d_{z2}, is oriented in the MCl_{2} plane but does not bisect the MCl_{2} angle.

== Reactivity ==
=== Salt metathesis reactions ===
Bent metallocenes typically have other ligands, often halides, which are centers of reactivity. For example, reduction of zirconocene dichloride gives the corresponding hydrido chloride called Schwartz's reagent:

(C_{5}H_{5})_{2}ZrCl_{2} + 1/4 LiAlH_{4} → (C_{5}H_{5})_{2}ZrHCl + 1/4 "LiAlCl_{4}"

Related titanium-based complexes Petasis reagent and Tebbe's reagent also feature bent metallocenes. Alkyne and benzyne derivatives of titanocene are reagents in organic synthesis.

=== Reactions of Cp rings ===
Although the Cp ligands are generally safely considered spectator ligands, they are not completely inert. For example, attempts to prepare titanocene by reduction of titanocene dichloride affords complexes of fulvalene ligands.

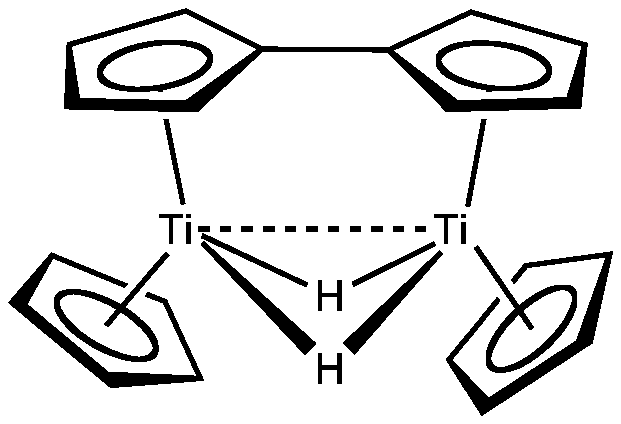
"Titanocene" is not Ti(C_{5}H_{5})_{2}, but this fulvalene dihydride complex.

Bent metallocenes derived from pentamethylcyclopentadiene can undergo reactions involving the methyl groups. For example, decamethyltungstocene dihydride undergoes dehydrogenation to give the tuck-in complex.

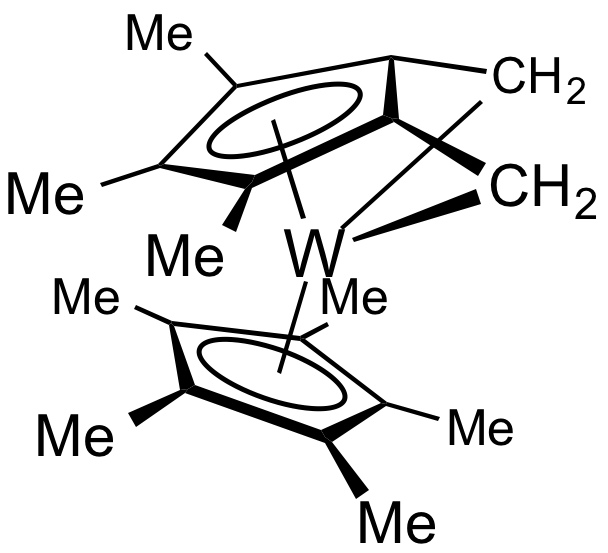
Double tuck-in complexes, such as this derivative of decamethyltungstocene, are typical products of bent metallocenes.

The original example proceeded via sequential loss of two equivalents of H_{2} from decamethyltungstocene dihydride, Cp*_{2}WH_{2}. The first dehydrogenation step affords a simple tuck-in complex:

(C_{5}Me_{5})_{2}WH_{2} → (C_{5}Me_{5})(C_{5}Me_{3}(CH_{2})_{2})W + 2 H_{2}

=== Redox ===
When the non-Cp ligands are halides, these complexes undergo reduction to give carbonyl, alkene, and alkyne complexes that are useful reagents. A well-known example is titanocene dicarbonyl:

Cp_{2}TiCl_{2} + Mg + 2 CO → Cp_{2}Ti(CO)_{2} + MgCl_{2}

Reduction of vanadocene dichloride gives vanadocene.

=== Olefin polymerization catalysis ===
Although bent metallocenes are of no commercial value as olefin polymerization catalysts, studies on these compounds were highly influential on the industrial processes. Already in 1957 there were reports on the polymerization of ethylene using a catalyst prepared from Cp_{2}TiCl_{2} and trimethyl aluminium. Reactions involving the related Cp_{2}Zr_{2}Cl_{2}/Al(CH_{3})_{3} system revealed the beneficial effects of trace amounts of water for ethylene polymerization. It is now known that the partially hydrolyzed organoaluminium reagent methylaluminoxane ("MAO") gives rise to families of highly active catalysts. Work in this area led to constrained geometry complexes, which are not bent metallocenes, but exhibit related structural features.
