= Organovanadium chemistry =

Organovanadium chemistry is the chemistry of organometallic compounds containing a carbon (C) to vanadium (V) chemical bond. Organovanadium compounds find only minor use as reagents in organic synthesis but are significant for polymer chemistry as catalysts.

Oxidation states for vanadium are +2, +3, +4 and +5. Low valency vanadium is usually stabilized with carbonyl ligands. Oxo derivatives are relatively common, unlike the organic complexes of neighboring elements.

== Compound classes ==
=== Carbonyls ===
Vanadium carbonyl can be prepared by reductive carbonylation of vanadium salts:

4 Na + VCl_{3} + 6 CO → Na[V(CO)_{6}] + 3 NaCl

The salt can be oxidized to the 17e binary carbonyl V(CO)_{6}.

Conversely, reduction gives the V(CO)^{3−}_{5} anion. The rubidium and cesium salts are stable at room temperature, but not the sodium salt. Soft electrophiles attack the anion to give heptacoordinate and octacoordinate cluster complexes.

=== Cyclopentadienyl derivatives ===
(Cycloheptatrienyl)(cyclopentadienyl)vanadium is one of many organovanadium compounds that is paramagnetic.

Vanadocene dichloride, the first organovanadium complexes to be reported, is prepared from sodium cyclopentadienyl and vanadium tetrachloride:

2 NaC_{5}H_{5} + VCl_{4} → VCp_{2}Cl_{2} + 2NaCl

Reduction of this compound gives the parent vanadocene (Cp_{2}V):

VCp_{2}Cl_{2} + LiAlH_{4} → VCp_{2}

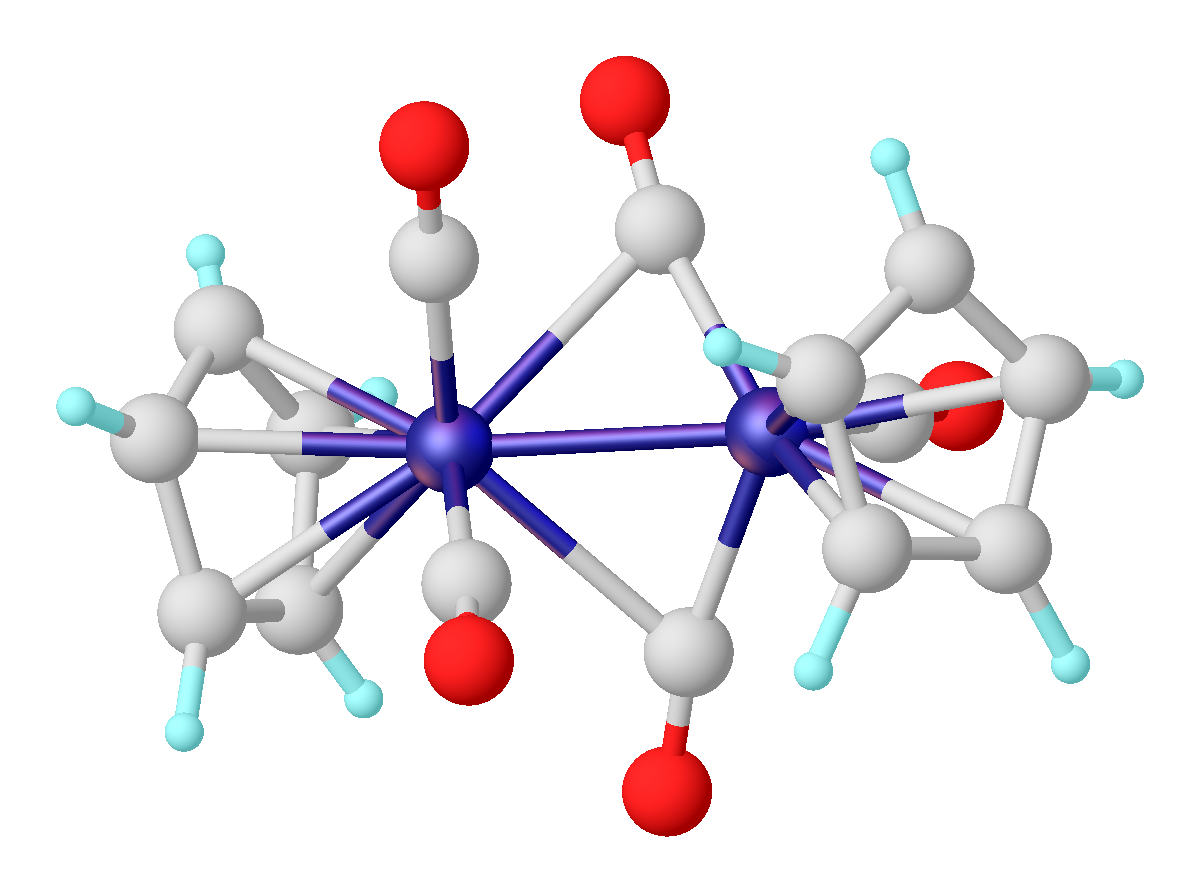
Cp_{2}V_{2}(CO)_{5} featuring a pair of semi-bridging CO ligands.

Vanadocene is the lightest transition metal metallocene that is isolable at room temperature. Vanadocene reacts with high pressures of carbon monoxide to give CpV(CO)_{4}. Photolysis of the tetracarbonyl gives Cp_{2}V_{2}(CO)_{5}. Several analogous indenyl complexes are known.

Monocyclopentadienyl vanadium chlorides include CpVCl_{3} and the diamagnetic CpVOCl_{2}.

=== Arene complexes ===
Vanadium forms a variety of arene complexes, e.g. with benzene:

VCl_{4} + Al + 2 C_{6}H_{6} → [V(η^{6}-C_{6}H_{6})_{2}]AlCl_{4}
[V(η^{6}-C_{6}H_{6})_{2}]AlCl_{4} + H_{2}O → V(η^{6}-C_{6}H_{6})_{2} + ...

Potassium metal reversibly reduces the product to KV(η^{6}-C_{6}H_{6})_{2}.

=== Alkyl and aryl derivatives ===
A handful of alkyl and aryl complexes exist. The reactive species V(mesityl)_{3} forms from VCl_{3}:

VCl_{3}(THF)_{3} + 3 LiC_{6}H_{2}-2,4,6-Me_{3} → V(C_{6}H_{2}-2,4,6-Me_{3})_{3}(THF) + 3 LiCl

This species binds CO and, under appropriate conditions, N_{2}. V(mesityl)_{3} adds a fourth mesityl group and the resulting "ate complex" can be oxidized to the vanadium(IV) derivative:

V(mes)_{3}(THF) + LiMes → Li[V(mes)_{4}]
Li[V(mes)_{4}] + air → V(mes)_{4}(THF)

The tetrakis(norbornyl) complex is also known.

Vanadium oxytrichloride is a starting material for organovanadium(IV) and organovanadium(V) compounds:

VOCl_{3} + Li(mes) → Li[VO(mes)_{3}]
Li[VO(mes)_{3}] + chloranil → VO(mes)_{3}
VOCl_{3} + ZnPh_{2} → VOPhCl_{2} + "ZnPh(Cl)"

== Catalysts and reagents ==
Well-defined vanadium compounds do not appear as catalysts in any commercial process. However organovanadium species are clearly implicated as catalysts for the production of butadiene-based rubbers. These catalysts are generated in situ by treating soluble coordination complexes such as vanadium(III) acetylacetonate with organoaluminium activators.
