= Vanadocene dichloride =

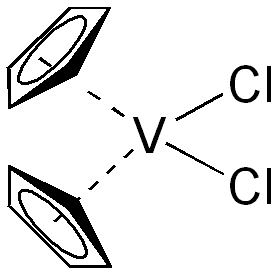

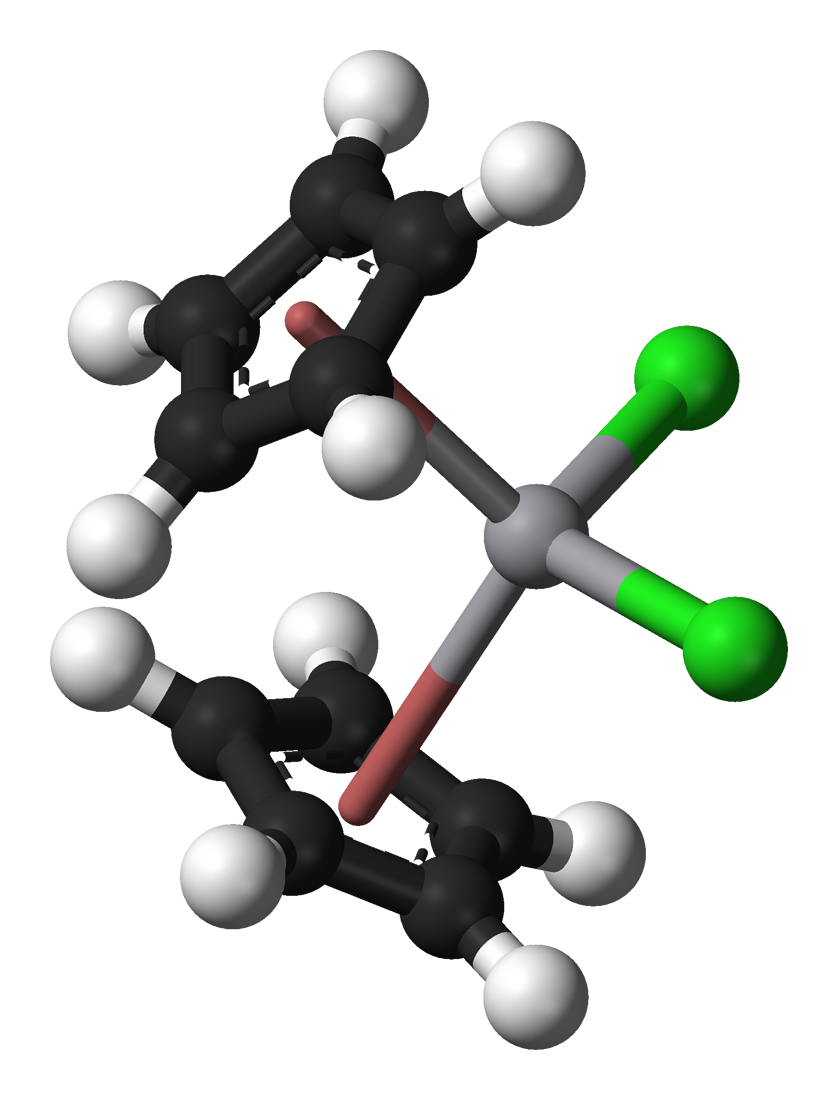

Names
- IUPAC name Dichlorobis(η^{5}-cyclopentadienyl) vanadium
- Other names Dicyclopentadienyl vanadium dichloride

Identifiers
CAS Number	12083-48-6
3D model (JSmol)	Interactive image
Abbreviations	Cp_{2}VCl_{2}
ChemSpider	74816
ECHA InfoCard	100.031.943
EC Number	235-150-8
PubChem CID	82917
RTECS number	YW1580000
UNII	4W2E0IDO21
UN number	3285
CompTox Dashboard (EPA)	DTXSID2024616
- InChI: InChI=1S/2C5H5.2ClH.V/c2*1-2-4-5-3-1;;;/h2*1-5H;2*1H;/q2*-1;;;+2/p-2 Key: UMGIRDUNLQIEBM-UHFFFAOYSA-L
- SMILES: [cH-]1cccc1.[cH-]1cccc1.Cl[V+2]Cl

Properties
Chemical formula	C_{10}H_{10}Cl_{2}V
Molar mass	252.03 g/mol
Appearance	Green solid
Density	1.7 g/ml
Melting point	decomposes
Boiling point	decomposes
Solubility in water	Soluble (Hydrolysis)

Structure
Crystal structure	Monoclinic
Coordination geometry	Tetrahedral

Hazards
- Occupational safety and health (OHS/OSH)
Main hazards	Irritant
- GHS labelling
Pictograms	(GHS06: Toxic) (GHS07: Exclamation mark)
Signal word	Danger
Hazard statements	H301, H315, H319, H335
Precautionary statements	P261, P264, P270, P271, P280, P301+P310, P302+P352, P304+P340, P305+P351+P338, P312, P321, P330, P332+P313, P337+P313, P362, P403+P233, P405, P501
NFPA 704 (fire diamond)	2 0 1

Related compounds
Related compounds	Titanocene dichloride Zirconocene dichloride Hafnocene dichloride Niobocene dichloride Tantalocene dichloride Molybdenocene dichloride Tungstenocene dichloride
- Except where otherwise noted, data are given for materials in their standard state (at 25 °C [77 °F], 100 kPa). verify (what is ?) Infobox references

Vanadocene dichloride is an organometallic complex with formula (η^{5}-C_{5}H_{5})_{2}VCl_{2} (commonly abbreviated as Cp_{2}VCl_{2}). It is a structural analogue of titanocene dichloride but with vanadium(IV) instead of titanium(IV). This compound has one unpaired electron, hence Cp_{2}VCl_{2} is paramagnetic. Vanadocene dichloride is a suitable precursor for variety of bis(cyclopentadienyl)vanadium(IV) compounds.

== Preparation ==
Cp_{2}VCl_{2} was first prepared by Wilkinson and Birmingham via the reaction of NaC_{5}H_{5} and VCl_{4} in THF.

== Reactions and use ==
The compound has been used in organic synthesis.

Reduction of vanadocene dichloride gives vanadocene, (C_{5}H_{5})_{2}V.

Like titanocene dichloride, this organovanadium compound was investigated as a potential anticancer drug. It was conjectured to function by interactions with the protein transferrin.
