= 1,2,3,4,5-Pentakis(4-butylphenyl)-1,3-cyclopentadiene =

Names
- Preferred IUPAC name 1,1′,1′′,1′′′,1′′′ ′-(Cyclopenta-1,3-diene-1,2,3,4,5-pentayl)pentakis(4-butylbenzene)
- Other names Cp^{[BIG]}

Identifiers
CAS Number	161296-28-2
3D model (JSmol)	Interactive image
ChemSpider	103879544
PubChem CID	102025217
UNII	YZ6AHM38KB
CompTox Dashboard (EPA)	DTXSID601129639
- InChI: InChI=1S/C55H66/c1-6-11-16-41-21-31-46(32-22-41)51-52(47-33-23-42(24-34-47)17-12-7-2)54(49-37-27-44(28-38-49)19-14-9-4)55(50-39-29-45(30-40-50)20-15-10-5)53(51)48-35-25-43(26-36-48)18-13-8-3/h21-40,51H,6-20H2,1-5H3 Key: CZMWDGMAEHAEDB-UHFFFAOYSA-N
- SMILES: CCCCC1=CC=C(C=C1)C2C(=C(C(=C2C3=CC=C(C=C3)CCCC)C4=CC=C(C=C4)CCCC)C5=CC=C(C=C5)CCCC)C6=CC=C(C=C6)CCCC

Properties
Chemical formula	C_{55}H_{66}
Molar mass	727.133 g·mol^{−1}
- Except where otherwise noted, data are given for materials in their standard state (at 25 °C [77 °F], 100 kPa). Infobox references

1,2,3,4,5-Pentakis(4-butylphenyl)-1,3-cyclopentadiene is an organochemical compound from the diene group and a cyclopentadiene derivative. The anion of this compound is used as a sterically demanding ligand, often abbreviated as Cp^{[BIG]}, in the organometallic chemistry of sandwich compounds.

== Preparation ==
1,2,3,4,5-Pentakis(4-butylphenyl)-1,3-cyclopentadiene can be prepared in a one-step reaction by the palladium-catalyzed reaction of Zirconocene dichloride with 4-n-butylbenzene bromide.

== Reactions ==
1,2,3,4,5-Pentakis(4-butylphenyl)-1,3-cyclopentadiene reacts directly with a range of organometallic compounds or in reduced form as a sodium or potassium compound with the salts of main-group and transition metals. The resulting metallocenes, in contrast to the unsubstituted Pentaphenylcyclopentadienyl complexes are in various solvents readily soluble. The perarylated metallocenes, such as samarium, sometimes exhibit unusual stability. This is likely to be explained by hydrogen bonds between the substituents. The reaction of 1,2,3,4,5-pentakis(4-butylphenyl)-1,3-cyclopentadiene with strong basic strontium and barium compounds provides the corresponding coplanar sandwich compounds.
