= (Cycloheptatrienyl)(cyclopentadienyl)titanium =

Names
- Other names troticene

Identifiers
CAS Number	51203-49-7
3D model (JSmol)	Interactive image
ChemSpider	10157216
PubChem CID	132274853
- InChI: InChI=1S/C7H7.C5H5.Ti/c1-2-4-6-7-5-3-1;1-2-4-5-3-1;/h1-7H;1-5H;/q2*-1;+2 Key: JDNUFMVXAYMRAZ-UHFFFAOYSA-N
- SMILES: [CH-]1C=CC=C1.[CH-]1C=CC=CC=C1.[Ti+2]

Properties
Chemical formula	C_{12}H_{12}Ti
Molar mass	204.095 g·mol^{−1}
Appearance	blue solid
Density	1.40 g/cm^{3}
- Except where otherwise noted, data are given for materials in their standard state (at 25 °C [77 °F], 100 kPa). Infobox references

(Cycloheptatrienyl)(cyclopentadienyl)titanium is an organotitanium compound with the formula Ti(C_{7}H_{7})(C_{5}H_{5}). It is a blue, diamagnetic, sublimable solid that is sensitive toward air. The structure has been confirmed by X-ray crystallography. This sandwich complex features cyclopentadienyl and cycloheptatrienyl ligands bound to titanium. The Ti–C distances are all within a narrow range near 2.35 Å.

The complex can be prepared by the reaction of titanocene dichloride, butyllithium, and cycloheptatriene.

== See also ==
- (Cycloheptatrienyl)(cyclopentadienyl)vanadium
