= Hexachlorocyclohexa-2,5-dien-1-one =

Structural formula of hexachlorocyclohexa-2,5-dien-1-one
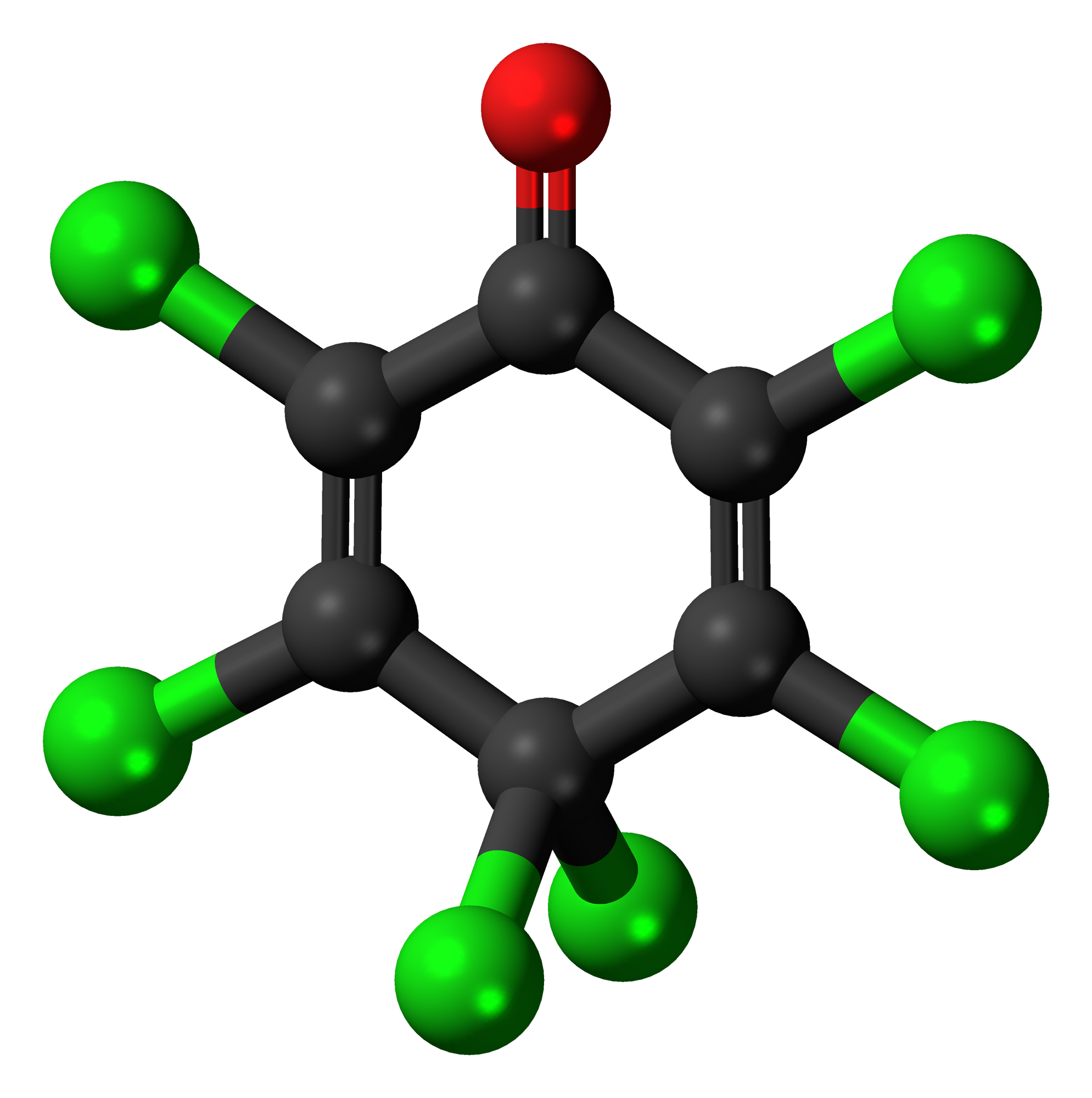

Names
- Preferred IUPAC name 2,3,4,4,5,6-Hexachlorocyclohexa-2,5-dien-1-one
- Other names Hexachlorophenol

Identifiers
CAS Number	599-52-0
3D model (JSmol)	Interactive image; Interactive image
Abbreviations	HCP
ChemSpider	62251
PubChem CID	69029
RTECS number	SN1575000
UNII	7FR4DMR2QZ
CompTox Dashboard (EPA)	DTXSID10208611
- InChI: InChI=1S/C6Cl6O/c7-1-3(13)2(8)5(10)6(11,12)4(1)9 Key: SLKWROUNLHVIIQ-UHFFFAOYSA-N
- SMILES: ClC1=C(Cl)C(Cl)(Cl)C(Cl)=C(Cl)C1=O; O=C1C(=C(Cl)C(Cl)(Cl)C(=C1Cl)Cl)Cl

Properties
Chemical formula	C_{6}Cl_{6}O
Molar mass	300.77 g·mol^{−1}
Melting point	113 °C (235 °F; 386 K)

Structure
Crystal structure	Tetragonal
Space group	I4_{1}/a
Point group	4/m
Lattice constant	a = 21.796 Å, c = 8.568 Å
Lattice volume (V)	4070.36 Å^{3}
Formula units (Z)	16

Hazards
- GHS labelling
Pictograms	(GHS07: Exclamation mark)
Signal word	Warning
Hazard statements	H315, H319, H335
Precautionary statements	P261, P280, P302+P352, P305+P351+P338
- Except where otherwise noted, data are given for materials in their standard state (at 25 °C [77 °F], 100 kPa). Infobox references

Hexachlorocyclohexa-2,5-dien-1-one, sometimes informally called hexachlorophenol (HCP), is an organochlorine compound. It can be prepared from phenol. Despite the informal name, the compound is not a phenol but is a ketone. The informal name may be derived from its method of preparation, which includes phenol as a reagent. It is a white solid with herbicidal properties.

== Preparation and reactions ==
HCP is normally produced by chlorination of phenol by chlorine in aqueous acetic acid.

It can also be produced by alkaline hydrolysis of polychlorinated benzenes at high temperature and pressure, by conversion of diazonium salts of chlorinated anilines, or by chlorination of phenolsulfonic acids and benzenesulfonic acids followed by removal of the sulfonic acid group.

The hydrolysis of HCP gives chloranil.

== See also ==
- Pentachlorophenol
- Hexachlorobenzene
