= Chloranilic acid =

- Skeletal formula of chloranilic acid

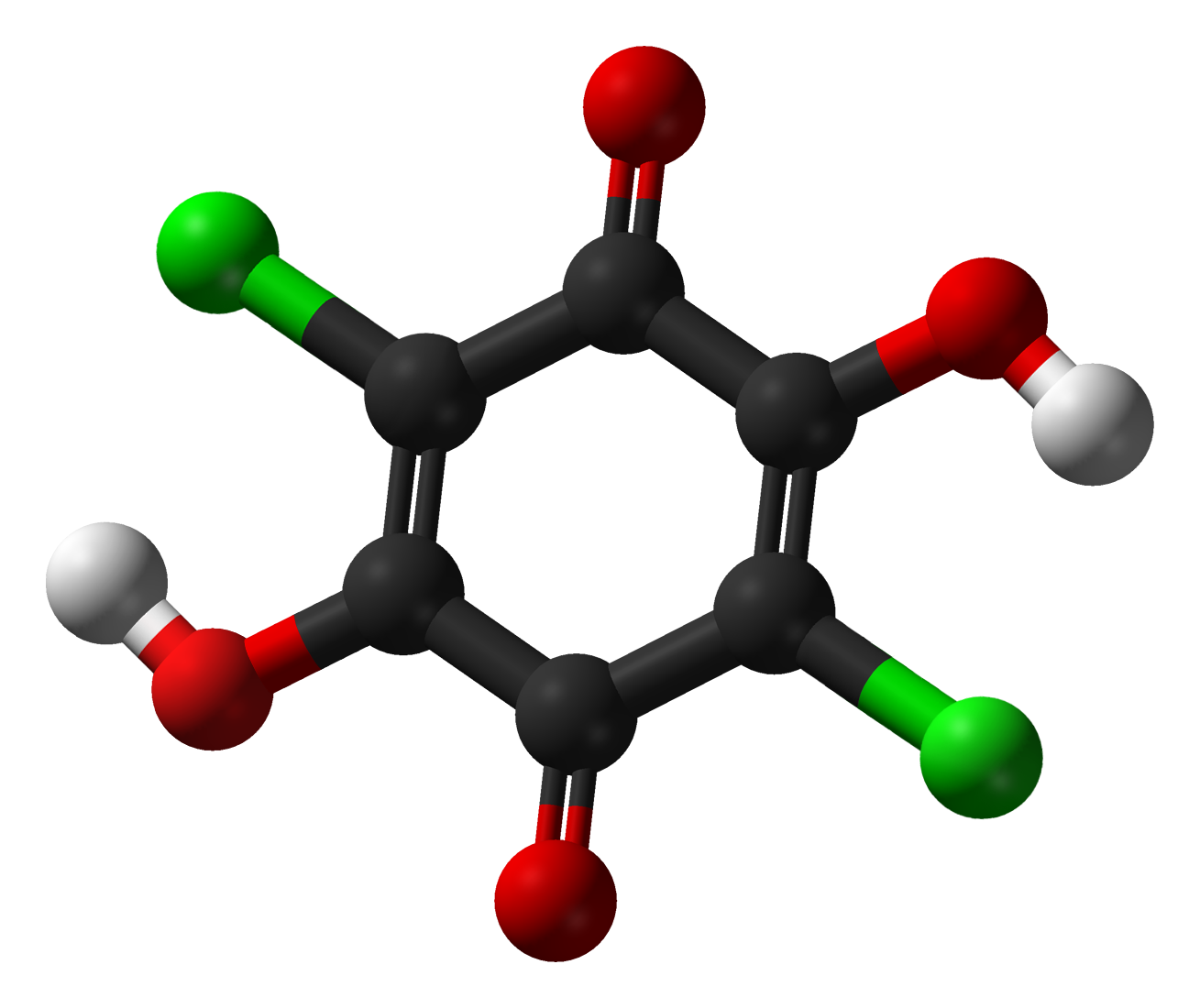
- Ball-and-stick model of chloranilic acid

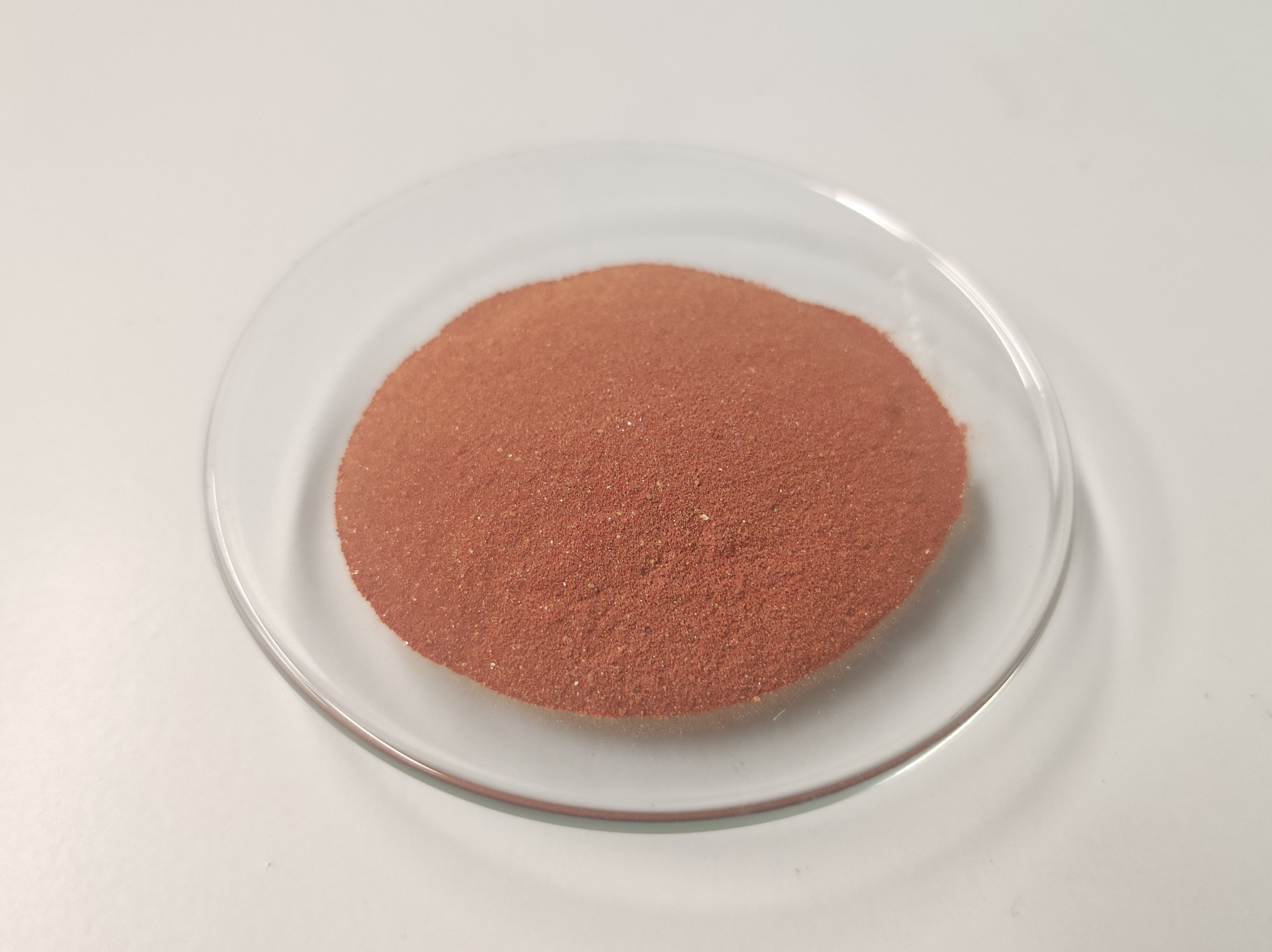

Names
- Preferred IUPAC name 2,5-Dichloro-3,6-dihydroxycyclohexa-2,5-diene-1,4-dione
- Other names 2,5-Dichloro-3,6-dihydroxy-1,4-benzoquinone; 2,5-Dichloro-3,6-dihydroxybenzoquinone

Identifiers
CAS Number	87-88-7
3D model (JSmol)	Interactive image
ChemSpider	59971
ECHA InfoCard	100.001.619
EC Number	201-780-7
PubChem CID	66604
UNII	YJ8L3BB7Y4
CompTox Dashboard (EPA)	DTXSID3058959
- InChI: InChI=1/C6H2Cl2O4/c7-1-3(9)5(11)2(8)6(12)4(1)10/h9,12H Key: IPPWILKGXFOXHO-UHFFFAOYAU
- SMILES: Cl\C1=C(/O)C(=O)C(\Cl)=C(\O)C1=O

Properties
Chemical formula	C_{6}H_{2}Cl_{2}O_{4}
Molar mass	208.98 g/mol
Appearance	orange or red crystals or powder
Density	1.96 g/cm^{3}
Melting point	≥300 °C
Acidity (pK_{a})	2.95, 4.97

Hazards
- GHS labelling
Pictograms	(GHS07: Exclamation mark)
Signal word	Warning
Hazard statements	H315, H319, H335
Precautionary statements	P261, P264, P271, P280, P302+P352, P304+P340, P305+P351+P338, P312, P321, P332+P313, P337+P313, P362, P403+P233, P405, P501
Flash point	135.4 °C (275.7 °F; 408.5 K)
- Except where otherwise noted, data are given for materials in their standard state (at 25 °C [77 °F], 100 kPa). Infobox references

Chloranilic acid is an organic compound with the chemical formula C_{6}Cl_{2}O_{2}(OH)_{2}. It is a red-orange solid. The compound is obtained by hydrolysis of chloranil:

C_{6}Cl_{4}O_{2} + 2 H_{2}O → C_{6}Cl_{2}O_{2}(OH)_{2} + 2 HCl

It is centrosymmetric, planar molecule. It also crystallizes as a dihydrate.

Chloranilic acid is a noteworthy hydroxyquinone that is somewhat acidic owing to the presence of the two chloride substituents. The conjugate base, C_{6}H_{2}Cl_{2}O_{4}^{2-} readily forms coordination complexes often linking pairs of many metal ions.

== See also ==
- Chloranil
