= Trimesitylvanadium =

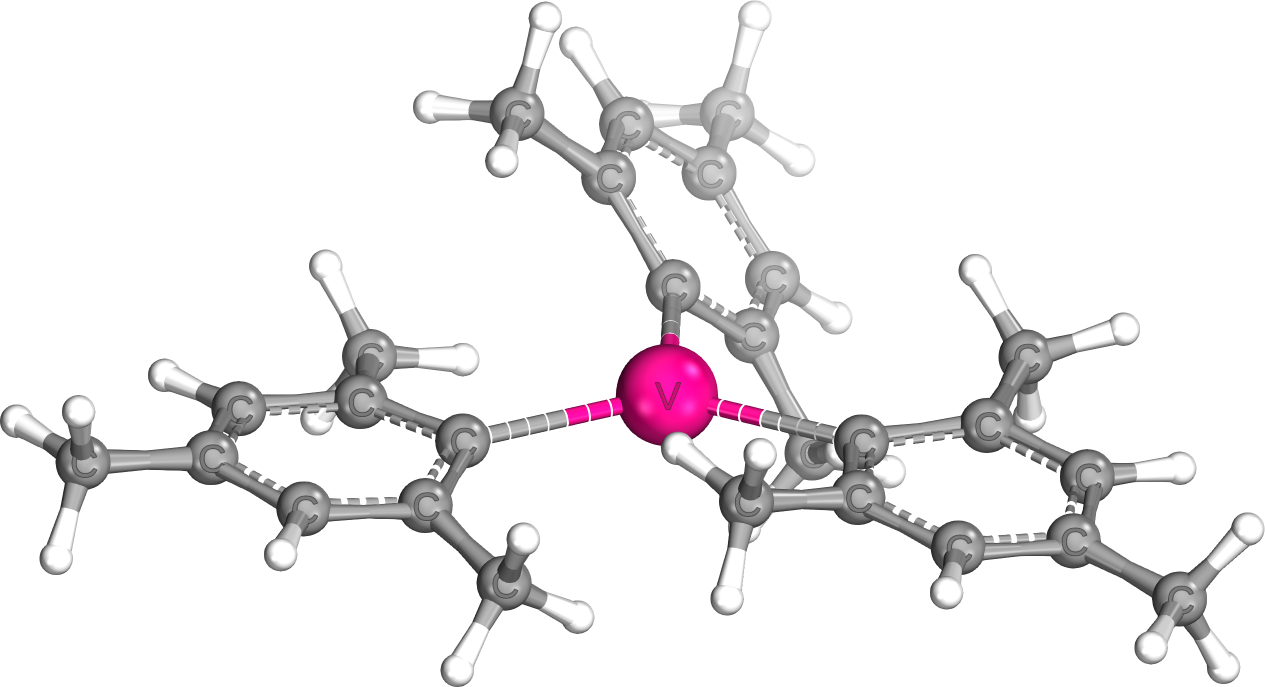

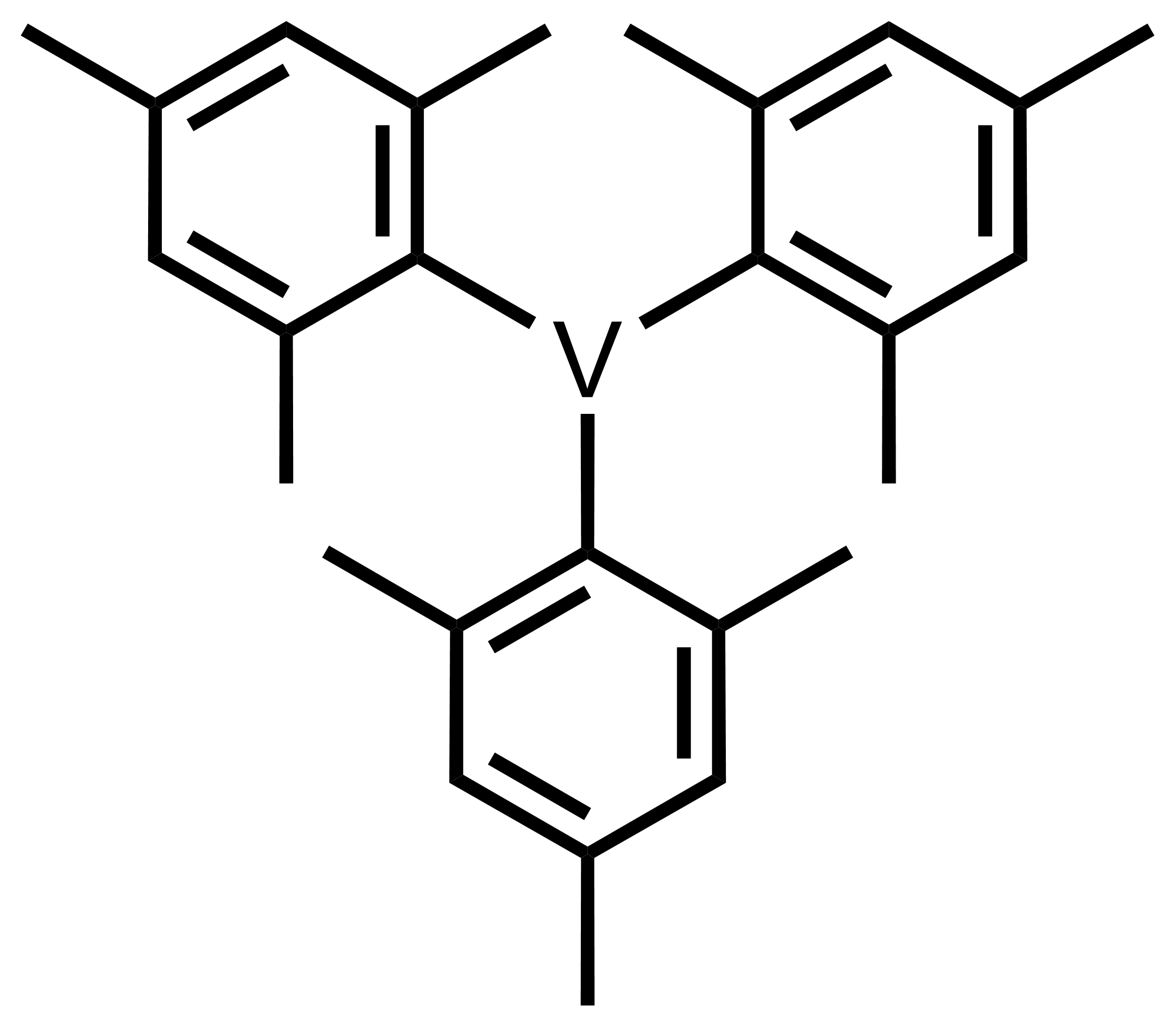

Names
- IUPAC name 1,3,5-trimethylbenzene-6-ide;vanadium
- Other names: Tris(2,4,6-trimethylphenyl)vanadium

Identifiers
3D model (JSmol)	Interactive image
ChemSpider	73949723
PubChem CID	13202584
- InChI: InChI=1S/3C9H11.V/c3*1-7-4-8(2)6-9(3)5-7;/h3*4-5H,1-3H3; Key: WZDKKKNMPLHVJQ
- SMILES: CC1=CC(C)=C(C(C)=C1)[V](C1C(C)=CC(C)=CC=1C)C1C(C)=CC(C)=CC=1C

Properties
Chemical formula	C_{27}H_{33}V
Molar mass	408.503 g·mol^{−1}
Appearance	blue solid
- Except where otherwise noted, data are given for materials in their standard state (at 25 °C [77 °F], 100 kPa). Infobox references

Trimesitylvanadium (mesityl or Mes = 2,4,6-trimethylphenyl) is one of the organovanadium complexes with vanadium in an oxidation state of 3, first synthesized by W. Seidel and G. Kreisel in 1974.

== Synthesis and structure ==
To prepare this compound, VCl_{3}(THF)_{3} (THF = tetrahydrofuran) was reacted with Grignard reagent MesMgBr to form a blue solution at room temperature. It is precipitated by the addition of dioxane, which results in a blue solid. It is thermally stable, but it is also an air-sensitive compound.

A crystal structure revealed VMes_{3}(THF) with trigonal pyramidal or pseudo-tetrahedral geometry.

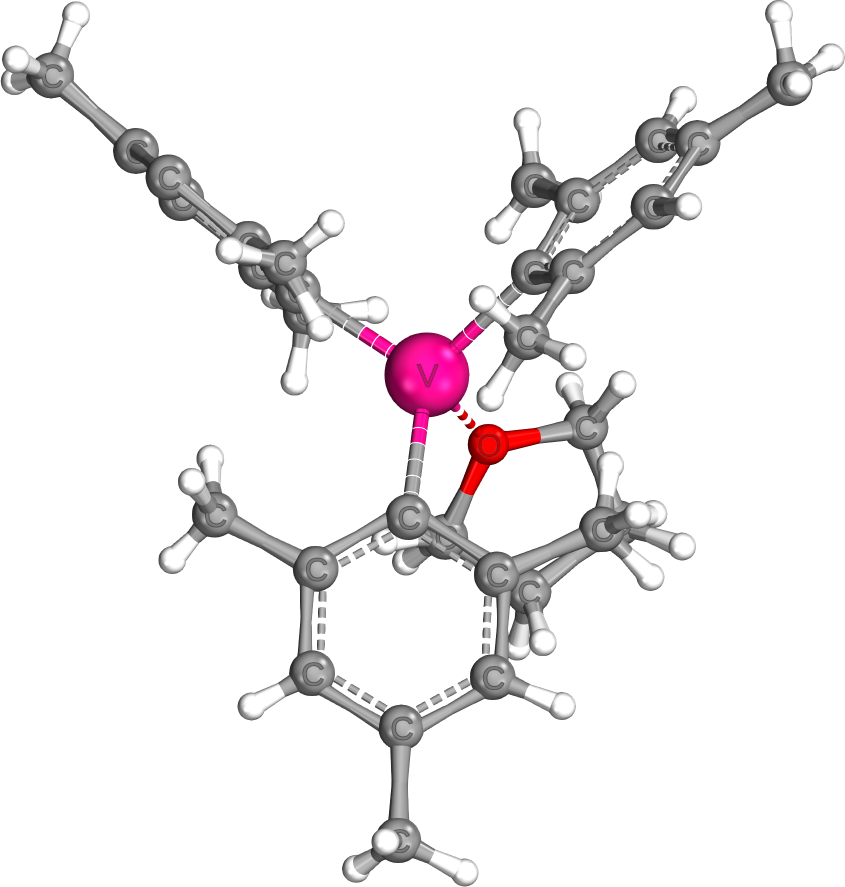
Crystal structure of V(Mes)_{3}THF

=== Solvates ===
Synthesis of trimesitylvanadium usually gives an adduct of the complex with one molecule of solvent. The fact that trimesitylvanadium is recrystallized with THF adduct is due to the strong interaction between vanadium and oxygen. The bond length of the V-O bond is 2.069 Å. According to Pyykkö's atomic radii periodic trend, 1.97 Å would be expected for a single bond between vanadium and oxygen. This suggests that this V-O bond is not fully of single bond, but it is still close enough that it is considered a strong interaction, resulting in the formation of an adduct in recrystallization.

However, THF can be easily dissociated. Experiments found that THF in trimesitylvanadium was exchanged with either pyridine or 2,2'-bipyridine when the product was exposed to either chemical. Lithium mesitylide adjoins to trimesitylvanadium to give a tetramesitylate complex that air oxidizes to the neutral V(IV) salt.

== Applications in organic synthesis ==
=== Insertion reaction by using reactive V-C bond ===
The V-C σ bond in trimesitylvanadium is so reactive that it undergoes insertion reaction of several molecules. Rozzoli et al. investigated the reactivity of V(Mes)_{3}THF with CO, CO_{2}, and ^{t}BuCN. When V(Mes)_{3}THF is reacted with CO, it undergoes reductive elimination and forms MesC(=O)Mes as a product. Excess of CO will also result in the formation of V(CO)_{6} as a side product. For CO_{2} and pivalonitrile (or ^{t}BuCN) as a reagent, they are inserted between the V-C bond. Since V(Mes)_{3}THF is air- and water-sensitive, when the product from the insertion of ^{t}BuCN is exposed to water and/or O_{2}, it undergoes reductive elimination to form imine and amine. These reactions reveal examples of small molecule activation reactions.

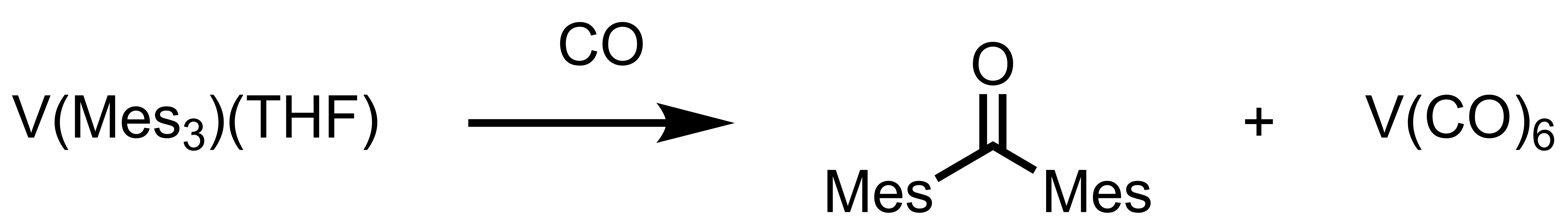
Using CO results reductive elimination of mesityl group, and this is an example of activation reaction of CO.

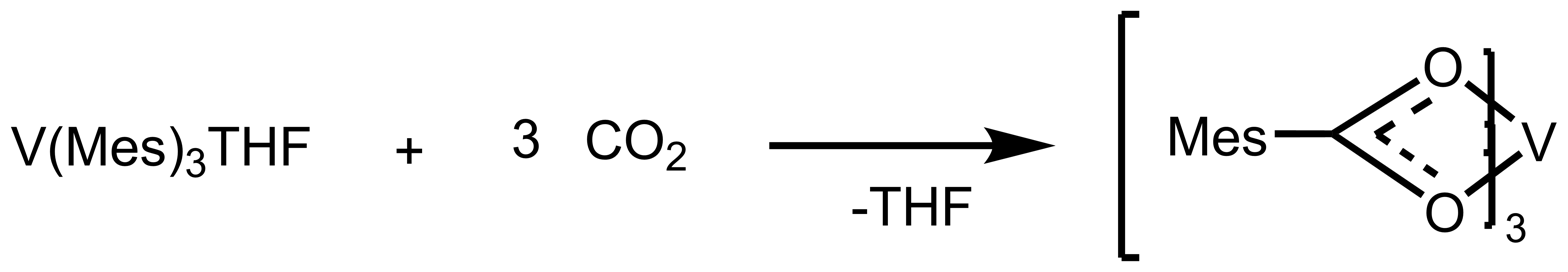
Insertion reaction of CO_{2} makes two oxygen atoms binds vanadium in bidentate fashion while carbon atom is functionalized by mesityl group.

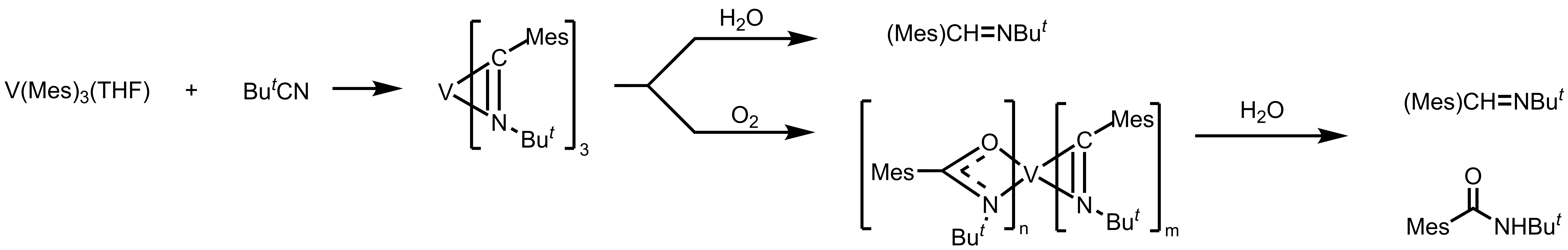
This reaction scheme represents insertion reaction of pivalonitrile with trimesitylvanadium, followed by isolation of imine and amine with exposure of H_{2}O and/or O_{2}.

=== Deoxygenation with vanadium ===
Vanadium (III) is known to be oxophilic transition metal. In vanadium(III) species, V(Mes)_{3}(THF) undergoes deoxygenation of styrene oxide. The styrene oxide turns into styrene while vanadium(III) species becomes vanadyl(V) species (O=V(Mes)_{3}). This product with V(Mes)_{3}(THF) can form μ-oxo complex in toluene as a solution. This unique compound has a magnetic moment of 1.65 μ_{B} per vanadium at 288 K and a V-O-V stretch vibration of 680 cm^{−1}. However, this μ-oxo complex is decomposed under polar coordinating solvent such as pyridine (= py), in which it forms tetramesitylvanadium [V(Mes)_{4}] and pyridine-coordinated complex [(Mes)_{2}V(py)_{2}] with C_{2} symmetry. For [(Mes)_{2}V(py)_{2}], the bond length of the V-C bond is much longer than trimesitylvanadium and trimesitylvanadyl complexes. The μ-oxo complex, tetramesitylvanadium, and pyridine-coordinated complex are examples of vanadium(IV) complexes.

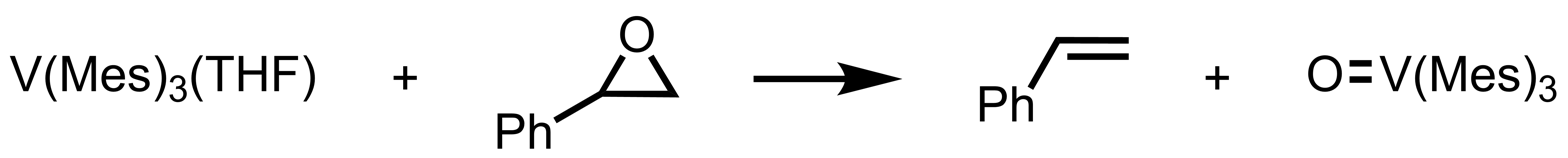
Deoxygenation of styrene oxide with trimesitylvanadium results in styrene and vanadyl(V) complex.

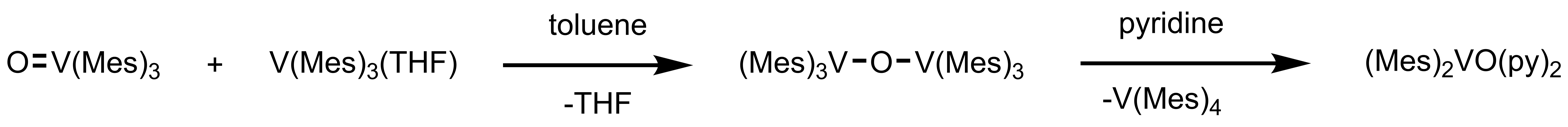
Formation of bridging complex with presence of both vanadyl(V) complex and trimesitylvanadium, followed by decomposition after introducing pyridine.

Deoxygenation by trimesitylvanadium can also be done for coordinated nitric oxide. In (ON)Cr(N-i-Pr_{2})_{3} (i-Pr = isopropyl), introducing V(Mes)_{3}THF in toluene leads to cleavage of N=O bond to form CrΞO complex and μ-oxo vanadium complex. This reaction reduces and cleaves the NO bond by using five electrons.

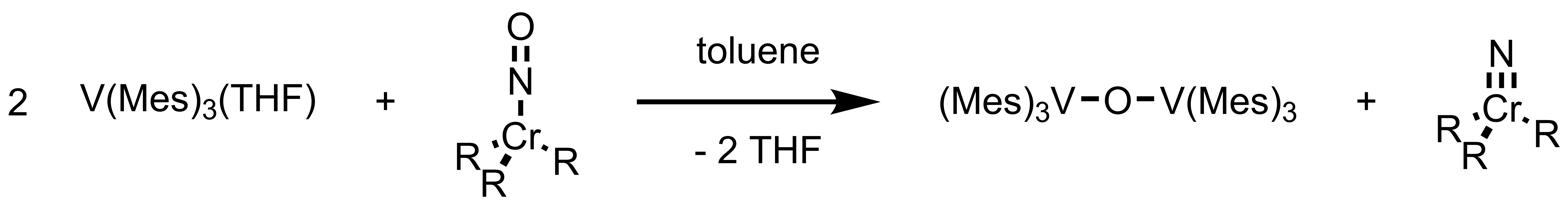
Reductive cleavage of NO bond by trimesityvanadium. R = i-Pr.

== Other applications ==
Trimesitylvanadium is a precursor for organometallic fragments in hexagonally packed mesoporous silica (HMS) as a hydrogen storage source. This vanadium-loaded HMS can absorb 2.68 H_{2} per vanadium center before the hydrogenation effect and 2.74 H_{2} per vanadium center after hydrogenation.

=== Binding dinitrogen by trimesitylvanadium ===
This study was motivated after finding vanadium-containing nitrogenase, which needed a better understanding of the activation of dinitrogen. Floriani et al. attempted the reduction of dinitrogen by using V(Mes)_{3}(THF). After reducing with Na metal in diglyme, Na[V(Mes)_{3}] is reacted with N_{2} to form N_{2}-bound species V(Mes)_{3}N_{2}Na. This product with Na[V(Mes)_{3}] eventually formed N_{2}-bridge product [Na(diglyme)_{2}][Na(p-Mes)_{2}(p-N_{2})V_{2}(Mes)_{2}]. Na ion is located in between aromatic π-conjugation in the mesityl group. Crystallographic analysis revealed that N-N in the product is longer (1.280(21) Å) than free N_{2} (1.0968 Å). Moreover, this product has a magnetic moment of 1.69 μ_{B} per vanadium atom at 293 K. This is due to the reduction of vanadium upon bonding with dinitrogen in a bridging fashion. This reaction was also observed with K metal, resulting in the product with a magnetic moment of 1.83 μ_{B} per vanadium atom at 293 K.

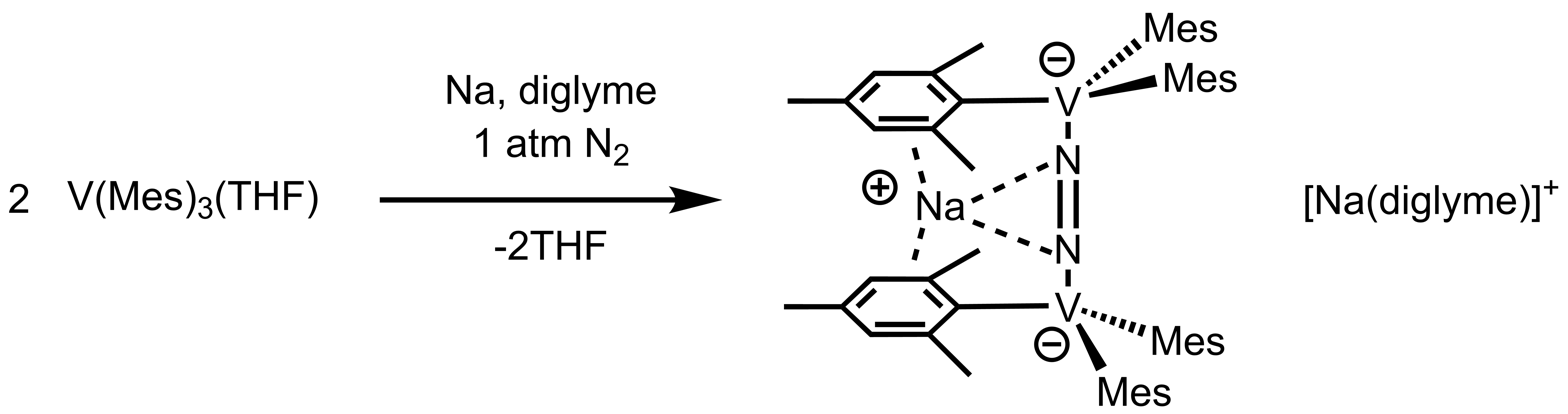
N_{2} binding reaction with trimesitylvanadium. N_{2} binding reaction can be also done with K metal as reductant.
