= Organozirconium and organohafnium chemistry =

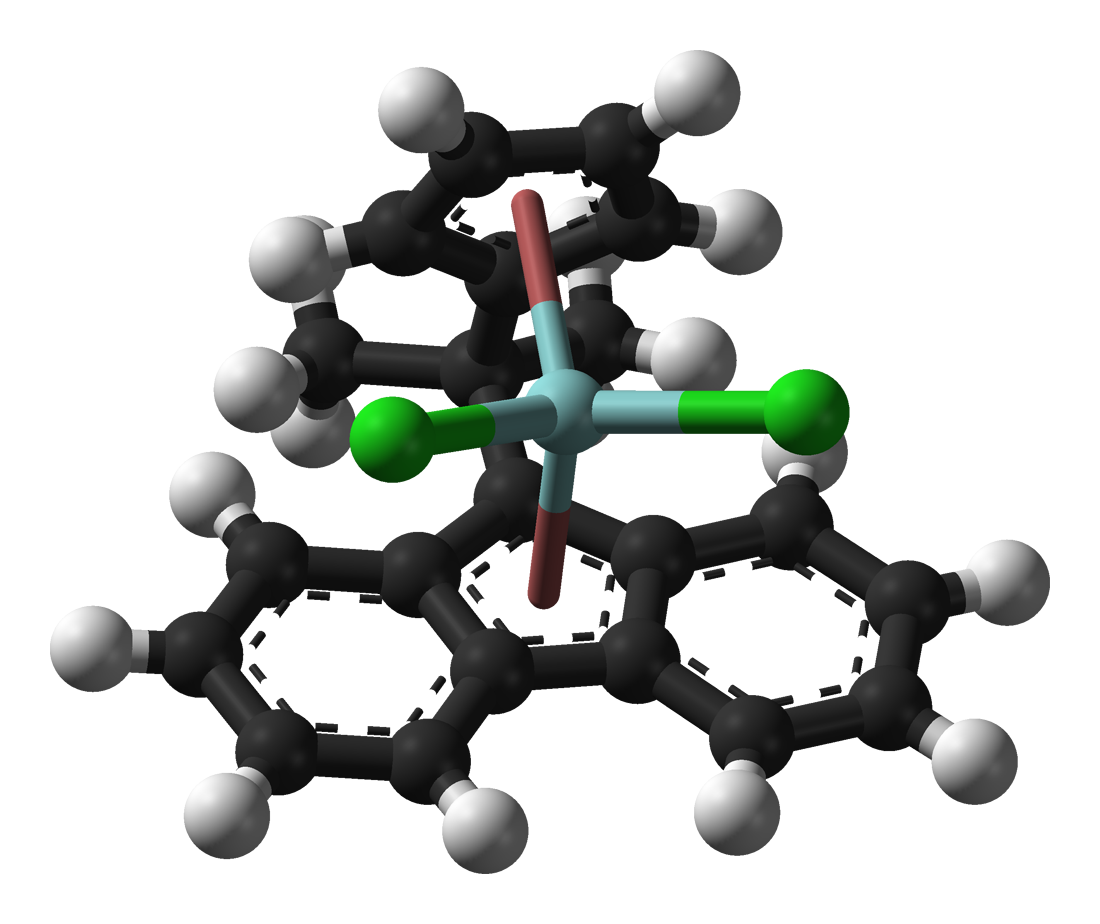
A zirconocene Ewen-style catalyst for producing syndiotactic polypropylene.

Organozirconium chemistry is the science of exploring the properties, structure, and reactivity of organozirconium compounds, which are organometallic compounds containing chemical bonds between carbon and zirconium. Organozirconium compounds have been widely studied, in part because they are useful catalysts in Ziegler-Natta polymerization.

== Comparison with organotitanium chemistry ==
Many organozirconium compounds have analogues on organotitanium chemistry. Zirconium(IV) is more resistant to reduction than titanium(IV) compounds, which often convert to Ti(III) derivatives. By the same token, Zr(II) is a particularly powerful reducing agent, forming robust dinitrogen complexes. Being a larger atom, zirconium forms complexes with higher coordination numbers, e.g. polymeric [CpZrCl_{3}]_{n} vs monomeric CpTiCl_{3} (Cp = C_{5}H_{5}).

== History ==
Zirconocene dibromide was prepared in 1953 by a reaction of the cyclopentadienyl magnesium bromide and zirconium(IV) chloride. In 1966, the dihydride Cp_{2}ZrH_{2} was obtained by the reaction of Cp_{2}Zr(BH_{4})_{2} with triethylamine. In 1970, the related hydrochloride (now called Schwartz's reagent) was obtained by reduction of zirconacene dichloride (Cp_{2}ZrCl_{2}) with lithium aluminium hydride (or the related LiAlH(t-BuO)_{3}). The development of organozirconium reagents was recognized by a Nobel Prize in Chemistry to Ei-Ichi Negishi.

== Zirconocene chemistry ==
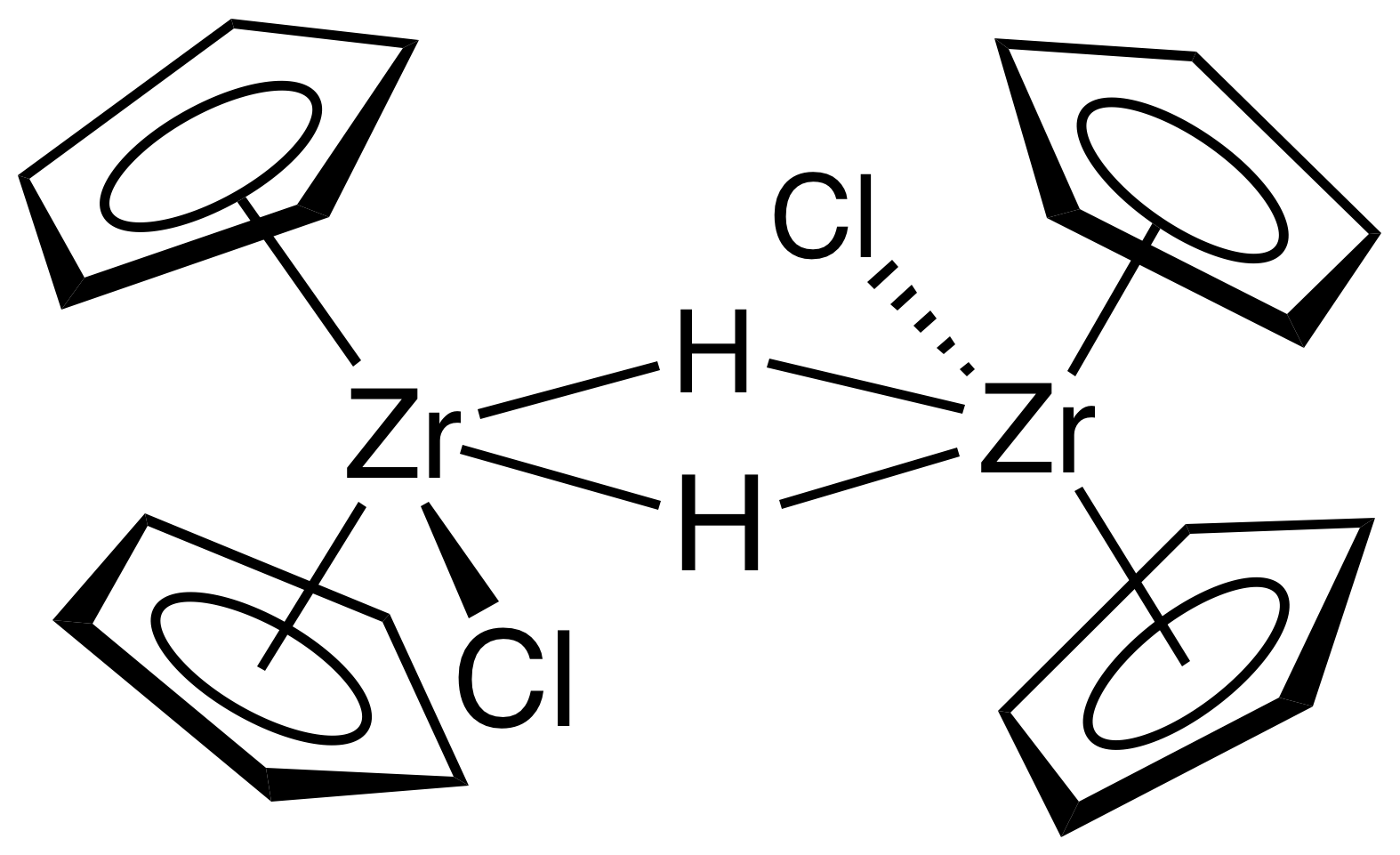
The structure of Schwartz's reagent.

The foremost applications of zirconocenes involve their use as catalysts for olefin polymerization.

Schwartz's reagent ([Cp_{2}ZrHCl]_{2}) participates in hydrozirconation, which enjoys some use in organic synthesis. Substrates for hydrozirconation are alkenes and alkynes. Terminal alkynes give vinyl complexes. Secondary reactions are nucleophilic additions, transmetalations, conjugate additions, coupling reactions, carbonylation, and halogenation.

Extensive chemistry has also been demonstrated from decamethylzirconocene dichloride, Cp*_{2}ZrCl_{2}. Well-studied derivatives include Cp*_{2}ZrH_{2}, [Cp*_{2}Zr]_{2}(N_{2})_{3}, Cp*_{2}Zr(CO)_{2}, and Cp*_{2}Zr(CH_{3})_{2}.

Zirconocene dichloride can be used to cyclise enynes and dienes to give cyclic or bicyclic aliphatic systems.

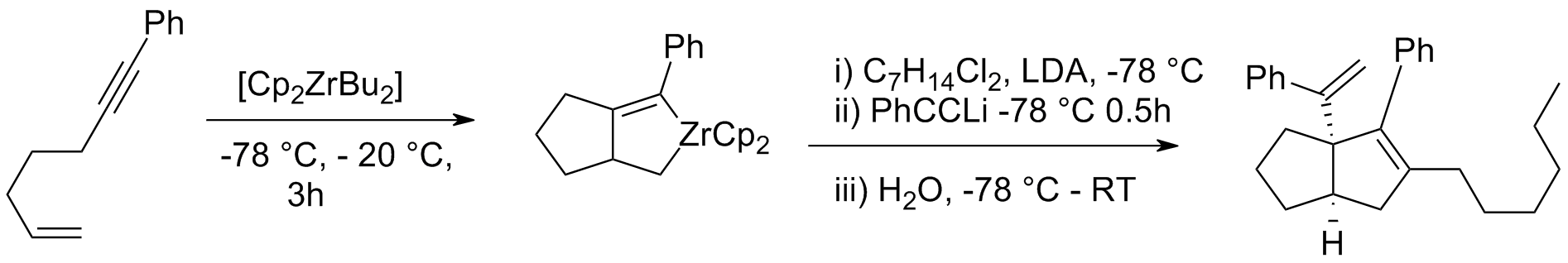

== Alkyl and CO complexes ==
The simplest organozirconium compounds are the homoleptic alkyls. Salts of [Zr(CH_{3})_{6}]^{2-} are known. Tetrabenzylzirconium is a precursor to many catalysts for olefin polymerization. It can be converted to mixed alkyl, alkoxy, and halide derivatives, Zr(CH_{2}C_{6}H_{5})_{3}X (X = CH_{3}, OC_{2}H_{5}, Cl).

Structure of tetrabenzylzirconium with H atoms omitted for clarity.

In addition to mixed Cp_{2}Zr(CO)_{2}, zirconium forms the binary carbonyl [Zr(CO)_{6}]^{2-}.

== Organohafnium chemistry ==
Organohafnium compounds behave nearly identically to organozirconium compounds, as hafnium is just below zirconium on the periodic table. Many Hf analogues of Zr compounds are known, including bis(cyclopentadienyl)hafnium(IV) dichloride, bis(cyclopentadienyl)hafnium(IV) dihydride, and dimethylbis(cyclopentadienyl)hafnium(IV).

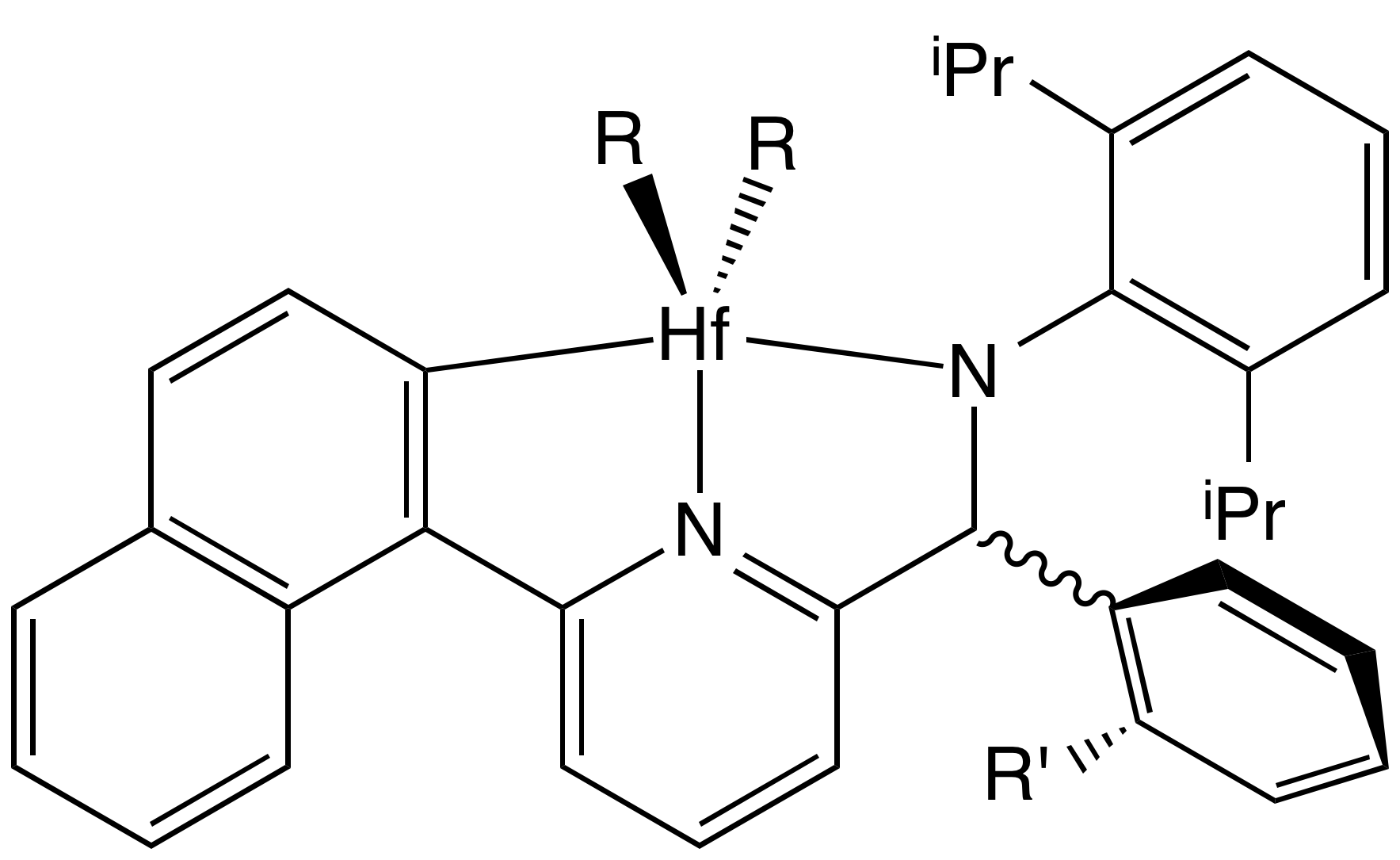
Generic structure of a post-metallocene catalyst based on Dow's pyridyl-amido design.

Cationic hafnocene complexes, post-metallocene catalysts, are used on an industrial scale for the polymerization of alkenes.

== Additional reading ==
- Whitby, R. J.; Dixon, S.; Maloney, P. R.; Delerive, P.; Goodwin, B. J.; Parks, D. J.; Willson, T. M. (2006). "Identification of Small Molecule Agonists of the Orphan Nuclear Receptors Liver Receptor Homolog-1 and Steroidogenic Factor-1". Journal of Medicinal Chemistry. 49 (23): 6652–6655. doi:10.1021/jm060990k. PMID 17154495.
- Kasatkin, A.; Whitby, R. J. (1999). "Insertion of 1-Chloro-1-lithioalkenes into Organozirconocenes. A Versatile Synthesis of Stereodefined Unsaturated Systems". Journal of the American Chemical Society. 121 (30): 7039–7049. doi:10.1021/ja9910208.
