= Decamethylzirconocene dichloride =

Names
- Other names Bis(Pentamethylcyclopentadienyl)zirconium dichloride

Identifiers
CAS Number	54039-38-2
3D model (JSmol)	Interactive image
ChemSpider	17339332
ECHA InfoCard	100.150.124
PubChem CID	5148137
- InChI: InChI=1S/2C10H15.2ClH.Zr/c2*1-6-7(2)9(4)10(5)8(6)3;;;/h2*1-5H3;2*1H;/q2*-1;;;+4/p-2 Key: UJYDWRDELGVHLP-UHFFFAOYSA-L
- SMILES: C[C-]1C(=C(C(=C1C)C)C)C.C[C-]1C(=C(C(=C1C)C)C)C.Cl[Zr+2]Cl

Properties
Chemical formula	C_{20}H_{30}Cl_{2}Zr
Molar mass	432.58 g·mol^{−1}
Appearance	pale yellow solid
Density	1.451 g/cm^{3}
Melting point	> 300 °C (572 °F; 573 K)

Hazards
- GHS labelling
Pictograms	(GHS05: Corrosive) (GHS07: Exclamation mark)
Signal word	Danger
Hazard statements	H302, H312, H314, H332
Precautionary statements	P260, P264, P270, P271, P280, P301+P312, P301+P330+P331, P302+P352, P303+P361+P353, P304+P312, P304+P340, P305+P351+P338, P310, P312, P321, P322, P330, P363, P405, P501
- Except where otherwise noted, data are given for materials in their standard state (at 25 °C [77 °F], 100 kPa). Infobox references

Decamethylzirconocene dichloride is an organozirconium compound with the formula Cp*_{2}ZrCl_{2} (where Cp* is C_{5}(CH_{3})_{5}, derived from pentamethylcyclopentadiene). It is a pale yellow, moisture sensitive solid that is soluble in nonpolar organic solvents. The complex has been the subject of extensive research. It is a precursor to many other complexes, including the dinitrogen complex [Cp*_{2}Zr]_{2}(N_{2})_{3}). It is a precatalyst for the polymerization of ethylene and propylene.
