= Cyclopentadienylvanadium tetracarbonyl =

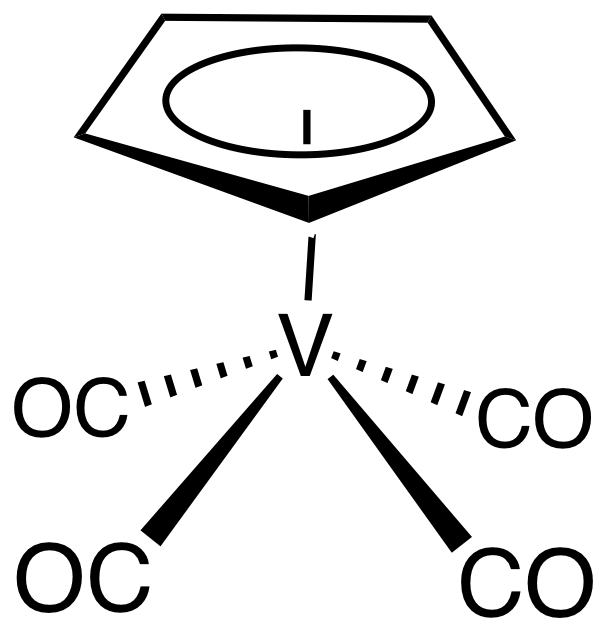

Identifiers
CAS Number	12108-04-2
3D model (JSmol)	Interactive image
EC Number	235-163-9
PubChem CID	498652
CompTox Dashboard (EPA)	DTXSID20153143
- InChI: InChI=1S/C5H5.4CO.V/c1-2-4-5-3-1;4*1-2;/h1-5H;;;;; Key: LIFGJKDEFQAOFY-UHFFFAOYSA-N
- SMILES: C1=C[CH-]C=C1.[O+]#C[V-3](C#[O+])(C#[O+])C#[O+]

Properties
Appearance	orange solid
Density	1.56 g/cm^{3}
Boiling point	sublimes

Hazards
- GHS labelling
Pictograms	(GHS06: Toxic) (GHS07: Exclamation mark)
Signal word	Danger
Hazard statements	H301, H311, H315, H319, H330, H335
Precautionary statements	P260, P264, P270, P271, P280, P284, P301+P310, P302+P352, P304+P340, P305+P351+P338, P310, P312, P320, P321, P330, P332+P313, P337+P313, P361, P362, P363, P403+P233, P405, P501
- Except where otherwise noted, data are given for materials in their standard state (at 25 °C [77 °F], 100 kPa). Infobox references

Cyclopentadienylvanadium tetracarbonyl is the organovanadium compound with the formula (C_{5}H_{5})V(CO)_{4}. An orange, diamagnetic solid, it is the principal cyclopentadienyl carbonyl of vanadium. It can be prepared by heating a solution of vanadocene under high pressure of carbon monoxide. As confirmed by X-ray crystallography, the coordination sphere of vanadium consists of η^{5}-cyclopentadienyl and four carbonyl ligands. The molecule is a four-legged piano stool complex. The compound is soluble in common organic solvents. The compound has no commercial applications.

== Reactions ==
Reduction of cyclopentadienylvanadium tetracarbonylwith sodium amalgam gives the tricarbonyl dianion:

CpV(CO)_{4} + 2 Na → Na_{2}CpV(CO)_{3} + CO

Protonation of this salt gives Cp_{2}V_{2}(CO)_{5}.

Heating a mixture of cycloheptatriene and cyclopentadienylvanadium tetracarbonyl gives (cycloheptatrienyl)(cyclopentadienyl)vanadium ("trovacene").
