= Niobocene dichloride =

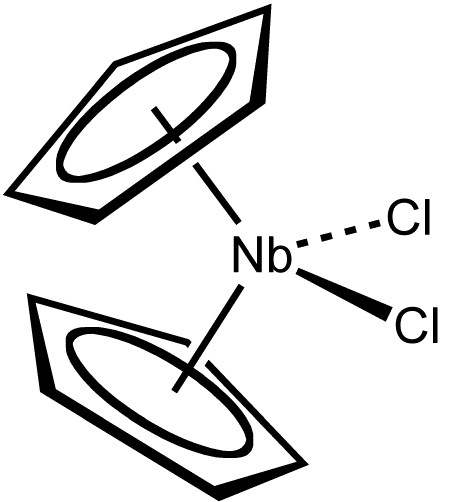

Names
- IUPAC name Dichloridobis (η^{5}-cyclopentadienyl)niobium
- Other names Niobocene dichloride

Identifiers
CAS Number	12793-14-5
3D model (JSmol)	Interactive image
ChemSpider	21251691
ECHA InfoCard	100.159.630
EC Number	631-385-9
PubChem CID	16211739
RTECS number	QU0400000
- InChI: InChI=1S/2C5H5.2ClH.Nb/c2*1-2-4-5-3-1;;;/h2*1-5H;2*1H;/q;;;;+2/p-2 Key: CYMWZQTUXXEBCR-UHFFFAOYSA-L
- SMILES: [cH-]1cccc1.[cH-]1cccc1.Cl[Nb+2]Cl

Properties
Chemical formula	C_{10}H_{10}Cl_{2}Nb
Molar mass	294 g/mol
Appearance	brown solid
Melting point	dec.
Boiling point	dec.
Solubility in water	soluble (hydrolysis)
Solubility in other solvents	sparingly in chlorocarbons

Hazards
- GHS labelling
Pictograms	(GHS07: Exclamation mark)
Signal word	Warning
Hazard statements	H315, H319, H335
Precautionary statements	P261, P264, P271, P280, P302+P352, P304+P340, P305+P351+P338, P312, P321, P332+P313, P337+P313, P362, P403+P233, P405, P501

Related compounds
Related compounds	Cp_{2}TiCl_{2} Cp_{2}MoCl_{2} Cp_{2}VCl_{2}
- Except where otherwise noted, data are given for materials in their standard state (at 25 °C [77 °F], 100 kPa). verify (what is ?) Infobox references

Niobocene dichloride is the organometallic compound with the formula (C_{5}H_{5})_{2}NbCl_{2}, abbreviated Cp_{2}NbCl_{2}. This paramagnetic brown solid is a starting reagent for the synthesis of other organoniobium compounds. The compound adopts a pseudotetrahedral structure with two cyclopentadienyl and two chloride substituents attached to the metal. A variety of similar compounds are known, including Cp_{2}TiCl_{2}.

== Preparation and structure ==
It was originally reported by Geoffrey Wilkinson. It is prepared via a multistep reaction beginning with treatment of niobium pentachloride with cyclopentadienylsodium:

NbCl_{5} + 5 NaC_{5}H_{5} → 5 NaCl + (C_{5}H_{5})_{4}Nb + "C_{5}H_{5}"
2 (C_{5}H_{5})_{4}Nb + 4 HCl + 0.5 O_{2} → [(C_{5}H_{5})_{2}NbCl]_{2}OCl_{2} + 4 C_{5}H_{6}
[(C_{5}H_{5})_{2}NbCl]_{2}OCl_{2} + SnCl_{2} + 2 HCl → 2 (C_{5}H_{5})_{2}NbCl_{2} + SnCl_{4} + H_{2}O

The compound adopts a "clamshell" structure characteristic of a bent metallocene where the Cp rings are not parallel, the average Cp(centroid)-M-Cp angle being about 130.3°. The Cl-Nb-Cl angle of 85.6° is narrower than in zirconocene dichloride (97.1°) but wider than in molybdocene dichloride (82°). This trend is consistent with the orientation of the HOMO in this class of complex.

== Applications and further work ==
Unlike the related zirconacene and titanocene dichlorides, no applications have been found for this compound, although it has been studied widely. It was investigated as a potential anti-cancer agent.
