= Schwartz's reagent =

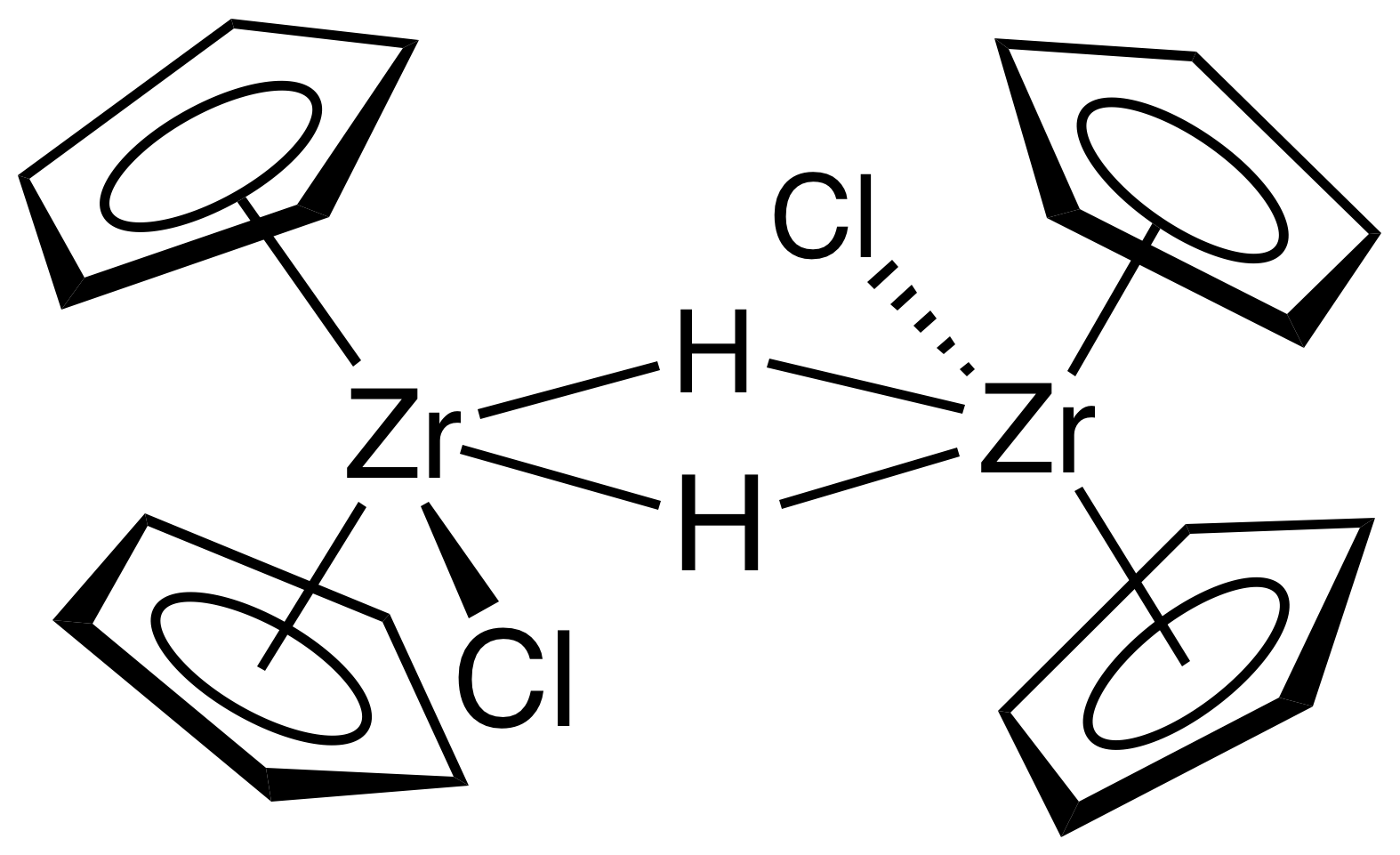

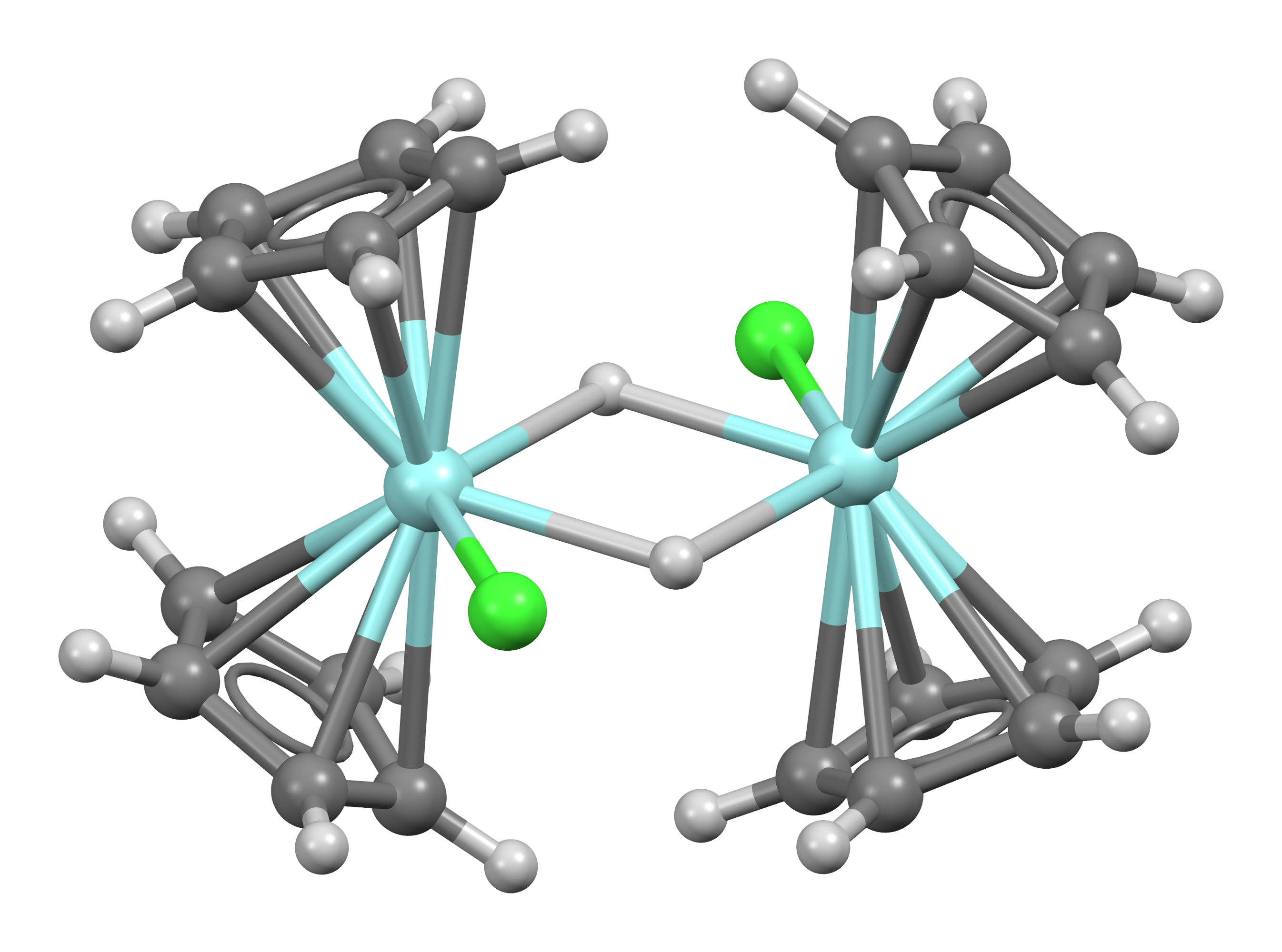

Names
- IUPAC name Chloridohydridozirconocene
- Systematic IUPAC name chloridobis(η^{5}-cyclopentadienyl)hydridozirconium
- Other names Cp_{2}ZrClH, zirconocene chloride hydride

Identifiers
CAS Number	37342-97-5
3D model (JSmol)	Interactive image
ChemSpider	28605366
ECHA InfoCard	100.048.599
EC Number	253-479-5
PubChem CID	53384630
UNII	S84D01XQGL
CompTox Dashboard (EPA)	DTXSID30894914
- InChI: InChI=1S/2C5H5.ClH.Zr.H/c2*1-2-4-5-3-1;;;/h2*1-5H;1H;;/q2*-1;;+3;/p-1 Key: GBJQOFBMEJYDAU-UHFFFAOYSA-M; InChI=1/2C5H5.ClH.Zr.H/c2*1-2-4-5-3-1;;;/h2*1-5H;1H;;/q2*-1;;+3;/p-1/r2C5H5.ClHZr/c2*1-2-4-5-3-1;1-2/h2*1-5H;2H/q2*-1;+2 Key: GBJQOFBMEJYDAU-CFXPZLBWAB
- SMILES: [cH-]1cccc1.[cH-]1cccc1.Cl[ZrH+2]

Properties
Chemical formula	C_{10}H_{11}ClZr
Molar mass	257.87 g/mol
Appearance	White solid

Hazards
- GHS labelling
Pictograms	(GHS02: Flammable) (GHS05: Corrosive)
Signal word	Danger
Hazard statements	H228, H261, H314
Precautionary statements	P210, P231+P232, P240, P241, P260, P264, P280, P301+P330+P331, P303+P361+P353, P304+P340, P305+P351+P338, P310, P321, P363, P370+P378, P402+P404, P405, P501
- Except where otherwise noted, data are given for materials in their standard state (at 25 °C [77 °F], 100 kPa). verify (what is ?) Infobox references

Schwartz's reagent is the common name for the organozirconium compound with the formula (C_{5}H_{5})_{2}ZrHCl, sometimes called zirconocene hydrochloride or zirconocene chloride hydride, and is named after Jeffrey Schwartz, a chemistry professor at Princeton University. This metallocene is used in organic synthesis for various transformations of alkenes and alkynes.

== Preparation ==
The complex was first prepared by Wailes and Weigold. It can be purchased or readily prepared by reduction of zirconocene dichloride with lithium aluminium hydride:

(C_{5}H_{5})_{2}ZrCl_{2} + 1/4 LiAlH_{4} → (C_{5}H_{5})_{2}ZrHCl + 1/4 LiAlCl_{4}

This reaction also affords (C_{5}H_{5})_{2}ZrH_{2}, which is treated with methylene chloride to give Schwartz's reagent

An alternative procedure that generated Schwartz's reagent from dihydride has also been reported. Moreover, it's possible to perform an in situ preparation of (C_{5}H_{5})_{2}ZrHCl from zirconocene dichloride by using LiH. This method can also be used to synthesize isotope-labeled molecules, like olefines by employing Li^{2}H or Li^{3}H as reducing agents.

Schwartz's reagent has a low solubility in common organic solvents. The trifluoromethanesulfonate (C_{5}H_{5})_{2}ZrH(OTf) is soluble in THF.

== Structure ==
The complex adopts the usual "clam-shell" structure seen for other Cp_{2}MX_{n} complexes. The dimetallic structure has been confirmed by Microcrystal electron diffraction. The results are consistent with FT-IR spectroscopy, which established that the hydrides are bridging. Solid state NMR spectroscopy also indicates a dimeric structure. The X-ray crystallographic structure for the methyl compound (C_{5}H_{5})_{4}Zr_{2}H_{2}(CH_{3})_{2} compound is analogous.

== Uses in organic synthesis ==
Schwartz's reagent reduces amides to aldehydes.

Vinylation of ketones in high yields is a possible use of Schwartz's reagent.

Schwartz's reagent has been used in the synthesis of some macrolide antibiotics, (−)-motuporin, and antitumor agents.

== Hydrozirconation ==
Hydrozirconation is a form of hydrometalation. Substrates for hydrozirconation are alkenes and alkynes. With terminal alkynes the terminal vinyl zirconium product is predominantly formed. Secondary reactions are nucleophilic additions, transmetalations, conjugate additions, coupling reactions, carbonylation and halogenation.

Computational studies indicate that hydrozirconation occurs from the interior portion. When treated with one equivalent of Cp_{2}ZrClH, diphenylacetylene gives the corresponding alkenylzirconium as a mixture of cis and trans isomers. With two equivalents of hydride, the endproduct was a mixture of erythro and threo zircono alkanes:

In 1974 Hart and Schwartz reported that the organozirconium intermediates react with electrophiles such as hydrochloric acid, bromine and acid chlorides to give the corresponding alkane, bromoalkanes, and ketones:

The corresponding organoboron and organoaluminum compounds were already known, but these are air-sensitive and/or pyrophoric whereas organozirconium compounds are not.

=== Scope ===
In one study the usual regioselectivity of an alkyne hydrozirconation is reversed with the addition of zinc chloride:

One example of a one-pot hydrozirconation - carbonylation - coupling is depicted below:

With certain allyl alcohols, the alcohol group is replaced by nucleophilic carbon forming a cyclopropane ring:

The selectivity of the hydrozirconation of alkynes has been studied in detail. Generally, the addition of the Zr–H proceeds via the syn-addition. The rate of addition to unsaturated carbon-carbon bonds is terminal alkyne > terminal alkene ≈ internal alkyne > disubstituted alkene Acyl complexes can be generated by insertion of CO into the C–Zr bond resulting from hydrozirconation. Upon alkene insertion into the zirconium hydride bond, the resulting zirconium alkyl undergoes facile rearrangement to the terminal alkyl and therefore only terminal acyl compounds can be synthesized in this way. The rearrangement most likely proceeds via β-hydride elimination followed by reinsertion.
