= Molybdocene dichloride =

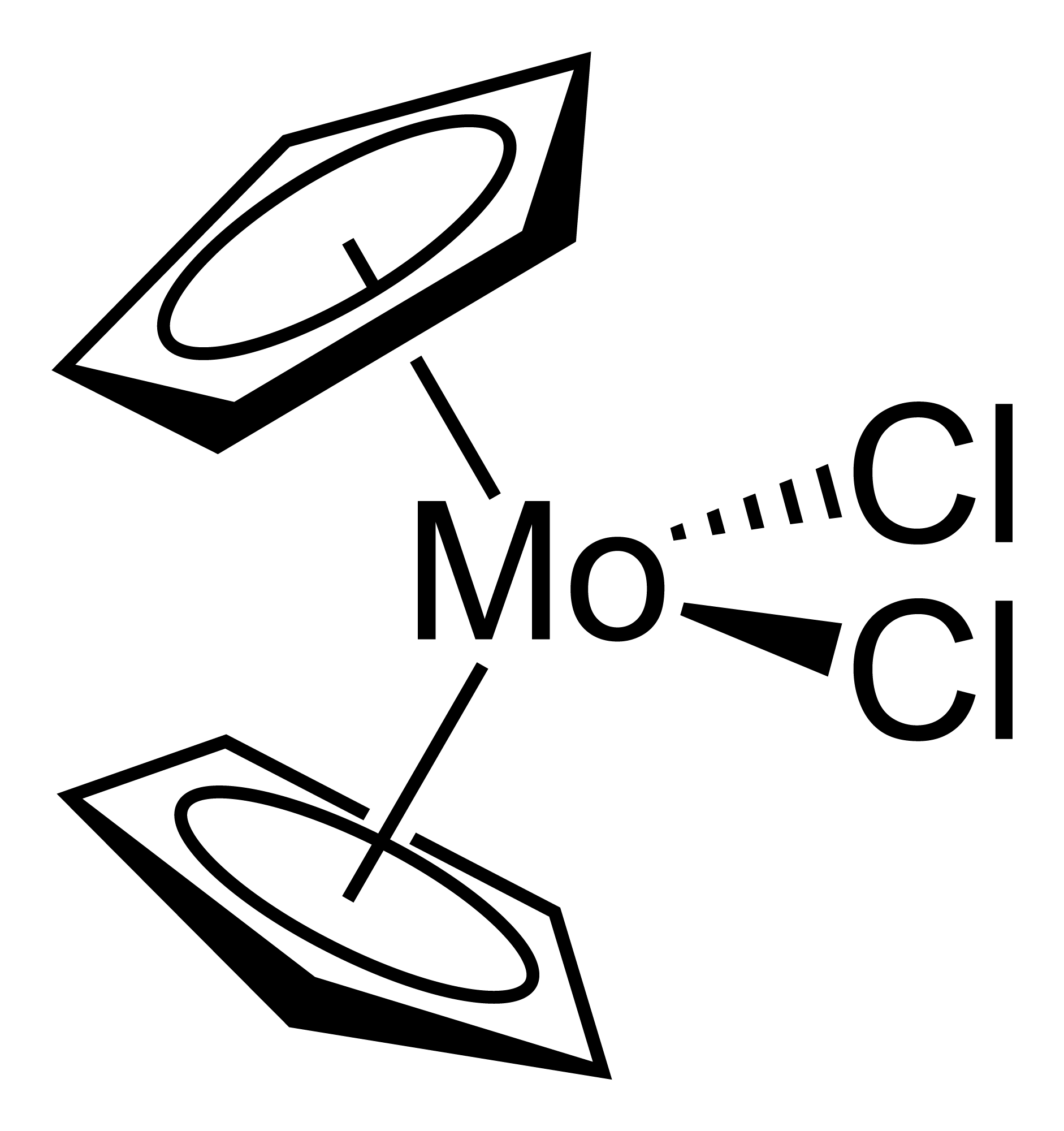

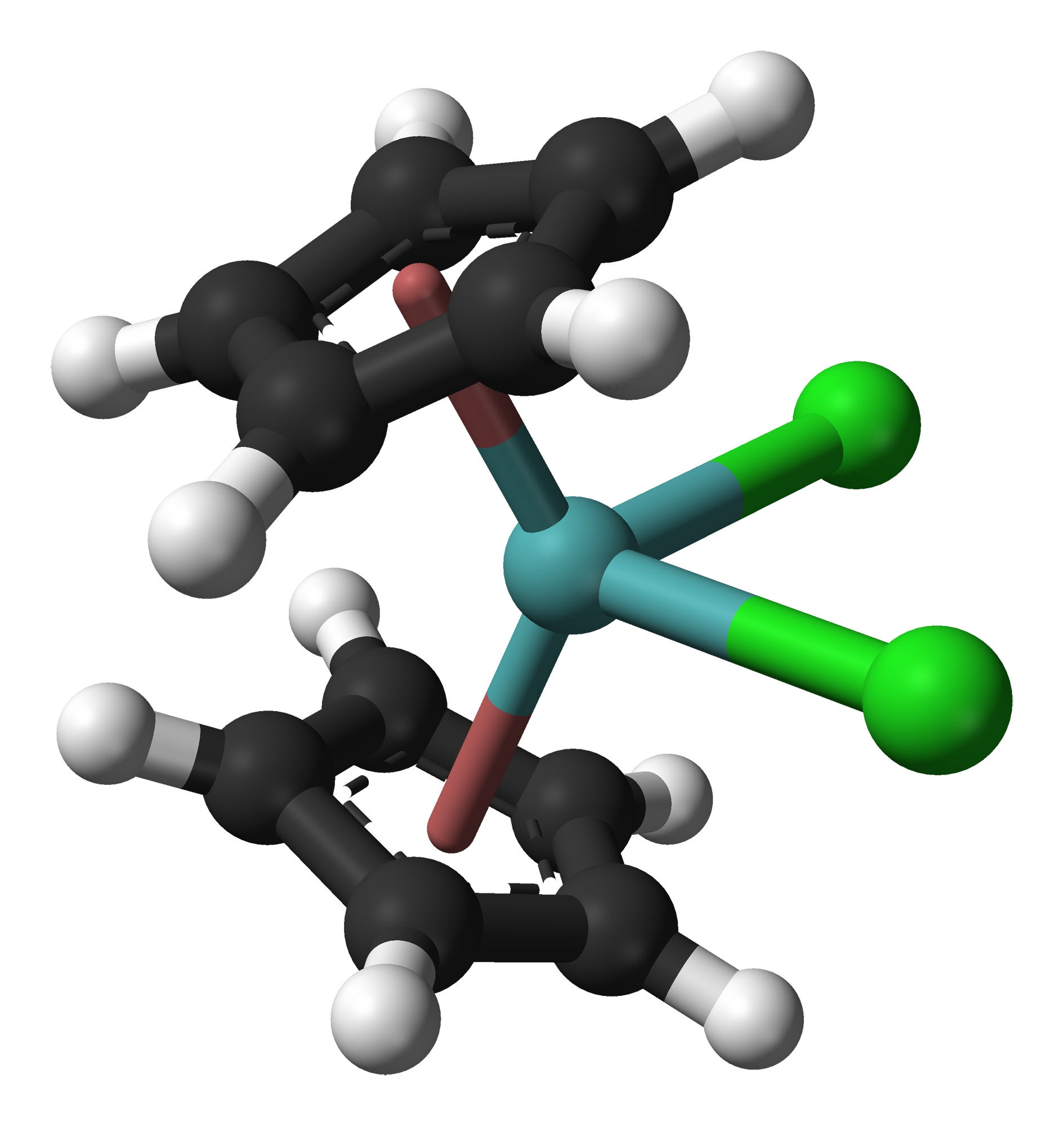

Names
- IUPAC name dichlorobis(η^{5}-cyclopentadienyl)molybdenum(IV)
- Other names molybdocene dichloride, molybdenocene dichloride, dichloridobis(cyclopentadienyl)molybdenum(IV)

Identifiers
CAS Number	12184-22-4
3D model (JSmol)	Interactive image
ChemSpider	398274
ECHA InfoCard	100.159.644
PubChem CID	452153
CompTox Dashboard (EPA)	DTXSID10923978
- InChI: InChI=1S/2C5H5.2ClH.Mo/c2*1-2-4-5-3-1;;;/h2*1-5H;2*1H;/q2*-1;;;+2/p-2 Key: QGGWSCVAFKWITK-UHFFFAOYSA-L; InChI=1/2C5H5.2ClH.Mo/c2*1-2-4-5-3-1;;;/h2*1-5H;2*1H;/q2*-1;;;+2/p-2/r2C5H5.Cl2Mo/c2*1-2-4-5-3-1;1-3-2/h2*1-5H;/q2*-1; Key: QGGWSCVAFKWITK-OWLYHJECAX
- SMILES: [cH-]1cccc1.[cH-]1cccc1.Cl[Mo+2]Cl

Properties
Chemical formula	C_{10}H_{10}Cl_{2}Mo
Molar mass	297.04 g·mol^{−1}
Appearance	greenish-brown powder
Solubility in water	insoluble, moisture sensitive

Hazards
- Safety data sheet (SDS)

Related compounds
Related compounds	Ferrocene; Zirconocene dichloride Vanadocene dichloride Niobocene dichloride Titanocene dichloride Tantalocene dichloride
- Except where otherwise noted, data are given for materials in their standard state (at 25 °C [77 °F], 100 kPa). Infobox references

Molybdocene dichloride is the organomolybdenum compound with the formula (η^{5}-C_{5}H_{5})_{2}MoCl_{2} and IUPAC name dichlorobis(η^{5}-cyclopentadienyl)molybdenum(IV), and is commonly abbreviated as Cp_{2}MoCl_{2}. It is a brownish-green air- and moisture-sensitive powder. In the research laboratory, it is used to prepare many derivatives.

== Preparation and structure ==
The compound is prepared from molybdocene dihydride by treatment with chloroform:

(C_{5}H_{5})_{2}MoH_{2} + 2 CHCl_{3} → (C_{5}H_{5})_{2}MoCl_{2} + 2 CH_{2}Cl_{2}

The compound adopts a "clamshell" structure where the Cp rings are not parallel, the average Cp(centroid)-M-Cp angle being 130.6°. The two chloride ligands are cis, the Cl-Mo-Cl angle of 82° being narrower than in niobocene dichloride (85.6°), which in turn is less than in zirconacene dichloride (92.1°). This trend helped to establish the orientation of the HOMO in this class of complex.

== Uses ==
Unlike the titanocene and zirconacene derivatives, the molybdocene compounds have yielded no commercial applications.

All metallocene dihalides exhibit some anti-cancer activity, but these have not yielded useful compounds in the clinic.
