= Vanadocene =

Names
- IUPAC name Vanadocene
- Systematic IUPAC name Bis(η^{5}-cyclopentadienyl)vanadium

Identifiers
CAS Number	1277-47-0
3D model (JSmol)	Interactive image
ChemSpider	21188623
ECHA InfoCard	100.149.756
EC Number	620-850-1
PubChem CID	18667909
UNII	GZ5K54AP9L
CompTox Dashboard (EPA)	DTXSID10925957
- InChI: InChI=1S/2C5H5.V/c2*1-2-4-5-3-1;/h2*1-5H;/q2*-1;+2 Key: YXQWGVLNDXNSJJ-UHFFFAOYSA-N
- SMILES: c1ccc[cH-]1.c2ccc[cH-]2.[V+2]

Properties
Chemical formula	V(C_{5}H_{5})_{2}
Molar mass	181.128 g/mol
Appearance	Violet crystals
Melting point	167 °C (333 °F; 440 K)

Hazards
- GHS labelling
Pictograms	(GHS02: Flammable) (GHS06: Toxic)
Signal word	Danger
- Except where otherwise noted, data are given for materials in their standard state (at 25 °C [77 °F], 100 kPa). verify (what is ?) Infobox references

Vanadocene, bis(η^{5}-cyclopentadienyl) vanadium, is the organometallic compound with the formula V(C_{5}H_{5})_{2}, commonly abbreviated Cp_{2}V. It is a violet crystalline, paramagnetic solid. Vanadocene has relatively limited practical use, but it has been extensively studied.

== Structure and bonding ==
V(C_{5}H_{5})_{2} is a metallocene, a class of organometallic compounds that typically have a metal ion sandwiched between two cyclopentadienyl rings. In the solid state, the molecule has D_{5d} symmetry. The vanadium(II) center resides equidistant between the center of the two cyclopentadienyl rings at a crystallographic center of inversion. The average V-C bond distance is 226 pm. The Cp rings of vanadocene are dynamically disordered at temperatures above 170 K and are only fully ordered at 108 K.

== Preparation ==
Vanadocene was first prepared in 1954 by Birmingham, Fischer, and Wilkinson via a reduction of vanadocene dichloride with aluminum hydride, after which vanadocene was sublimed in vacuum at 100 ˚C. A modern synthesis of vanadocene that allows production in higher quantities requires treating [V_{2}Cl_{3}(THF)_{6}]_{2}[Zn_{2}Cl_{6}] with cyclopentadienylsodium.

2 [V_{2}Cl_{3}(THF)_{6}]_{2}[Zn_{2}Cl_{6}] + 8 NaCp + THF → 4 Cp_{2}V

== Properties ==
With only 15 valence electrons, vanadocene is highly reactive. For example, it adds alkynes to yield the corresponding vanadium-cyclopropene complexes.

Likewise, high carbon monoxide pressures give CpV(CO)_{4}. That piano-stool complex can rearrange to an ionic, mixed-valence, vanadium hexacarbonyl derivative:

Cp_{2}V + V(CO)_{6} → [Cp_{2}V(CO)_{2}]^{+}[V(CO)_{6}]^{−}

Vanadocene is extremely air-sensitive, and either 12% (by mass) hydrochloric acid or ferrocenium in toluene will easily oxidize an electron from the complex:

VCp_{2} + [FeCp_{2}]BR_{4} → [VCp_{2}]BR_{4} + FeCp_{2} (R = Ph or 4-C_{6}H_{4}F)

The monocations themselves oxidize in air, having a redox potential of -1.10 V.

Halocarbons oxidize vanadocene to the corresponding monohalide, e.g.:

VCp_{2} + MeI → VCp_{2}I + Me_{2}

== Related compounds ==
- (Cycloheptatrienyl)(cyclopentadienyl)vanadium (V(C_{5}H_{5})(C_{7}H_{7}))
- Vanadocene dichloride
