= (Cycloheptatrienyl)(cyclopentadienyl)vanadium =

Names
- Other names trovacene, TVC

Identifiers
CAS Number	12636-68-9
3D model (JSmol)	Interactive image
ChemSpider	10138242
PubChem CID	153696716
- InChI: InChI=1S/C7H7.C5H5.V/c1-2-4-6-7-5-3-1;1-2-4-5-3-1;/h1-5H,6H2;1-5H;/q2*-1;+2 Key: XTKKHYRECKNZQX-UHFFFAOYSA-N
- SMILES: C1C=CC=CC=[C-]1.[CH-]1C=CC=C1.[V+2]

Properties
Chemical formula	C_{12}H_{12}V
Molar mass	207.170 g·mol^{−1}
Appearance	purple solid
Density	1.447 g/cm^{3}
- Except where otherwise noted, data are given for materials in their standard state (at 25 °C [77 °F], 100 kPa). Infobox references

(Cycloheptatrienyl)(cyclopentadienyl)vanadium is an organovanadium compound with the formula V(C_{5}H_{5})(C_{7}H_{7}). It is a purple, paramagnetic, sublimable solid that is sensitive toward air. The structure has been confirmed by X-ray crystallography. This sandwich complex features cyclopentadienyl and cycloheptatrienyl ligands bound to vanadium. It was first prepared by heating a mixture of cycloheptatriene and cyclopentadienylvanadium tetracarbonyl. Many derivatives of trovacene are prepared by lithiation of the cyclopentadienyl ring.

== See also ==
- (Cycloheptatrienyl)(cyclopentadienyl)titanium
