= Chloranil =

Names
- IUPAC name 2,3,5,6-Tetrachlorocyclohexa-2,5-diene-1,4-dione
- Other names: p-Chloranil; Tetrachloro-1,4-benzoquinone; Tetrachloro-p-benzoquinone

Identifiers
CAS Number	118-75-2
3D model (JSmol)	Interactive image
ChEBI	CHEBI:36703
ChEMBL	ChEMBL192627
ChemSpider	8068
ECHA InfoCard	100.003.887
EC Number	204-274-4
KEGG	C18933
PubChem CID	8371
RTECS number	DK6825000
UNII	01W5X7N5XV
UN number	3077
CompTox Dashboard (EPA)	DTXSID2020266
- InChI: InChI=1S/C6Cl4O2/c7-1-2(8)6(12)4(10)3(9)5(1)11 Key: UGNWTBMOAKPKBL-UHFFFAOYSA-N; InChI=1/C6Cl4O2/c7-1-2(8)6(12)4(10)3(9)5(1)11 Key: UGNWTBMOAKPKBL-UHFFFAOYAV
- SMILES: ClC=1C(=O)C(\Cl)=C(\Cl)C(=O)C=1Cl

Properties
Chemical formula	C_{6}Cl_{4}O_{2}
Molar mass	245.86 g·mol^{−1}
Appearance	Yellow solid
Density	1.97 g⋅cm^{−3}
Melting point	298.3 °C (568.9 °F; 571.5 K)
Boiling point	Sublimes
Solubility in water	0.25 g/kg (20 °C (68 °F))
Solubility in Ethanol	Slightly soluble
Solubility in Chloroform	Slightly soluble
Solubility in Diethyl ether	Soluble
log P	2.3 (20 °C (68 °F))
Vapor pressure	1 hPa (71 °C (160 °F))
Magnetic susceptibility (χ)	−112.6×10^{−6} cm^{3}/mol

Structure
Crystal structure	Monoclinic
Space group	P2_{1}/c (C^{5}_{2h})
Point group	2/m
Lattice constant	a = 8.86 Å, b = 5.83 Å, c = 8.76 Å α = 90°, β = 72.6°, γ = 90°
Formula units (Z)	2

Hazards
- GHS labelling
Pictograms	(GHS05: Corrosive) (GHS07: Exclamation mark) (GHS09: Environmental hazard)
Signal word	Danger
Hazard statements	H315, H317, H318, H410
Precautionary statements	P261, P264, P272, P273, P280, P302+P352, P305+P351+P338+P310, P333+P313, P362, P391, P501
NFPA 704 (fire diamond)	3 1 0
Flash point	>100 °C (212 °F)
Autoignition temperature	>400 °C (752 °F)
- Lethal dose or concentration (LD, LC)
LD_{50} (median dose)	4000 mg/kg (rat, oral)
LC_{50} (median concentration)	24.85 mg/m^{3} (rat, inhalation, 4h)
- Except where otherwise noted, data are given for materials in their standard state (at 25 °C [77 °F], 100 kPa). verify (what is ?) Infobox references

Chloranil is a quinone with the molecular formula C_{6}Cl_{4}O_{2}. Also known as tetrachloro-1,4-benzoquinone, it is a yellow solid. Like the parent benzoquinone, chloranil is a planar molecule that functions as a mild oxidant.

== Synthesis and use as reagent ==
Chloranil is produced by chlorination of phenol to give hexachlorocyclohexa-2,5-dien-1-one ("hexachlorophenol"). Hydrolysis of the dichloromethylene group in this dienone gives chloranil:

C_{6}H_{5}OH + 6 Cl_{2} → C_{6}Cl_{6}O + 6 HCl
C_{6}Cl_{6}O + H_{2}O → C_{6}Cl_{4}O_{2} + 2 HCl

Chloroanil serves as a hydrogen acceptor. It is more electrophilic than quinone itself. It is used for the aromatization reactions, such as the conversion of cyclohexadienes to the benzene derivatives.

Chloranil is used to test for free secondary amines. This test is useful for checking for the presence of proline derivatives. It is also a good test for the successful deprotection of a secondary amine. Secondary amines react with chloranil to give a brown/red/orange derivative, the colour depending on the amine. In these reactions, the amine displaces chloride from the ring of the quinone.

== Commercial applications ==
It is a precursor to many dyes, such as pigment violet 23 and diaziquone (AZQ), a cancer chemotherapeutic agent.

== See also ==
- Chloranilic acid
- 2,3-Dichloro-5,6-dicyano-1,4-benzoquinone (DDQ)
