= Zirconocene dichloride =

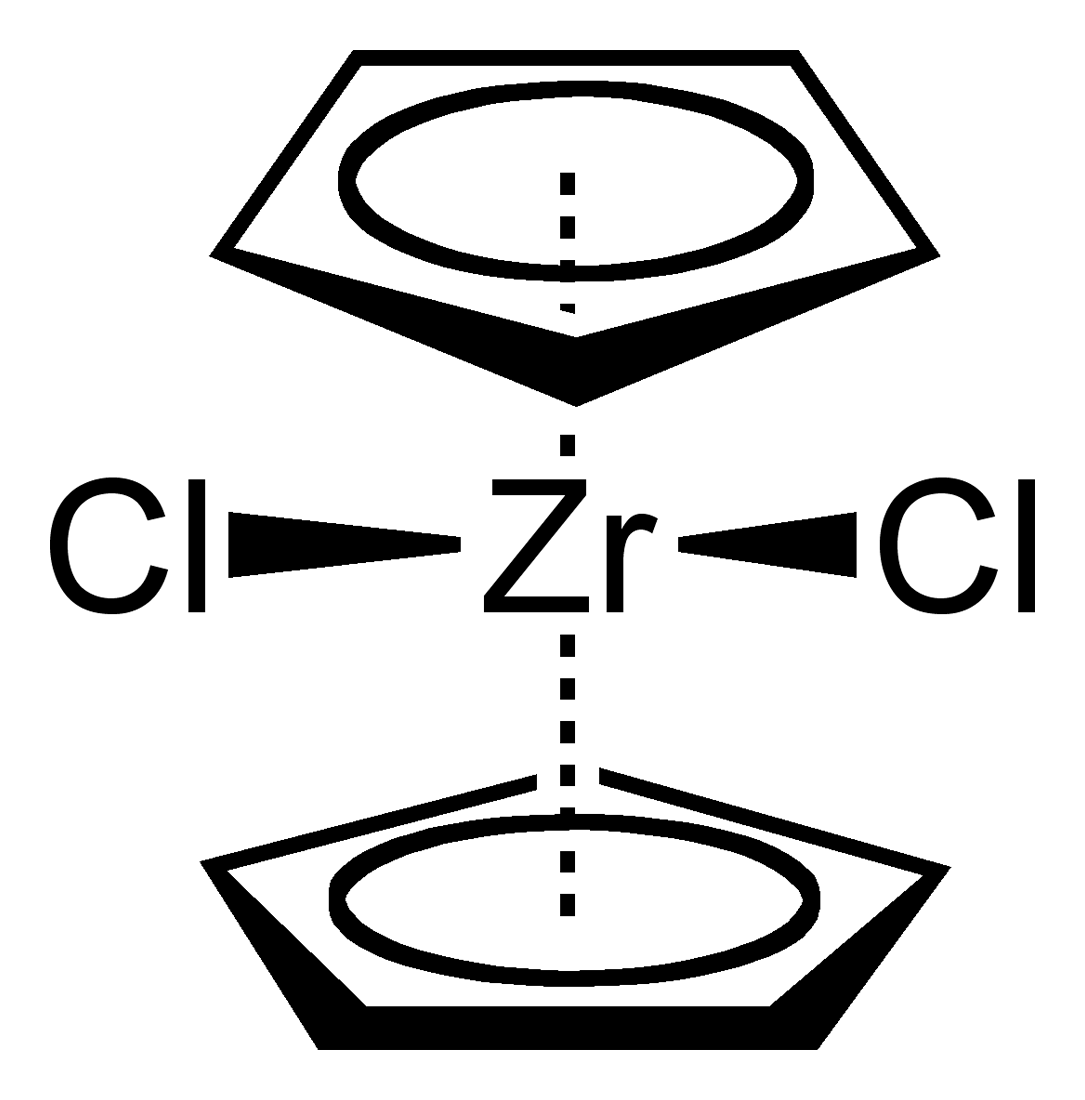

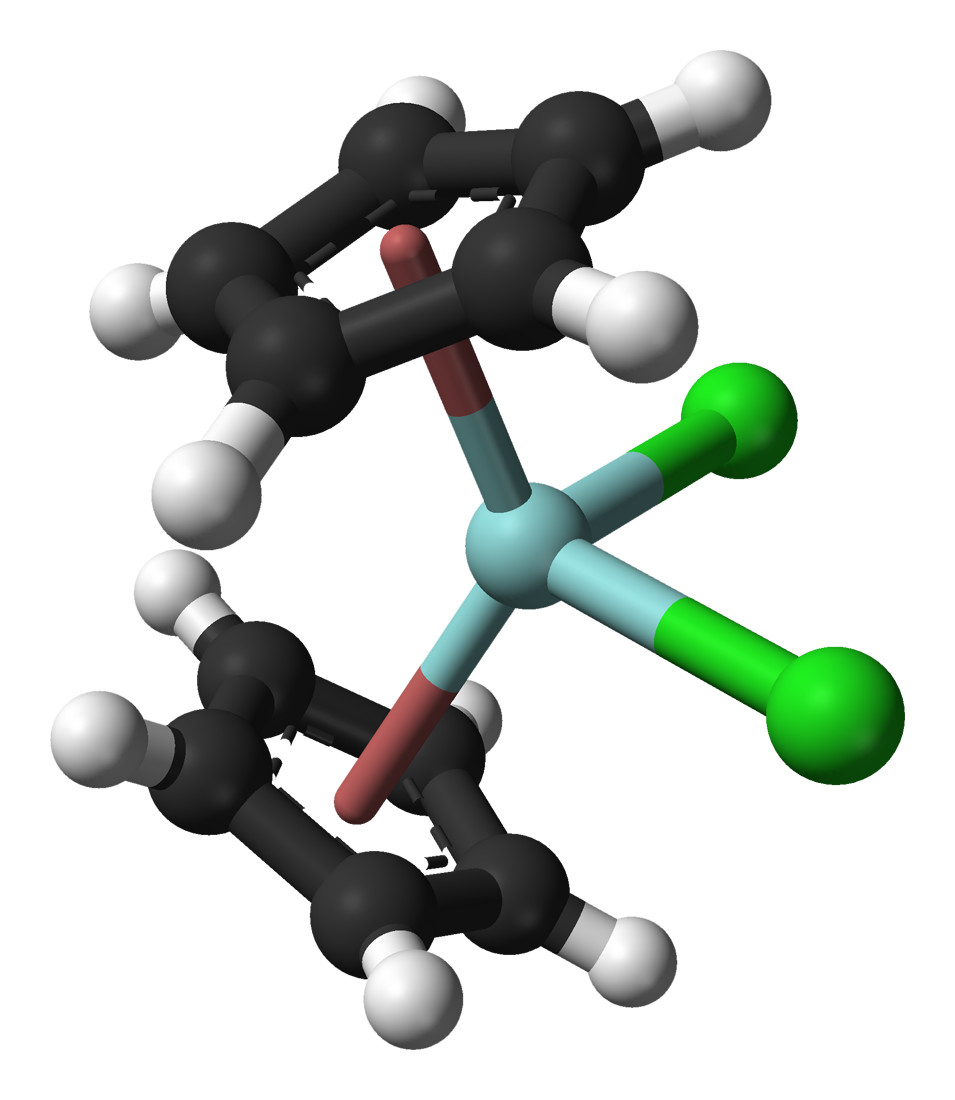

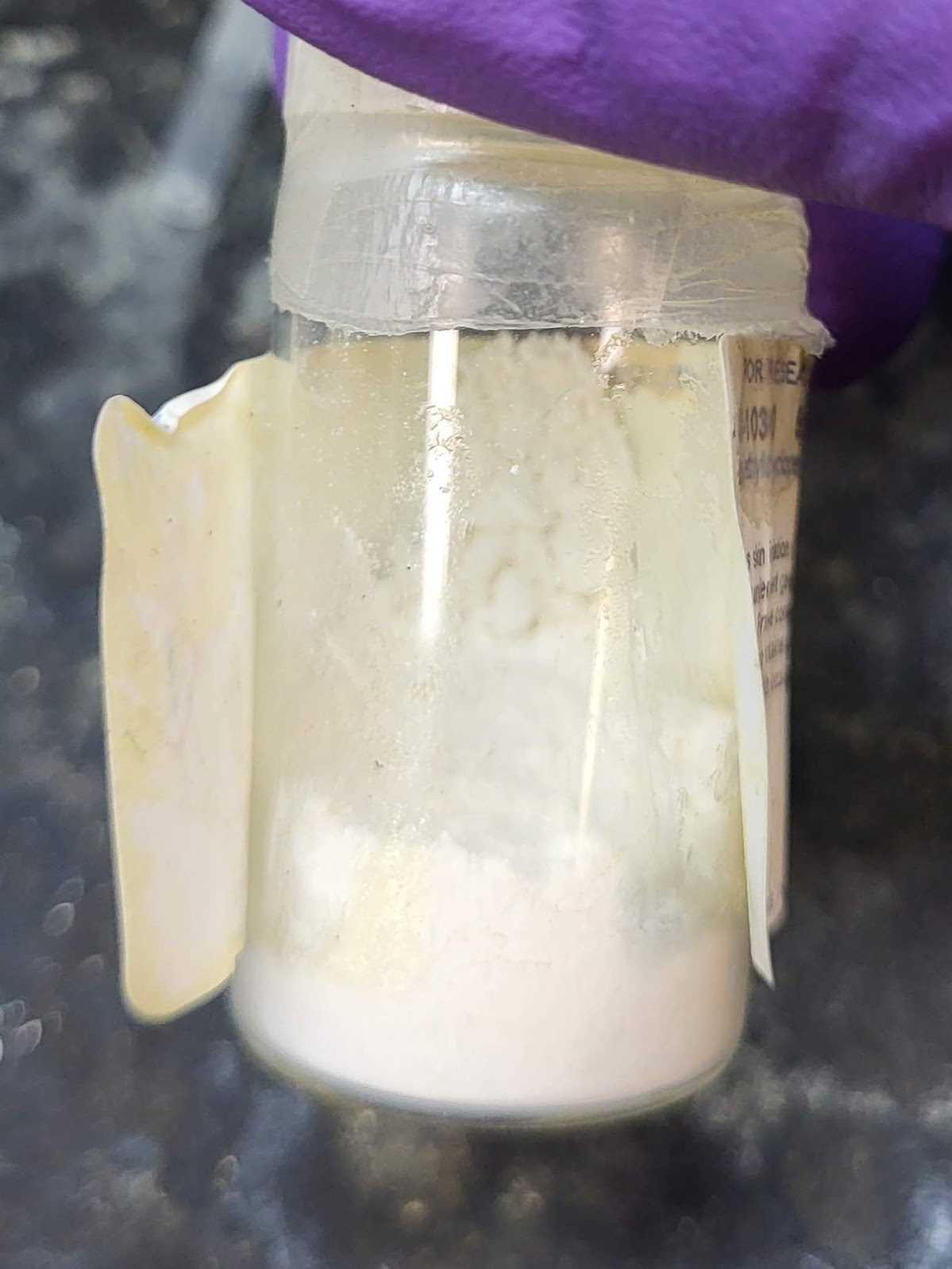

Identifiers
CAS Number	1291-32-3
3D model (JSmol)	Interactive image
ChemSpider	29081433
ECHA InfoCard	100.013.697
PubChem CID	10891641
UNII	SQE0U3LG60
CompTox Dashboard (EPA)	DTXSID7026318
- InChI: InChI=1S/2C5H5.2ClH.Zr/c2*1-2-4-5-3-1;;;/h2*1-5H;2*1H;/q2*-1;;;+4/p-2 Key: QMBQEXOLIRBNPN-UHFFFAOYSA-L; InChI=1/2C5H5.2ClH.Zr/c2*1-2-4-5-3-1;;;/h2*1-5H;2*1H;/q2*-1;;;+4/p-2 Key: QMBQEXOLIRBNPN-NUQVWONBAX
- SMILES: [cH-]1cccc1.[cH-]1cccc1.[Cl-].[Cl-].[Zr+4]

Properties
Chemical formula	C_{10}H_{10}Cl_{2}Zr
Molar mass	292.31 g·mol^{−1}
Appearance	white solid
Solubility in water	Soluble (Hydrolysis)

Hazards
Safety data sheet (SDS)	CAMEO Chemicals MSDS

Related compounds
Related compounds	Titanocene dichloride Hafnocene dichloride Vanadocene dichloride Niobocene dichloride Tantalocene dichloride Tungstenocene dichloride
- Except where otherwise noted, data are given for materials in their standard state (at 25 °C [77 °F], 100 kPa). verify (what is ?) Infobox references

Zirconocene dichloride is an organozirconium compound composed of a zirconium central atom, with two cyclopentadienyl and two chloro ligands. It is a colourless diamagnetic solid that is somewhat stable in air.

== Preparation and structure ==
Zirconocene dichloride may be prepared from zirconium(IV) chloride-tetrahydrofuran complex and sodium cyclopentadienide:

ZrCl_{4}(THF)_{2} + 2 NaCp → Cp_{2}ZrCl_{2} + 2 NaCl + 2 THF

The closely related compound Cp_{2}ZrBr_{2} was first described by Birmingham and Wilkinson.

The compound is a bent metallocene: the Cp rings are not parallel, the average Cp(centroid)-M-Cp angle being 128°. The Cl-Zr-Cl angle of 97.1° is wider than in niobocene dichloride (85.6°) and molybdocene dichloride (82°). This trend helped to establish the orientation of the HOMO in this class of complex.

== Reactions ==
=== Schwartz's reagent ===
Zirconocene dichloride reacts with lithium aluminium hydride to give Cp_{2}ZrHCl Schwartz's reagent:

(C_{5}H_{5})_{2}ZrCl_{2} + ^{1}/_{4} LiAlH_{4} → (C_{5}H_{5})_{2}ZrHCl + ^{1}/_{4} LiAlCl_{4}

Since lithium aluminium hydride is a strong reductant, some over-reduction occurs to give the dihydrido complex, Cp_{2}ZrH_{2}; treatment of the product mixture with methylene chloride converts it to Schwartz's reagent.

=== Negishi reagent ===
Zirconocene dichloride can also be used to prepare the Negishi reagent, Cp_{2}Zr(η^{2}-butene), which can be used as a source of Cp_{2}Zr in oxidative cyclisation reactions. The Negishi reagent is prepared by treating zirconocene dichloride with n-BuLi, leading to replacement of the two chloride ligands with butyl groups. The dibutyl compound subsequently undergoes beta-hydride elimination to give one η^{2}-butene ligand, with the other butyl ligand promptly lost as butane via reductive elimination.

=== Carboalumination ===
Zirconocene dichloride catalyzes the carboalumination of alkynes by trimethylaluminium to give a (alkenyl)dimethylalane, a versatile intermediate for further cross coupling reactions for the synthesis of stereodefined trisubstituted olefins. For example, α-farnesene can be prepared as a single stereoisomer by carboalumination of 1-buten-3-yne with trimethylaluminium, followed by palladium-catalyzed coupling of the resultant vinylaluminium reagent with geranyl chloride.

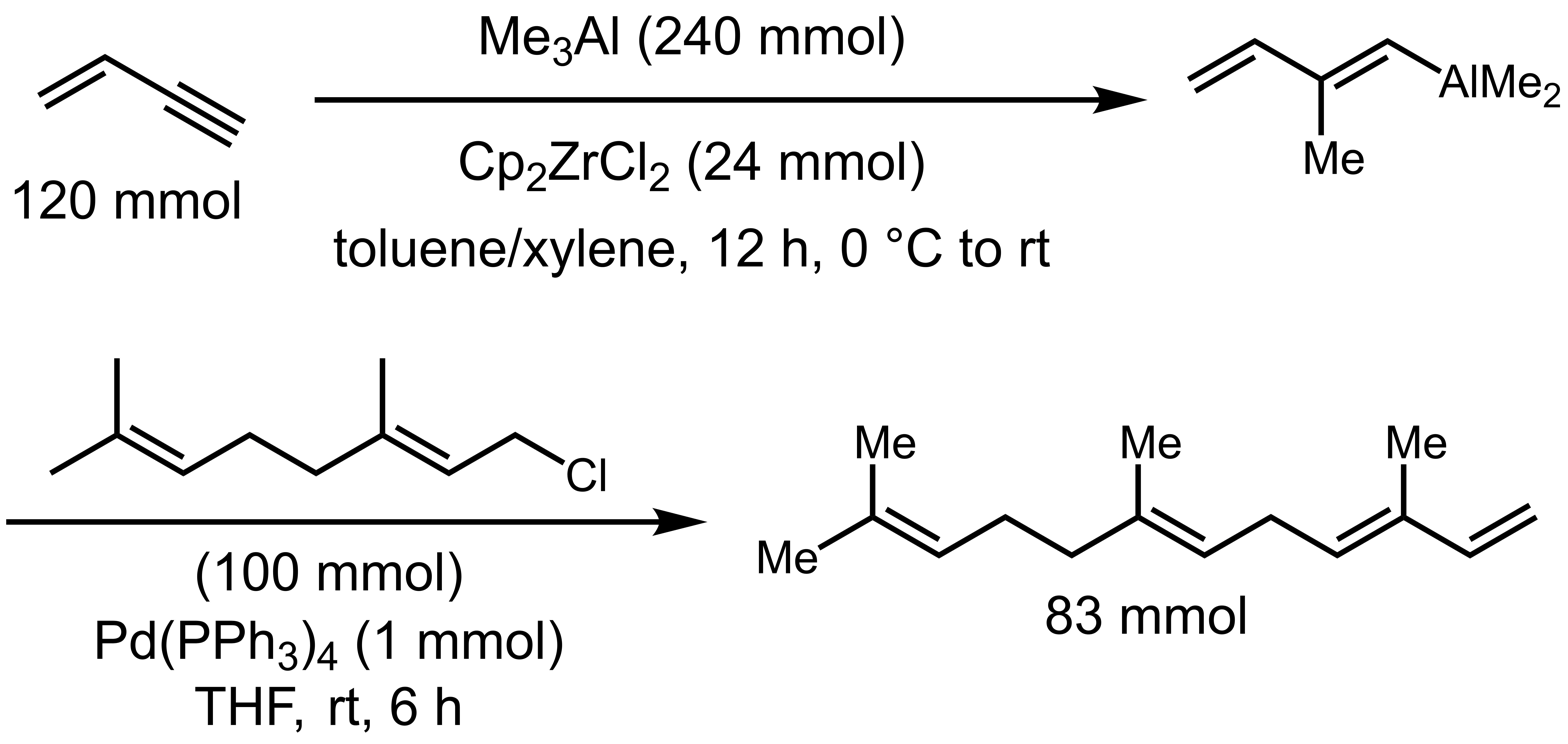

The use of trimethylaluminium for this reaction results in exclusive formation of the syn-addition product and, for terminal alkynes, the anti-Markovnikov addition with high selectivity (generally > 10:1). Unfortunately, the use of higher alkylaluminium reagents results in lowered yield, due to the formation of the hydroalumination product (via β-hydrogen elimination of the alkylzirconium intermediate) as side product, and only moderate regioselectivities. Thus, practical applications of the carboalumination reaction are generally confined to the case of methylalumination. Although this is a major limitation, the synthetic utility of this process remains significant, due to the frequent appearance of methyl-substituted alkenes in natural products.

=== Zr-walk ===
Zirconocene dichloride together with a reducing reagent can form the zirconocene hydride catalyst in situ, which allows a positional isomerization (so-called "Zr-walk"), and ends up with a cleavage of allylic bonds. Not only individual steps under stoichiometric conditions were described with Schwartz reagent, and Negishi reagent, but also catalytic applications on alkene hydroaluminations, radical cyclisation, polybutadiene cleavage, and reductive removal of functional groups were reported.

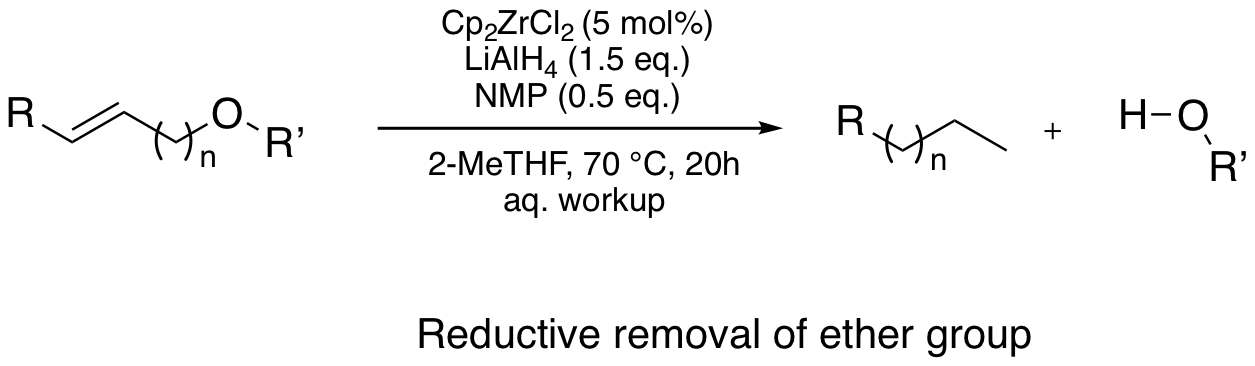
Reductive removal of ether group
