= Hafnocene dichloride =

Names
- Other names bis(cyclopentadienyl)hafnium dichloride

Identifiers
CAS Number	12116-66-4
3D model (JSmol)	Interactive image
ChemSpider	10654717
ECHA InfoCard	100.031.967
EC Number	235-177-5
PubChem CID	24942143
- InChI: InChI=1S/2C5H5.2ClH.Hf/c2*1-2-4-5-3-1;;;/h2*1-3H,4H2;2*1H;/q2*-1;;;+4/p-2 Key: IXKLRFLZVHXNCF-UHFFFAOYSA-L
- SMILES: C1C=CC=[C-]1.C1C=CC=[C-]1.[Cl-].[Cl-].[Hf+4]

Properties
Chemical formula	C_{10}H_{10}Cl_{2}Hf
Molar mass	379.58 g·mol^{−1}
Appearance	white solid
Melting point	230–233 °C (446–451 °F; 503–506 K)

Hazards
- GHS labelling
Pictograms	(GHS05: Corrosive) (GHS07: Exclamation mark)
Signal word	Danger
Hazard statements	H314, H315, H319, H335
Precautionary statements	P260, P264, P264+P265, P271, P280, P301+P330+P331, P302+P352, P302+P361+P354, P304+P340, P305+P351+P338, P305+P354+P338, P316, P319, P321, P332+P317, P337+P317, P362+P364, P363, P403+P233, P405, P501
- Except where otherwise noted, data are given for materials in their standard state (at 25 °C [77 °F], 100 kPa). Infobox references

Hafnocene dichloride is the organohafnium compound with the formula (C_{5}H_{5})_{2}HfCl_{2}. It is a white solid that is sparingly soluble in some organic solvents. The lighter homologues zirconacene dichloride and titanocene dichloride have received much more attention. While hafnocene is only of academic interest, some more soluble derivatives are precatalysts for olefin polymerization. Moreso than the Zr analogue, this compound is highly resistant to reduction.

It is prepared by a salt metathesis reaction from hafnium tetrachloride by salt metathesis:

2 NaC_{5}H_{5} + HfCl_{4} → (C_{5}H_{5})_{2}HfCl_{2} + 2 NaCl

== Derivatives ==
Hydrolysis gives the trimer [(C_{5}H_{5})_{2}HfO]_{3}.

The chloride ligands can be replaced by other halides.

The bis(phosphide) (C_{5}H_{5})_{2}Hf(PR_{2})_{2} can be prepared by salt metathesis from hafnocene dichloride.
