= Titanium compounds =

Chemical compounds containing titanium

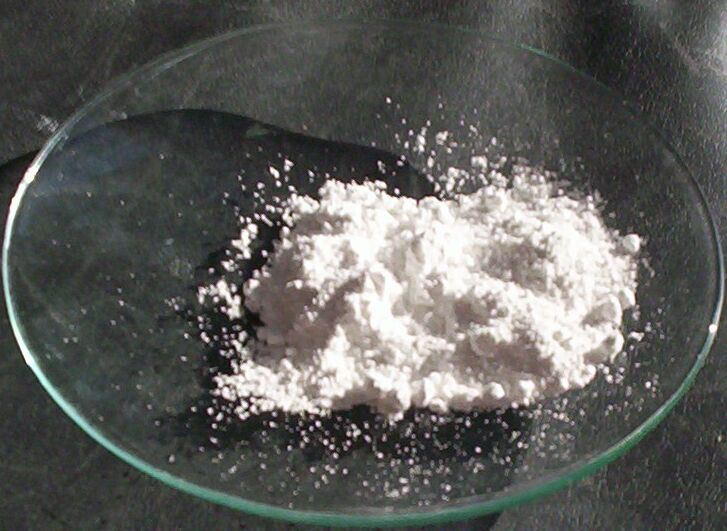
A sample of titanium dioxide, a compound of titanium

The +4 oxidation state dominates titanium chemistry, but compounds in the +3 oxidation state are also numerous. Commonly, titanium adopts an octahedral coordination geometry in its complexes, but tetrahedral TiCl_{4} is a notable exception. Because of its high oxidation state, titanium(IV) compounds exhibit a high degree of covalent bonding.

== Oxides, sulfides, and alkoxides ==
The most important oxide is TiO_{2}, which exists in three important polymorphs; anatase, brookite, and rutile. All three are white diamagnetic solids, although mineral samples can appear dark (see rutile). They adopt polymeric structures in which Ti is surrounded by six oxide ligands that link to other Ti centers.

The term titanates usually refers to titanium(IV) compounds, as represented by barium titanate (BaTiO_{3}). With a perovskite structure, this material exhibits piezoelectric properties and is used as a transducer in the interconversion of sound and electricity. Many minerals are titanates, such as ilmenite (FeTiO_{3}). Star sapphires and rubies get their asterism (star-forming shine) from the presence of titanium dioxide impurities.

A variety of reduced oxides (suboxides) of titanium are known, mainly reduced stoichiometries of titanium dioxide obtained by atmospheric plasma spraying. Ti_{3}O_{5}, described as a Ti(IV)-Ti(III) species, is a purple semiconductor produced by reduction of TiO_{2} with hydrogen at high temperatures, and is used industrially when surfaces need to be vapor-coated with titanium dioxide: it evaporates as pure TiO, whereas TiO_{2} evaporates as a mixture of oxides and deposits coatings with variable refractive index. Also known is Ti_{2}O_{3}, with the corundum structure, and TiO, with the rock salt structure, although often nonstoichiometric.

The alkoxides of titanium(IV), prepared by treating TiCl_{4} with alcohols, are colorless compounds that convert to the dioxide on reaction with water. They are industrially useful for depositing solid TiO_{2} via the sol-gel process. Titanium isopropoxide is used in the synthesis of chiral organic compounds via the Sharpless epoxidation.

Titanium forms a variety of sulfides, but only TiS_{2} has attracted significant interest. It adopts a layered structure and was used as a cathode in the development of lithium batteries. Because Ti(IV) is a "hard cation", the sulfides of titanium are unstable and tend to hydrolyze to the oxide with release of hydrogen sulfide.

== Nitrides and carbides ==
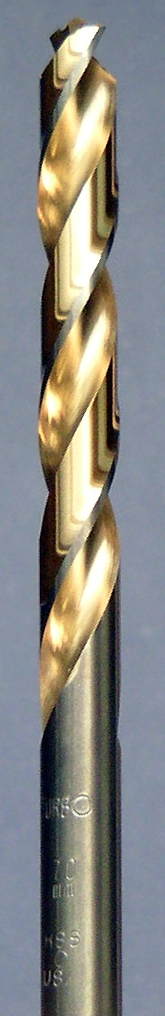
TiN-coated drill bit

Titanium nitride (TiN) is a refractory solid exhibiting extreme hardness, thermal/electrical conductivity, and a high melting point. TiN has a hardness equivalent to sapphire and carborundum (9.0 on the Mohs scale), and is often used to coat cutting tools, such as drill bits. It is also used as a gold-colored decorative finish and as a barrier layer in semiconductor fabrication. Titanium carbide (TiC), which is also very hard, is found in cutting tools and coatings.

== Halides ==
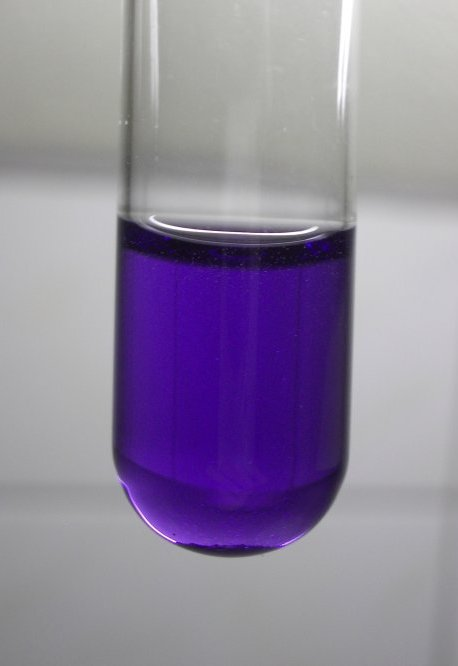
Titanium(III) compounds are characteristically violet, illustrated by this aqueous solution of titanium trichloride.

Titanium tetrachloride (titanium(IV) chloride, TiCl_{4}) is a colorless volatile liquid (commercial samples are yellowish) that, in air, hydrolyzes with spectacular emission of white clouds. Via the Kroll process, TiCl_{4} is used in the conversion of titanium ores to titanium metal. Titanium tetrachloride is also used to make titanium dioxide, e.g., for use in white paint. It is widely used in organic chemistry as a Lewis acid, for example in the Mukaiyama aldol condensation. In the van Arkel–de Boer process, titanium tetraiodide (TiI_{4}) is generated in the production of high purity titanium metal.

Titanium(III) and titanium(II) also form stable chlorides. A notable example is titanium(III) chloride (TiCl_{3}), which is used as a catalyst for production of polyolefins (see Ziegler–Natta catalyst) and a reducing agent in organic chemistry.

== Organometallic complexes ==
Owing to the important role of titanium compounds as polymerization catalyst, compounds with Ti-C bonds have been intensively studied. The most common organotitanium complex is titanocene dichloride ((C_{5}H_{5})_{2}TiCl_{2}). Related compounds include Tebbe's reagent and Petasis reagent. Titanium forms carbonyl complexes, e.g. (C_{5}H_{5})_{2}Ti(CO)_{2}.

== See also ==
- Chromium compounds
- Titanium alloy
- Group 4 element
