= Methylation =

Chemical process in which a methyl (CH3) group is covalently attached to a molecule

Methylation, in the chemical sciences, is the addition of a methyl group on a substrate, or the substitution of an atom (or group) by a methyl group. Methylation is a form of alkylation, with a methyl group replacing a hydrogen atom. These terms are commonly used in chemistry, biochemistry, soil science, and biology.

In biological systems, methylation is catalyzed by enzymes; such methylation can be involved in modification of heavy metals, regulation of gene expression, regulation of protein function, and RNA processing. In vitro methylation of tissue samples is also a way to reduce some histological staining artifacts. The reverse of methylation is demethylation.

== In biology ==
In biological systems, methylation is accomplished by enzymes. Methylation can modify heavy metals and can regulate gene expression, RNA processing, and protein function. It is a key process underlying epigenetics. Sources of methyl groups include S-methylmethionine, methyl folate, methyl B12, trimethylglycine.

=== Methanogenesis ===
Methanogenesis, the process that generates methane from CO_{2}, involves a series of methylation reactions. These reactions are caused by a set of enzymes harbored by a family of anaerobic microbes.

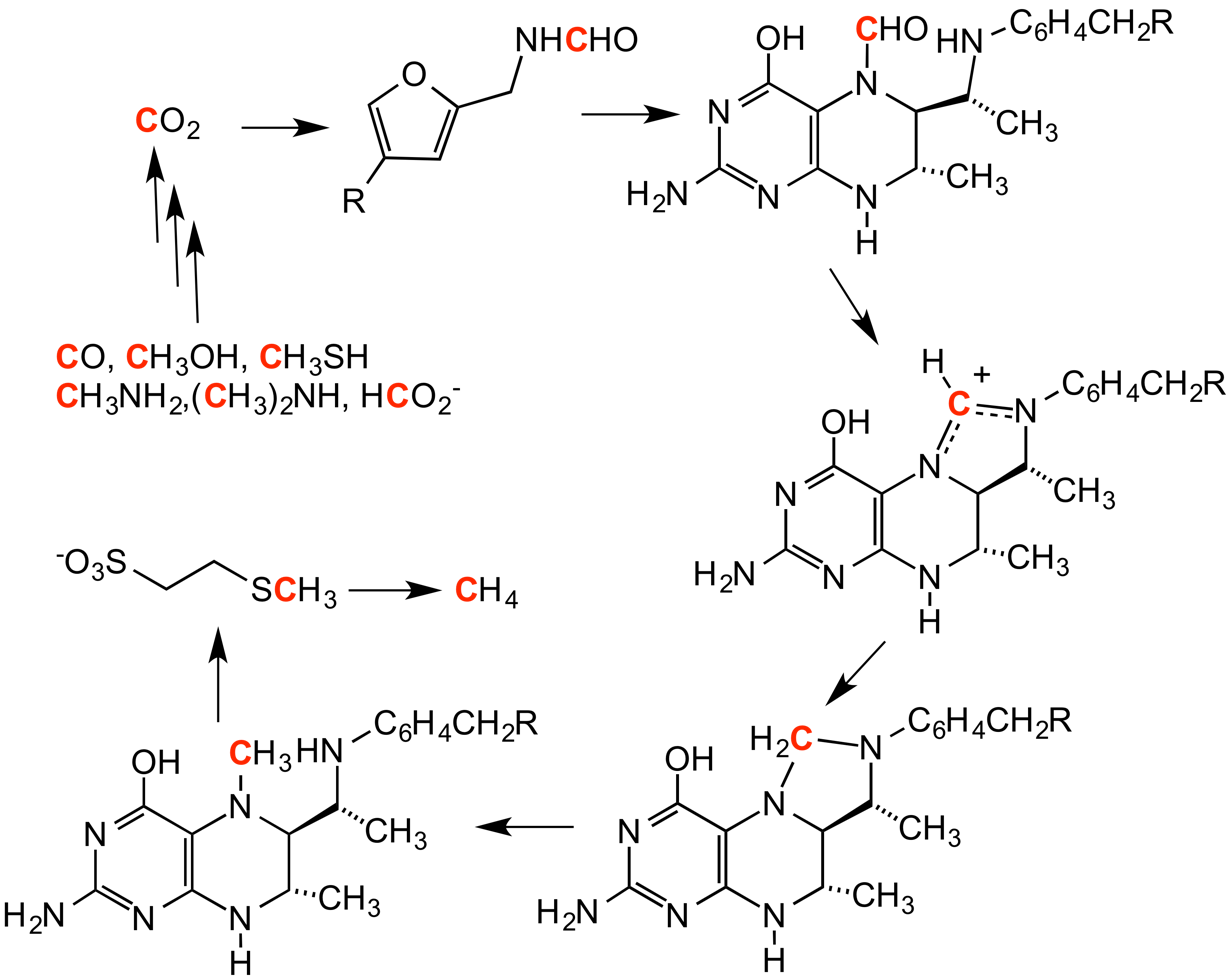
Cycle for methanogenesis, showing intermediates

In reverse methanogenesis, methane is the methylating agent.

=== O-methyltransferases ===
A wide variety of phenols undergo O-methylation to give anisole derivatives. This process, catalyzed by such enzymes as caffeoyl-CoA O-methyltransferase, is a key reaction in the biosynthesis of lignols, percursors to lignin, a major structural component of plants.

Plants produce flavonoids and isoflavones with methylations on hydroxyl groups, i.e. methoxy bonds. This 5-O-methylation affects the flavonoid's water solubility. Examples are 5-O-methylgenistein, 5-O-methylmyricetin, and 5-O-methylquercetin (azaleatin).

Many aromas such as methyl salicylate and methyl benzoate also arise via methyltransferases that employ S-adenosylmethionine as the methyl donor.

=== Proteins ===
Along with ubiquitination and phosphorylation, methylation is a major biochemical process for modifying protein function. The most prevalent protein methylations affect arginine and lysine residue of specific histones. Otherwise histidine, glutamate, asparagine, cysteine are susceptible to methylation. Some of these products include S-methylcysteine, two isomers of N-methylhistidine, and two isomers of N-methylarginine.

==== Methionine synthase ====
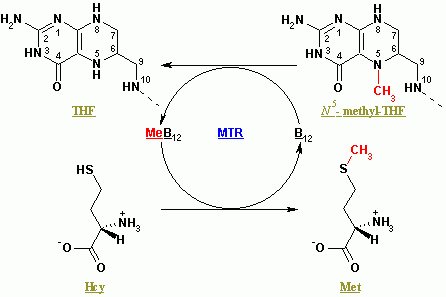
The methylation reaction catalyzed by methionine synthase

Methionine synthase regenerates methionine (Met) from homocysteine (Hcy). The overall reaction transforms 5-methyltetrahydrofolate (N^{5}-MeTHF) into tetrahydrofolate (THF) while transferring a methyl group to Hcy to form Met. Methionine Syntheses can be cobalamin-dependent and cobalamin-independent: Plants have both, animals depend on the methylcobalamin-dependent form.

In methylcobalamin-dependent forms of the enzyme, the reaction proceeds by two steps in a ping-pong reaction. The enzyme is initially primed into a reactive state by the transfer of a methyl group from N^{5}-MeTHF to Co(I) in enzyme-bound cobalamin ((Cob), also known as vitamine B12)), forming methyl-cobalamin (Me-Cob) that now contains Me-Co(III) and activating the enzyme. Then, a Hcy that has coordinated to an enzyme-bound zinc to form a reactive thiolate reacts with the Me-Cob. The activated methyl group is transferred from Me-Cob to the Hcy thiolate, which regenerates Co(I) in Cob, and Met is released from the enzyme.

=== Heavy metals: arsenic, mercury, cadmium ===
Biomethylation is the pathway for converting some heavy elements into more mobile or more lethal derivatives that can enter the food chain. The biomethylation of arsenic compounds starts with the formation of methanearsonates. Thus, trivalent inorganic arsenic compounds are methylated to give methanearsonate. S-adenosyl methionine is the methyl donor. The methanearsonates are the precursors to dimethylarsonates, again by the cycle of reduction (to methylarsonous acid) followed by a second methylation. Related pathways are found in the microbial methylation of mercury to methylmercury.

=== Epigenetic methylation ===
==== DNA methylation ====
DNA methylation is the conversion of the cytosine to 5-methylcytosine. The formation of Me-CpG is catalyzed by the enzyme DNA methyltransferase. In vertebrates, DNA methylation typically occurs at CpG sites (cytosine-phosphate-guanine sites—that is, sites where a cytosine is directly followed by a guanine in the DNA sequence). In mammals, DNA methylation is common in body cells, and methylation of CpG sites seems to be the default. Human DNA has about 80–90% of CpG sites methylated, but there are certain areas, known as CpG islands, that are CG-rich (high cytosine and guanine content, made up of about 65% CG residues), wherein none is methylated. These are associated with the promoters of 56% of mammalian genes, including all ubiquitously expressed genes. One to two percent of the human genome are CpG clusters, and there is an inverse relationship between CpG methylation and transcriptional activity. Methylation contributing to epigenetic inheritance can occur through either DNA methylation or protein methylation. Improper methylations of human genes can lead to disease development, including cancer.

In honey bees, DNA methylation is associated with alternative splicing and gene regulation based on functional genomic research published in 2013. In addition, DNA methylation is associated with expression changes in immune genes when honey bees were under lethal viral infection. Several review papers have been published on the topics of DNA methylation in social insects.

==== RNA methylation ====
RNA methylation occurs in different RNA species viz. tRNA, rRNA, mRNA, tmRNA, snRNA, snoRNA, miRNA, and viral RNA. Different catalytic strategies are employed for RNA methylation by a variety of RNA-methyltransferases. RNA methylation is thought to have existed before DNA methylation in the early forms of life evolving on earth.

N6-methyladenosine (m6A) is the most common and abundant methylation modification in RNA molecules (mRNA) present in eukaryotes. 5-methylcytosine (5-mC) also commonly occurs in various RNA molecules. Recent data strongly suggest that m6A and 5-mC RNA methylation affects the regulation of various biological processes such as RNA stability and mRNA translation, and that abnormal RNA methylation contributes to etiology of human diseases.

In social insects such as honey bees, RNA methylation is studied as a possible epigenetic mechanism underlying aggression via reciprocal crosses.

==== Protein methylation ====
Protein methylation typically takes place on arginine or lysine amino acid residues in the protein sequence. Arginine can be methylated once (monomethylated arginine) or twice, with either both methyl groups on one terminal nitrogen (asymmetric dimethylarginine) or one on both nitrogens (symmetric dimethylarginine), by protein arginine methyltransferases (PRMTs). Lysine can be methylated once, twice, or three times by lysine methyltransferases. Protein methylation has been most studied in the histones. The transfer of methyl groups from S-adenosyl methionine to histones is catalyzed by enzymes known as histone methyltransferases. Histones that are methylated on certain residues can act epigenetically to repress or activate gene expression. Protein methylation is one type of post-translational modification.

=== Evolution ===
Methyl metabolism is very ancient and can be found in all organisms on earth, from bacteria to humans, indicating the importance of methyl metabolism for physiology. Indeed, pharmacological inhibition of global methylation in species ranging from human, mouse, fish, fly, roundworm, plant, algae, and cyanobacteria causes the same effects on their biological rhythms, demonstrating conserved physiological roles of methylation during evolution.

== In chemistry ==
The term methylation in organic chemistry refers to the alkylation process used to describe the delivery of a CH_{3} group.

=== Electrophilic methylation ===
Methylations are commonly performed using electrophilic methyl sources such as iodomethane, dimethyl sulfate, dimethyl carbonate, or tetramethylammonium chloride. Less common but more powerful (and more dangerous) methylating reagents include methyl triflate, diazomethane, and methyl fluorosulfonate (magic methyl). These reagents all react via S_{N}2 nucleophilic substitutions. For example, a carboxylate may be methylated on oxygen to give a methyl ester; an alkoxide salt RO^{−} may be likewise methylated to give an ether, ROCH_{3}; or a ketone enolate may be methylated on carbon to produce a new ketone.

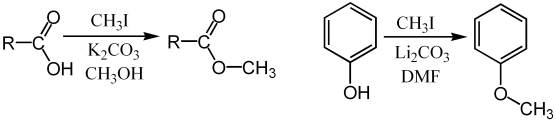

The Purdie methylation is a specific for the methylation at oxygen of carbohydrates using iodomethane and silver oxide.

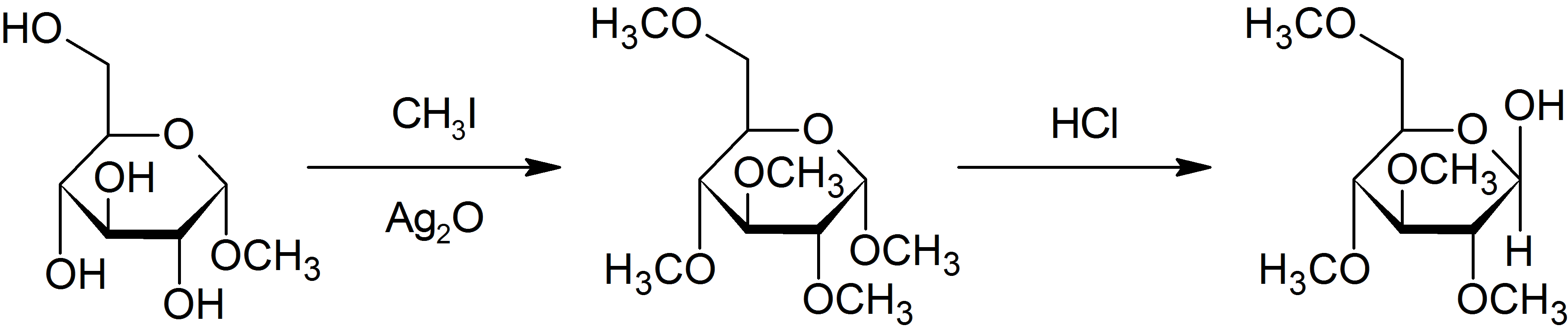

=== Eschweiler–Clarke methylation ===
The Eschweiler–Clarke reaction is a method for methylation of amines. The methyl groups are provided by the combination of formaldehyde (CH_{2} source) and formic acid (H^{-} source):

R_{2}NH + CH_{2}O + HCO_{2}H → R_{2}NCH_{3} + H_{2}O + CO_{2}

This method avoids the risk of quaternization, which occurs when amines are methylated with methyl halides.

=== Diazomethane and trimethylsilyldiazomethane ===
Diazomethane and the safer analogue trimethylsilyldiazomethane methylate carboxylic acids, phenols, and even alcohols:

$$\ce{RCO2H  +  tmsCHN2  +  CH3OH  -> RCO2CH3  +  CH3Otms  +  N2}$$

The method offers the advantage that the side products are easily removed from the product mixture.

=== Nucleophilic methylation ===
Methylation sometimes involve use of nucleophilic methyl reagents. Strongly nucleophilic methylating agents include methyllithium (CH_{3}Li) or Grignard reagents such as methylmagnesium bromide (CH_{3}MgX). For example, CH_{3}Li will add methyl groups to the carbonyl (C=O) of ketones and aldehyde.:

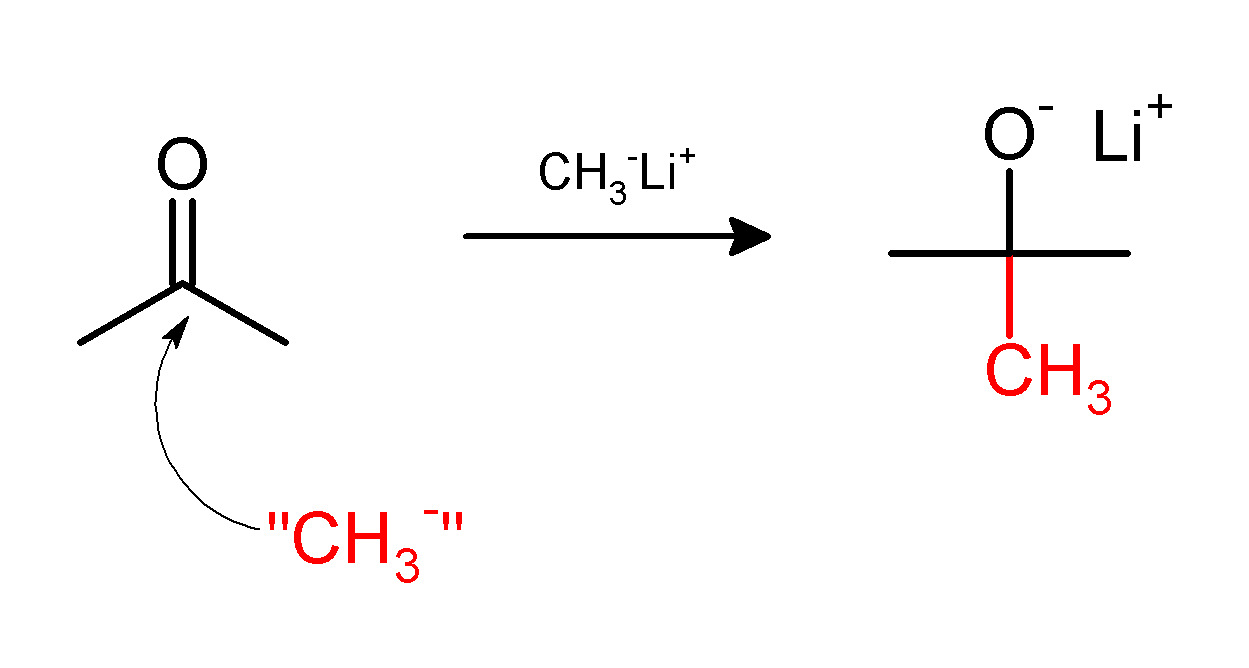

Milder methylating agents include tetramethyltin, dimethylzinc, and trimethylaluminium.

== See also ==
=== Biology topics ===
- Bisulfite sequencing – the biochemical method used to determine the presence or absence of methyl groups on a DNA sequence
- MethDB DNA Methylation Database
- Microscale thermophoresis – a biophysical method to determine the methylisation state of DNA
- Remethylation, the reversible removal of methyl group in methionine and 5-methylcytosine

=== Organic chemistry topics ===
- Alkylation
- Methoxy
- Titanium–zinc methylenation
- Petasis reagent
- Nysted reagent
- Wittig reaction
- Tebbe's reagent
