= Bioorganometallic chemistry =

Study of biologically active molecules that contain carbon-metal bonds

Bioorganometallic chemistry is the study of biologically active molecules that contain carbon directly bonded to metals or metalloids. The importance of main-group and transition-metal centers has long been recognized as important to the function of enzymes and other biomolecules. However, only a small subset of naturally occurring metal complexes and synthetically prepared pharmaceuticals are organometallic; that is, they feature a direct covalent bond between the metal(loid) and a carbon atom. The first, and for a long time, the only examples of naturally occurring bioorganometallic compounds were the cobalamin cofactors (vitamin B_{12}) in its various forms. In the 21st century, as a result of the discovery of new systems containing carbon–metal bonds in biology, bioorganometallic chemistry is rapidly emerging as a distinct subdiscipline of bioinorganic chemistry that straddles organometallic chemistry and biochemistry. Naturally occurring bioorganometallics include enzymes and sensor proteins. Also within this realm are synthetically prepared organometallic compounds that serve as new drugs and imaging agents (technetium-99m sestamibi) as well as the principles relevant to the toxicology of organometallic compounds (e.g., methylmercury). Consequently, bioorganometallic chemistry is increasingly relevant to medicine and pharmacology.

== In cofactors and prosthetic groups ==
Vitamin B_{12} is the preeminent bioorganometallic species. Vitamin B_{12} is actually a collection of related enzyme cofactors, several of which contain cobalt–alkyl bonds, and is involved in biological methylation and 1,2-carbon rearrangement reactions. For a long time since its structure was elucidated by Hodgkin in 1955, it was believed to be the only example of a naturally occurring bioorganometallic system.

Several bioorganometallic enzymes carry out reactions involving carbon monoxide. Carbon monoxide dehydrogenase (CODH) catalyzes the water–gas shift reaction, which provides CO (through a nickelacarboxylate intermediate) for the biosynthesis of acetylcoenzyme A. The latter step is effected by the Ni–Fe enzyme CO-methylating acetyl-CoA synthase (ACS). CODH and ACS often occur together in a tetrameric complex, the CO being transported via a tunnel and the methyl group being provided by methyl cobalamin.

Hydrogenases are bioorganometallic in the sense that their active sites feature Fe–CO functionalities, although the CO ligands are only spectators. The binuclear [FeFe]-hydrogenases have a Fe_{2}(μ-SR)_{2}(μ-CO)(CO)_{2}(CN)_{2} active site connected to a 4Fe4S cluster via a bridging thiolate. The active site of the [NiFe]-hydrogenases are described as (NC)_{2}(OC)Fe(μ-SR)_{2}Ni(SR)_{2} (where SR is cysteinyl). Mononuclear [Fe]-hydrogenases contain an Fe(CO)_{2}(SR)(LX) active site, where LX is a 6-acylmethyl-2-pyridinol ligand, bound to the Fe center through the pyridyl nitrogen (L) and the acyl carbon (X). This class of hydrogenases thus provides examples of naturally occurring iron acyl complexes.

Methanogenesis, the biosynthesis of methane, entails as its final step, the scission of a nickel–methyl bond in cofactor F430.

The iron–molybdenum cofactor (FeMoco) of nitrogenases contains an Fe_{6}C unit and is an example of an interstitial carbide found in biology.

The first example of a naturally occurring arylmetal species, a pincer complex containing a nickel–aryl bond, has been reported to form the active site of lactate racemase.

== In sensor proteins ==
Some [NiFe]-containing proteins are known to sense H_{2} and thus regulate transcription.

Copper-containing proteins are known to sense ethylene, which is known to be a hormone relevant to the ripening of fruit. This example illustrates the essential role of organometallic chemistry in nature, as few molecules outside of low-valent transition metal complexes reversibly bind alkenes. Cyclopropenes inhibit ripening by binding to the copper(I) center. Binding to copper is also implicated in the mammalian olfaction of olefins.

Carbon monoxide occurs naturally and is a transcription factor via its complex with a sensor protein based on ferrous porphyrins.

== In medicine ==
Organometallic compounds containing mercury (e.g., thiomersal) and arsenic (e.g. Salvarsan) had a long history of use in medicine as nonselective antimicrobials before the advent of modern antibiotics.

Titanocene dichloride displays anti-cancer activity, and dichloridobis[(p-methoxybenzyl)cyclopentadienyl]titanium is a current anticancer drug candidate. Arene- and cyclopentadienyl complexes are kinetically inert platforms for the design of new radiopharmaceuticals.

Furthermore, there have been made studies utilizing exogenous semi-synthetic ligands; specifically to the dopamine transporter, observing increased resultant efficacy in regard to reward facilitating behavior (incentive salience) and habituation, namely with the phenyltropane compound [η^{6}-(2β-carbomethoxy-3β-phenyl)tropane]tricarbonylchromium.

Carbon monoxide releasing organometallic compounds are also actively investigated, due to the importance of carbon monoxide as a gasotransmitter.

== Toxicology ==
Within the realm of bioorganometallic chemistry is the study of the fates of synthetic organometallic compounds. Tetraethyllead has received considerable attention in this regard as has its successors such as methylcyclopentadienyl manganese tricarbonyl. Methylmercury is a particularly infamous case; this cation is produced by the action of vitamin B_{12}-related enzymes on mercury.
