= Titanocene pentasulfide =

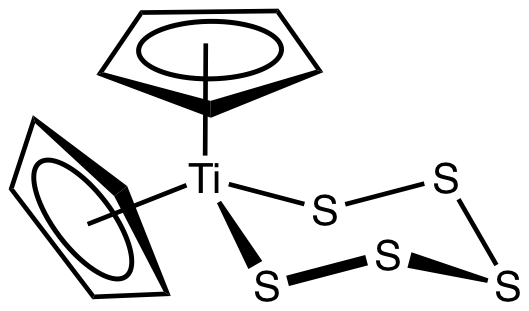

Names
- Other names titanocene pentasulfide

Identifiers
| CAS Number | 12116-82-4 |
| 3D model (JSmol) | Interactive image |
| ChemSpider | 57542900 |
| PubChem CID | 92000650 |
| CompTox Dashboard (EPA) | DTXSID50746542 |
- InChI: InChI=1S/2C5H5.H2S5.Ti/c2*1-2-4-5-3-1;1-3-5-4-2;/h2*1-5H;1-2H;/q2*-1;;+4/p-2 Key: JDSOAGYVYGEMJJ-UHFFFAOYSA-L
- SMILES: [CH-]1C=CC=C1.[CH-]1C=CC=C1.S1SSSS[Ti2+]1

Properties
| Chemical formula | C_{10}H_{10}S_{5}Ti |
| Molar mass | 338.382 |
| Appearance | red solid |

Structure
| Coordination geometry | Distorted tetrahedral at Ti atom |

Related compounds
| Related compounds | Zirconocene pentasulfide Titanocene dichloride |
- Except where otherwise noted, data are given for materials in their standard state (at 25 °C [77 °F], 100 kPa). Infobox references

Titanocene pentasulfide is the organotitanium compound with the formula (C_{5}H_{5})_{2}TiS_{5}, commonly abbreviated as Cp_{2}TiS_{5}, where Cp stands for cyclopentadienyl. This metallocene exists as a bright red solid that is soluble in organic solvents. It is of academic interest as a precursor to unusual allotropes of elemental sulfur as well as some related inorganic rings.

== Preparation and structure ==
Titanocene pentasulfide is prepared by treating Cp_{2}TiCl_{2} with polysulfide salts: It was first produced by the addition of elemental sulfur to titanocene dicarbonyl:

(C_{5}H_{5})_{2}Ti(CO)_{2} + 5/8 S_{8} → (C_{5}H_{5})_{2}TiS_{5} + 2 CO

The complex is viewed as a pseudotetrahedral complex of Ti(IV). The Ti–S distances are 2.420 and 2.446 Å and the S–S bond distances are of a normal range, 2.051–2.059 Å. The molecule exhibits a dynamic NMR spectrum owing to the chair–chair equilibrium of the TiS_{5} ring which equivalizes the Cp signals at high temperatures.

== Reactions ==
Cp_{2}TiS_{5} reacts with sulfur and selenium chlorides, E_{x}Cl_{2}, to afford titanocene dichloride and various S_{5+x} and S_{5}Se_{x} rings. Illustrative is the synthesis of S_{7} from disulfur dichloride:

(C_{5}H_{5})_{2}TiS_{5} + S_{2}Cl_{2} → (C_{5}H_{5})_{2}TiCl_{2} + S_{7}

It also reacts with alkenes and ketenes to give heterocycles composed of Ti, C and S. With trialkylphosphines, the cycle dimerize into rings of various sizes, depending on the trialkylphosphine used.

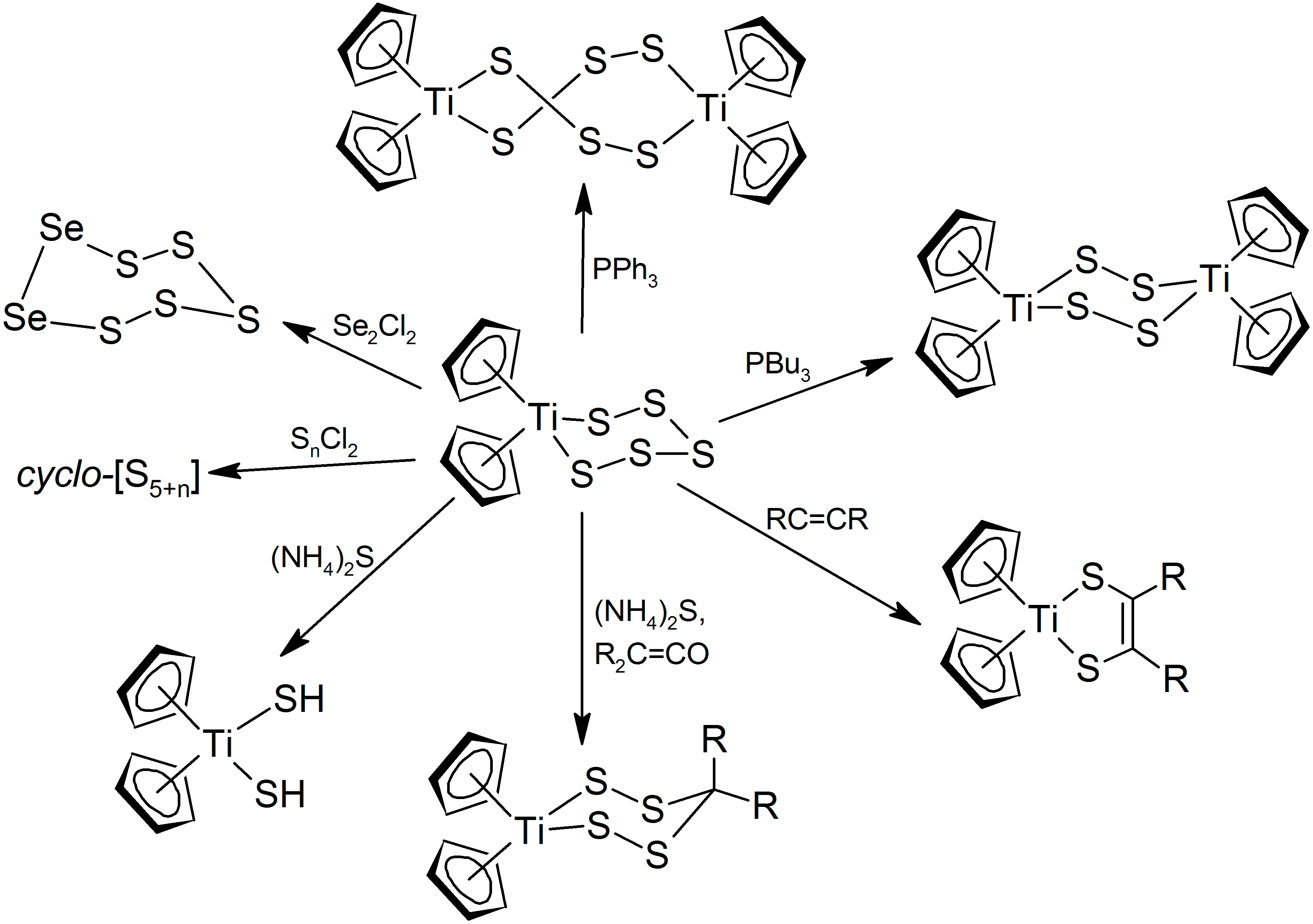
Selected reactions of titanocene pentasulfide
