= Organotitanium chemistry =

Carbon-titanium bond

Organotitanium chemistry is the science of organotitanium compounds describing their physical properties, synthesis, and reactions. Organotitanium compounds in organometallic chemistry contain carbon-titanium chemical bonds. They are reagents in organic chemistry and are involved in major industrial processes.

== Brief history ==
Although the first attempt to prepare an organotitanium compound dates back to 1861, the first example was not reported until 1954. In that year titanocene dichloride was described by Wilkinson and Birmingham. Independently, titanium-based Ziegler–Natta catalysts were described leading to major commercial applications, for which the 1963 Nobel Prize in Chemistry was awarded. This technology underscored the technical significance of organotitanium chemistry.

== Properties ==
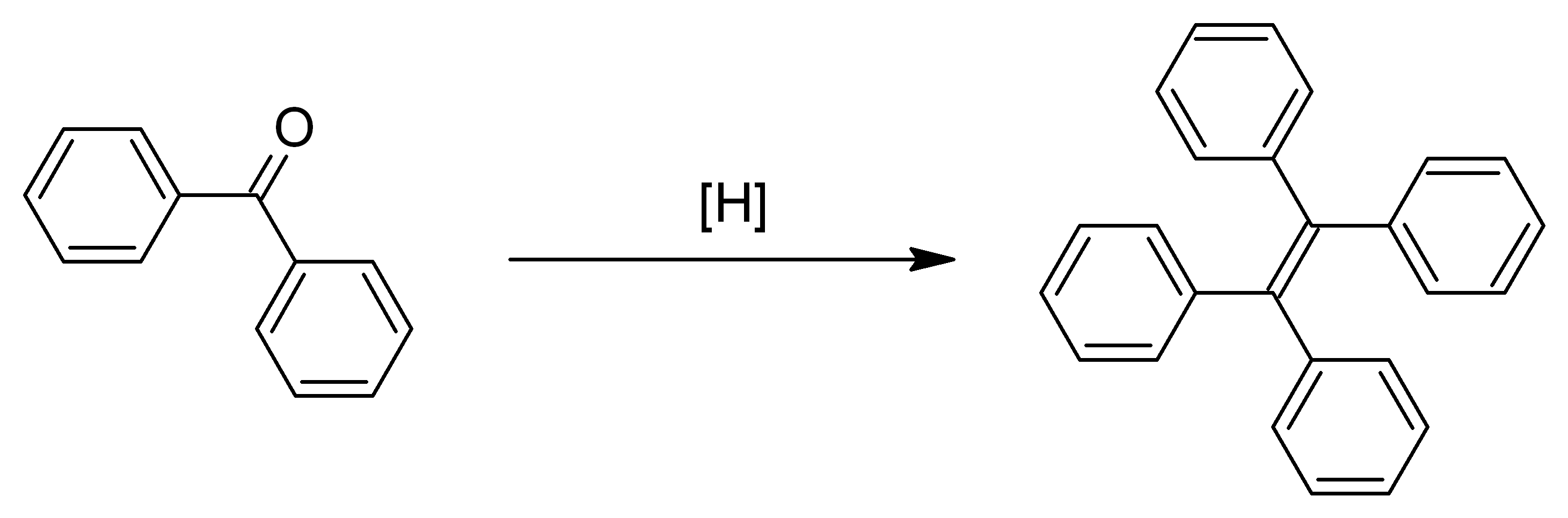
The reductive coupling of benzophenone in the McMurry reaction illustrates the oxophilicity of low valent titanium complexes.

The titanium electron configuration ([Ar]3d^{2}4s^{2}) vaguely resembles that of carbon and like carbon, the +4 oxidation state dominates. Titanium is however a much larger element than carbon, reflected by the Ti-C bond lengths being about 30% longer, e.g. 210 pm in tetrabenzyltitanium vs a typical C-C bond of 155 pm. Simple tetraalkyltitanium compounds however are not typically isolable, owing to the large size of titanium and the electron-deficient nature of its tetrahedral complexes. More abundant and more useful than the simple tetraalkyl compounds are mixed ligand complexes with alkoxide and cyclopentadienyl coligands. Titanium is capable of forming complexes with high coordination numbers.

In terms of oxidation states, most organotitanium chemistry, in solution at least, focuses on derivatives of titanium in the oxidation states of +3 and +4. Compounds of titanium in the +2 oxidation state are rarer, examples being titanocene dicarbonyl and Ti(CH_{3})_{2}(dmpe)_{2}. [Ti(CO)_{6}]^{2−} is formally a complex of titanium in the oxidation state of −2. Although Ti(III) is involved in Ziegler–Natta catalysis, the organic derivatives of Ti(III) are uncommon. One example is the dimer [Cp_{2}Ti^{III}Cl]_{2}.

Due to the low electronegativity of titanium, Ti-C bonds are polarized toward carbon. Consequently, alkyl ligands in many titanium compounds are nucleophilic. Titanium is characteristically oxophilic, which recommends the use of air-free techniques. On the other hand, high oxophilicity means that titanium alkyls are effective for abstracting or exchanging organyl ligands for oxo groups, as discussed below.

== Compounds ==
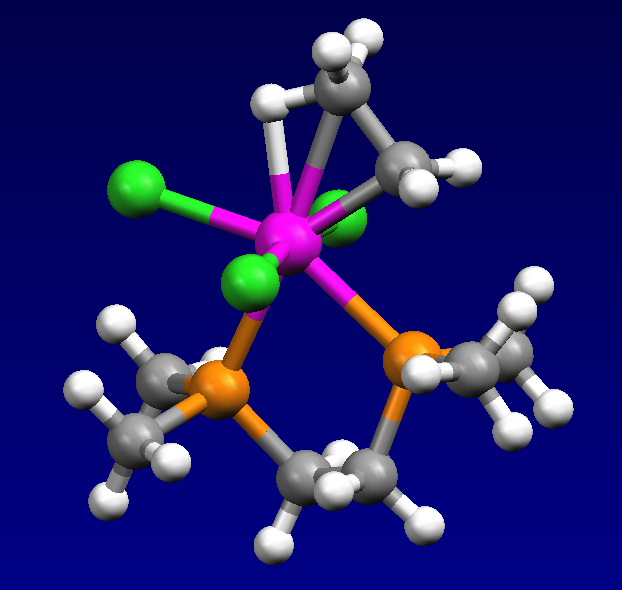
Structure of (CH_{3}CH_{2})TiCl_{3}(dmpe), highlighting an agostic interaction between the methyl group and the Ti(IV) center.

=== Alkyl titanium chlorides ===
Simple alkyl complexes of titanium, e.g. Ti(CH_{2}Ph)_{4}, where Ph is phenyl, are rare. Several mixed alkyl-titanium-halides and alkyl-titanium-alkoxides are utilized in organic synthesis, even if they are not often well characterized. At least from the commercial perspective, the most useful organotitanium compounds are generated by combining titanium(III) chloride and diethylaluminium chloride. As Ziegler–Natta catalysts, such species efficiently catalyze the polymerization of ethene. The process is heterogeneous and no organotitanium intermediates have been well characterized for this process.

Numerous organotitanium reagents are produced by combining titanium tetrachloride, titanium tetraalkoxides, or mixtures thereof with organolithium, organomagnesium, and organozinc compounds. Such compounds find occasional use as stoichiometric reagents in organic synthesis. Methyltitanium trichloride, nominally CH_{3}TiCl_{3}, can be prepared by treating titanium(IV) chloride with dimethylzinc in dichloromethane at −78 °C. It delivers a methyl groups to carbonyl compounds and alkyl halides. "Methyltriisopropoxytitanium" is a related reagent. A dialkyltitanium species is implicated for Ti-promoted cyclopropanations starting from a Grignard reagent and an ester. This reaction is the basis of the Kulinkovich reaction:

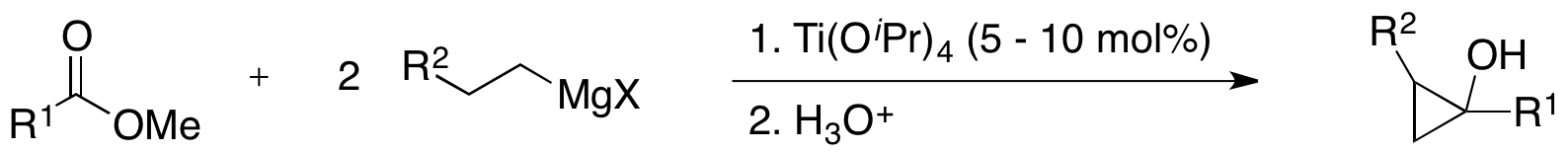
Kulinkovich reaction

"Lombardo's reagent" is used for methylenation. It is functionally related to the Dibromomethane-Zinc-Titanium(IV) Chloride reagent. This chemistry addresses a shortcoming of the Wittig reagent by methylenating enolisable carbonyl groups without loss of stereochemical integrity (Lombardo Methylenation). It can for example also be applied in a conversion of a ketene into an allene:

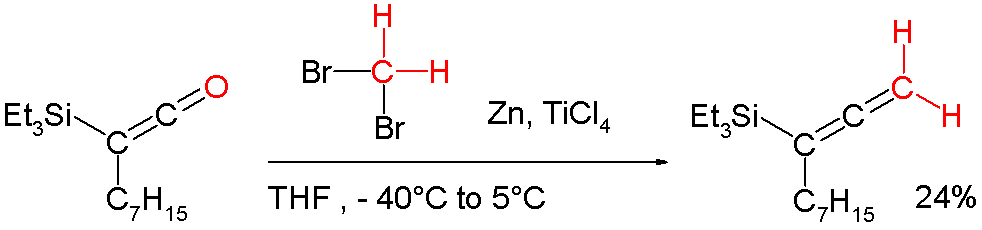

=== Titanocene derivatives ===
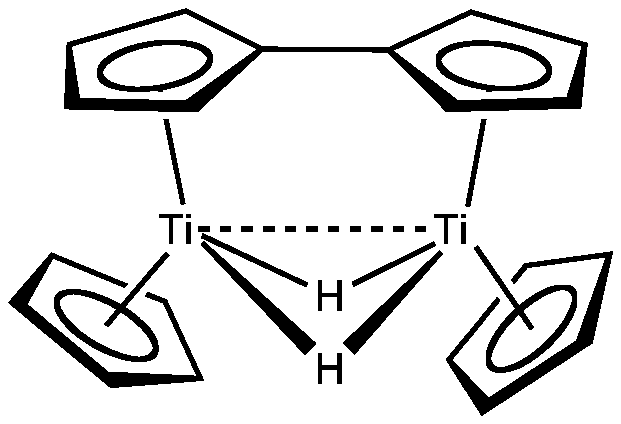
The structure of "titanocene" is not Ti(C_{5}H_{5})_{2}, but a fulvalene complex

Attempted synthesis of "titanocene", i.e. Ti(C_{5}H_{5})_{2}, produces a fulvalene complex. The titanocene dimer was recognised in the 1970s but not structurally characterised until 1992, and the investigations led to many innovations on cyclopentadienyl complexes of titanium. Only in 1998 was a true titanocene derivative identified, the paramagnetic species (C_{5}(CH_{3})_{4}Si(CH_{3})_{3})_{2}Ti.

In contrast to titanocene itself, titanocene dichloride and to some extent titanocene monochloride have rich and well defined chemistries. Tebbe's reagent, prepared from titanocene dichloride and trimethylaluminium, is used as a methylenation agent (conversion of R_{2}C=O to R_{2}C=CH_{2}).

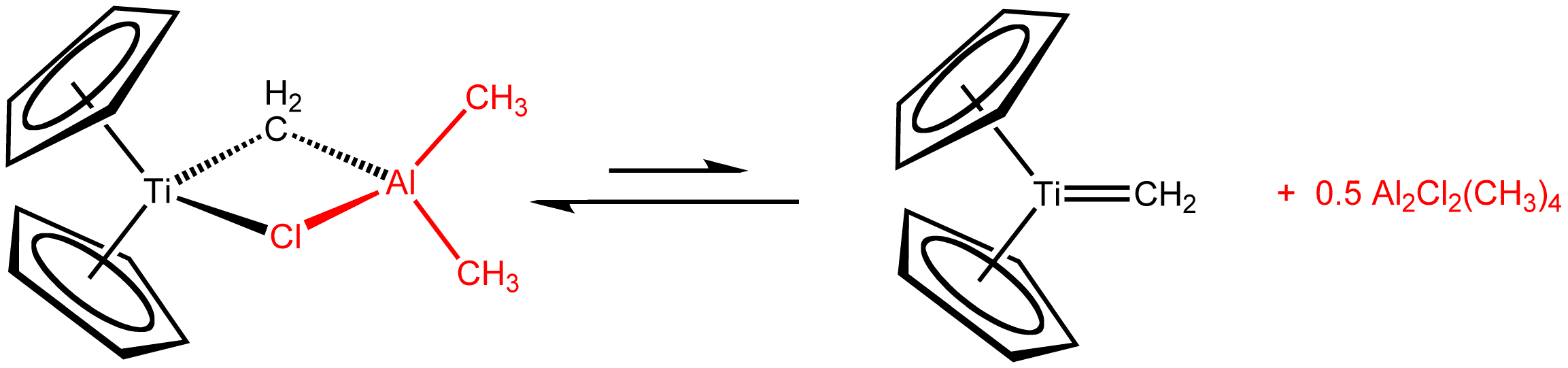

Tebbe's reagent adds simple alkenes to give titanocyclobutanes, which can be regarded as stable olefin metathesis intermediates. These compounds are reagents in itself such as 1,1-bis(cyclopentadienyl)-3,3-dimethyltitanocyclobutane, the adduct of Tebbe's reagent with isobutene catalysed with 4-dimethylaminopyridine.

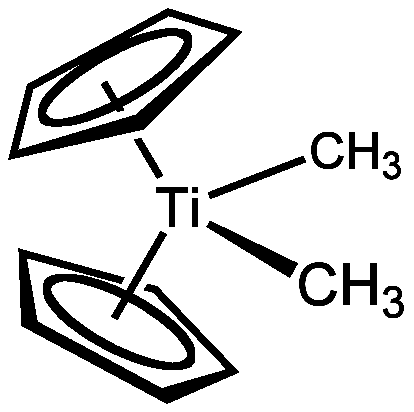
The Petasis reagent, [(η^{5}-Cp)_{2}Ti(CH_{3})_{2}]

The Petasis reagent or dimethyl titanocene (1990) is prepared from titanocene dichloride and methyllithium in diethyl ether. Compared to Tebbe's reagent it is easier to prepare and easier to handle. It is also a methylenation reagent.

The Nugent-RajanBabu reagent is a one-electron reductant used in synthetic organic chemistry for the generation of alcohols via anti-Markovnikov ring-opening of epoxides, and is generated as a dimer [(η^{5}-Cp)_{2}Ti(μ-Cl)]_{2} and used in situ from titanocene dichloride.

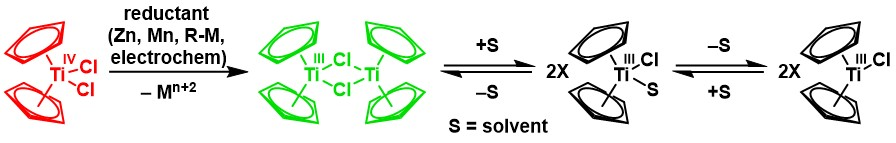

=== Mono-Cp compounds ===
Less useful in organic chemistry but still prominent are many derivatives of (cyclopentadienyl)titanium trichloride, (C_{5}H_{5})TiCl_{3}. This piano-stool complex is obtained by the redistribution reaction of titanocene dichloride and titanium tetrachloride. With an electron count of 12, it is far more electrophilic than the titanocene dichloride with an electron count of 16.

(C_{5}H_{5})TiCl_{3} undergoes reductive carbonylation to [Ti(CO)_{4}Cp]^{−}.

=== Arene complexes ===
Titanium tetrachloride reacts with hexamethylbenzene to give [(η^{6}-C_{6}(CH_{3})_{6})TiCl_{3}]^{+} salts. Reduced arene complexes include the oxidation states −1, 0, +1. In the simplest case, reduction of TiCl_{4} with potassium in benzene gives the deep blue salt KTi(C_{6}H_{6})_{2}.

=== Carbonyl complexes ===
[Ti(CO)_{6}]^{2−} is a rather unstable anion, decomposing in the presence of as weak a Lewis acid as Cs^{+}. Nevertheless, it forms stable salts with noncoordinating cations, such as the alkali metals complexed to crown ethers.
