= Allotropes of sulfur =

Class of substances

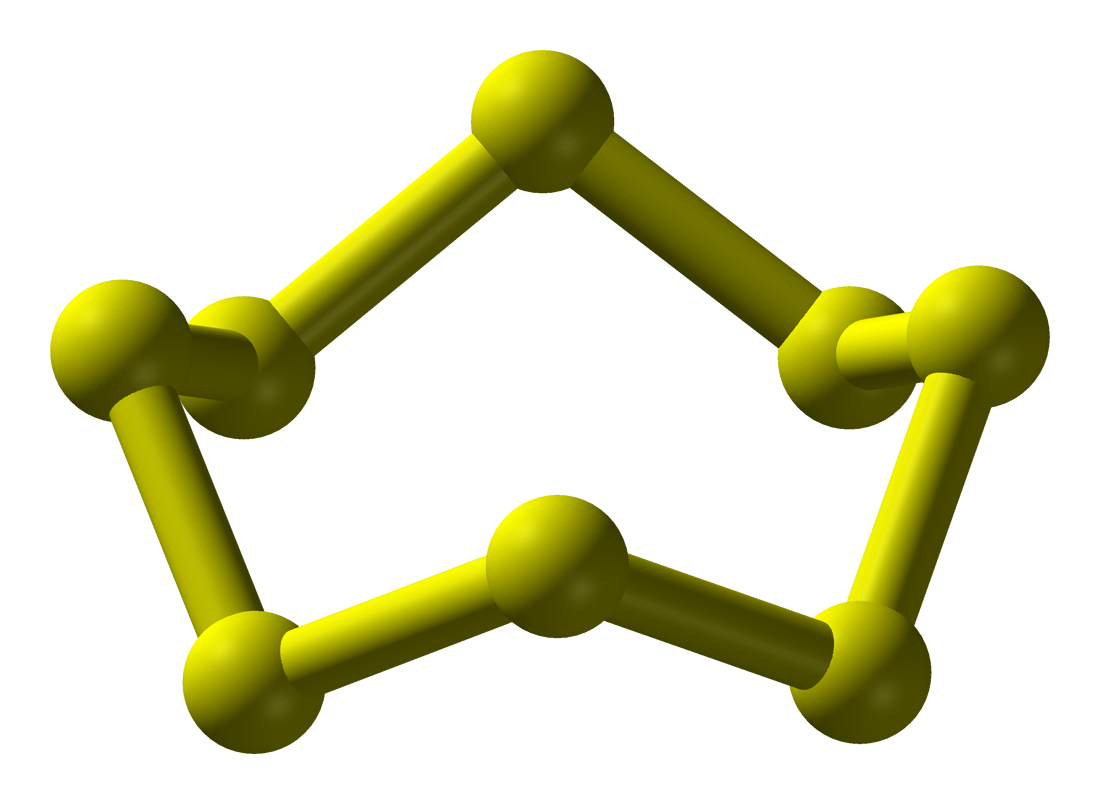
Cyclo-octasulfur (cyclo-S_{8} or cyclooctasulfane), the most prevalent allotrope of sulfur in nature.

The element sulfur exists as many allotropes. In number of allotropes, sulfur is second only to carbon. In addition to the allotropes, each allotrope often exists in polymorphs (different crystal structures of the same covalently bonded S_{n} molecules) delineated by Greek prefixes (α, β, etc.).

Furthermore, because elemental sulfur has been an item of commerce for centuries, its various forms are given traditional names. Early workers identified some forms that have later proved to be single or mixtures of allotropes. Some forms have been named for their appearance, e.g. "mother of pearl sulfur", or alternatively named for a chemist who was pre-eminent in identifying them, e.g. "Muthmann's sulfur I" or "Engel's sulfur".

The most commonly encountered form of sulfur is the orthorhombic polymorph of S_{8}, which adopts a puckered ring – or "crown" – structure. Two other polymorphs are known, also with nearly identical molecular structures. In addition to S_{8}, sulfur rings of 6, 7, 9–15, 18, and 20 atoms are known. At least five allotropes are uniquely formed at high pressures, two of which are metallic.

The number of sulfur allotropes reflects the relatively strong S−S bond of 265 kJ/mol. Furthermore, unlike most elements, the allotropes of sulfur can be manipulated in solutions of organic solvents and are analysed by HPLC.

== Phase diagram ==
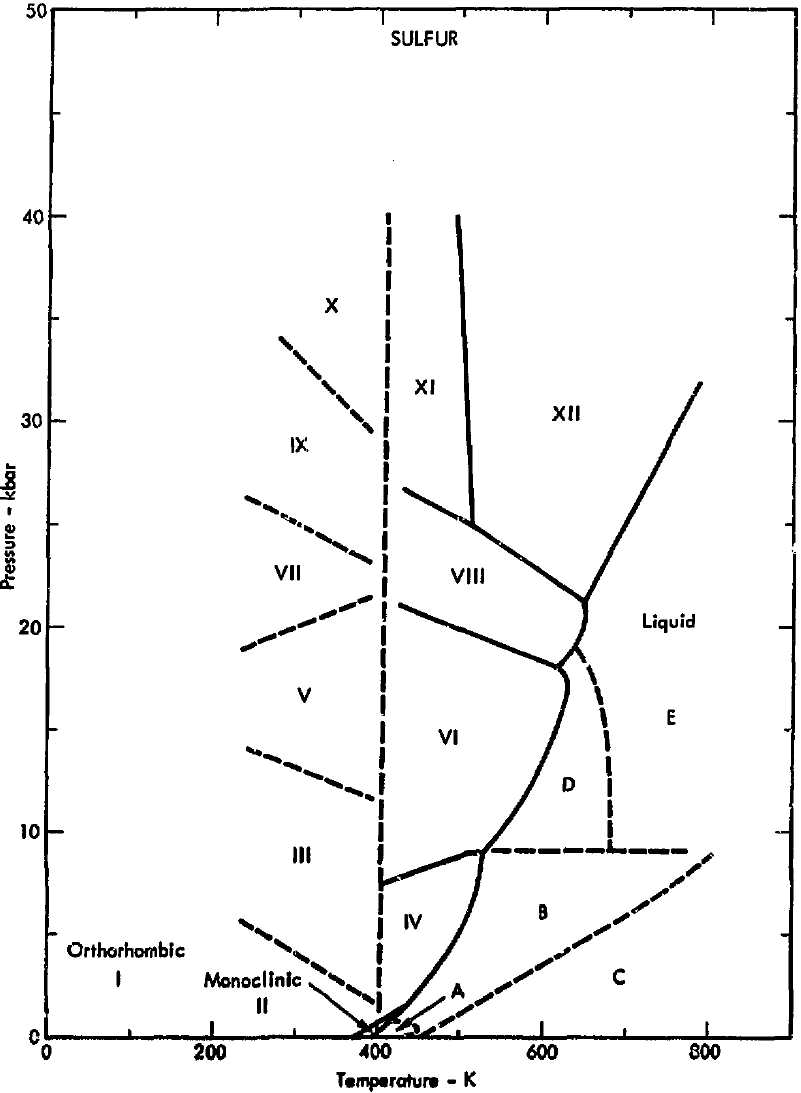
A historic (1975) phase diagram of sulfur. The coordinates are (horizontally) temperature in kelvins (K) and (vertically) pressure in kilobars (kbar). The Roman numerals I-XII refer to known solid phases identified by "volumetric, optical, and electrical resistance techniques," and letters A-E to putative distinct liquid "phases" identified by differential thermal analysis. Phase information is based on the work of G. C. Vezzoli, et al., as reviewed by David Young; as Young notes, "The literature on the allotropy of sulfur presents the most complex and confused situation of all the elements." Phase information are limited to ≤50 kbar and thus omitting metallic phases.

The pressure-temperature (P-T) phase diagram for sulfur is complex (see image). The region labeled I (a solid region), is α-sulfur.

== High-pressure solid allotropes ==
In a high-pressure study at ambient temperatures, four new solid forms, termed II, III, IV, V have been characterized, where α-sulfur is form I. Solid forms II and III are polymeric, while IV and V are metallic (and are superconductive below 10 K and 17 K, respectively). Laser irradiation of solid samples produces three sulfur forms below 200–300 kbar (20–30 GPa).

== Solid cyclo allotrope preparation ==
Two methods exist for the preparation of the cyclo-sulfur allotropes. One of the methods, which is most famous for preparing hexasulfur, is to treat hydrogen polysulfides with polysulfur dichloride:

H_{2}S_{x} + S_{y}Cl_{2} → cyclo-S_{x+y} + 2 HCl

A second strategy uses titanocene pentasulfide as a source of the S^{2−}_{5} unit. This complex is easily made from polysulfide solutions:

[NH_{4}]_{2}S_{5} + (η^{5}-C_{5}H_{5})_{2}TiCl_{2} → (η^{5}-C_{5}H_{5})_{2}TiS_{5} + 2 [NH_{4}]Cl

Titanocene pentasulfide reacts with polysulfur chloride:

(η^{5}-C_{5}H_{5})_{2}TiS_{5} + S_{y}Cl_{2} → cyclo-S_{y+5} + (η^{5}-C_{5}H_{5})_{2}TiCl_{2}

== Solid cyclo-sulfur allotropes ==
=== Cyclo-hexasulfur, cyclo-S_{6} ===
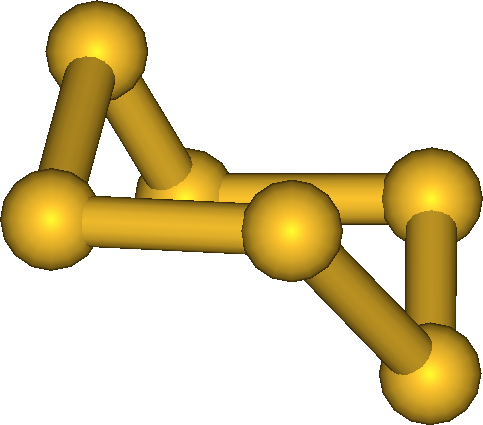
Cyclo-hexasulfur, cyclo-S_{6}

This allotrope was first prepared by M. R. Engel in 1891 by treating thiosulfate with HCl. Cyclo-S_{6} is orange-red and forms a rhombohedral crystal. It is called ρ-sulfur, ε-sulfur, Engel's sulfur and Aten's sulfur. Another method of preparation involves the reaction of a polysulfane with sulfur monochloride:

H_{2}S_{4} + S_{2}Cl_{2} → cyclo-S_{6} + 2 HCl (dilute solution in diethyl ether)

The sulfur ring in cyclo-S_{6} has a "chair" conformation, reminiscent of the chair form of cyclohexane. All of the sulfur atoms are equivalent.

=== Cyclo-heptasulfur, cyclo-S_{7} ===
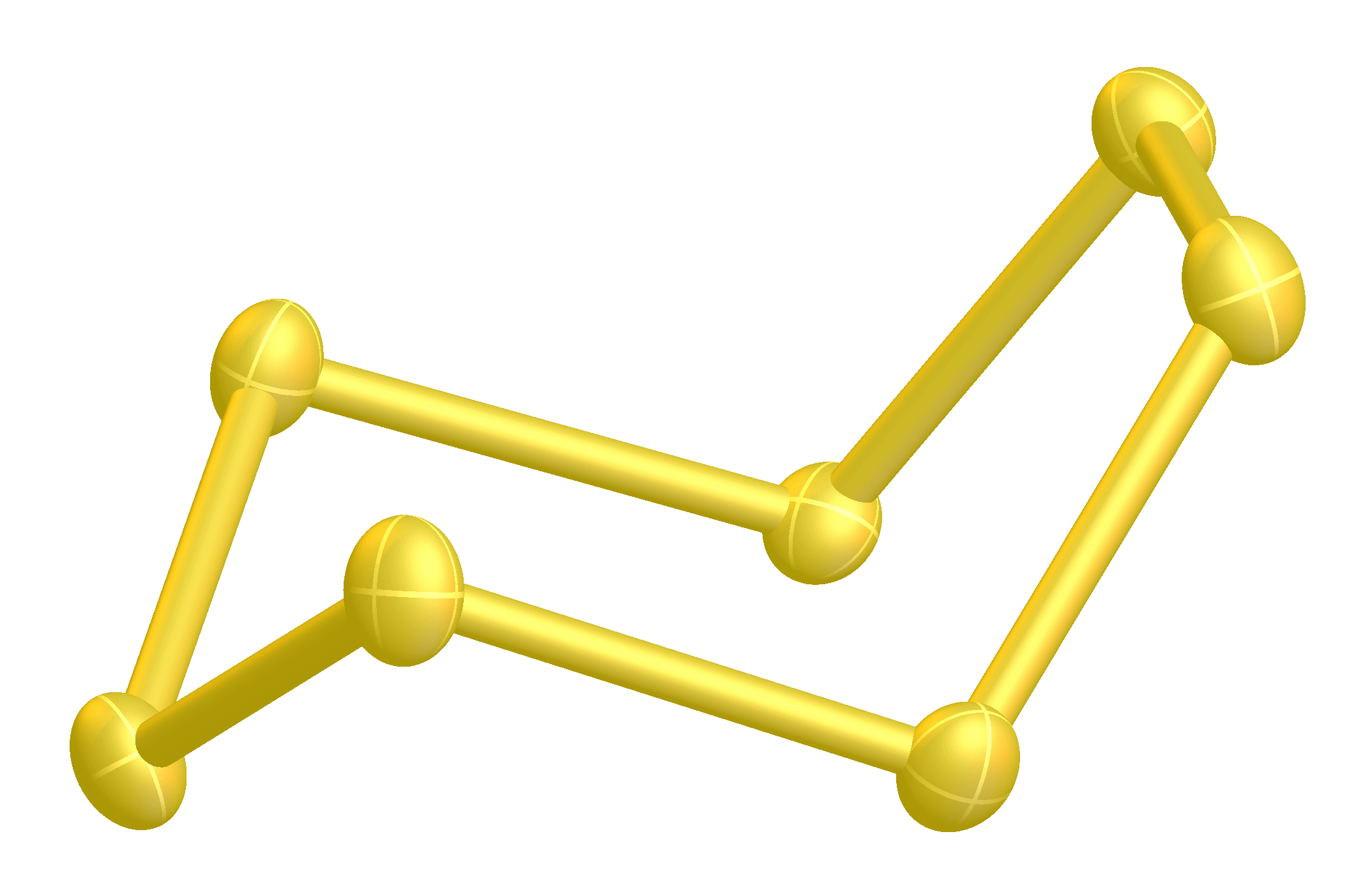
Structure of cyclo-S_{7}.

It is a bright yellow solid. Four (α-, β-, γ-, δ-) forms of cyclo-heptasulfur are known. Two forms (γ-, δ-) have been characterized. The cyclo-S_{7} ring has an unusual range of bond lengths of 199.3–218.1 pm. It is said to be the least stable of all of the sulfur allotropes.

=== Cyclo-octasulfur, cyclo-S_{8} ===
Octasulfur contains puckered S_{8} rings, and is known in three forms that differ only in the way the rings are packed in the crystal.

==== α-Sulfur ====
α-Sulfur is the form most commonly found in nature. When pure it has a greenish-yellow colour (traces of cyclo-S_{7} in commercially available samples make it appear yellower). It is practically insoluble in water and is a good electrical insulator with poor thermal conductivity. It is quite soluble in carbon disulfide: 35.5 g/100 g solvent at 25 °C. It has an orthorhombic crystal structure. α-Sulfur is the predominant form found in "flowers of sulfur", "roll sulfur" and "milk of sulfur". It contains S_{8} puckered rings, alternatively called a crown shape. The S–S bond lengths are all 203.7 pm and the S-S-S angles are 107.8° with a dihedral angle of 98°. At 95.3 °C, α-sulfur converts to β-sulfur.

==== β-Sulfur ====
β-Sulfur is a yellow solid with a monoclinic crystal form and is less dense than α-sulfur. It is unusual because it is only stable above 95.3 °C; below this temperature it converts to α-sulfur. β-Sulfur can be prepared by crystallising at 100 °C and cooling rapidly to slow down formation of α-sulfur. It has a melting point variously quoted as 119.6 °C and 119.8 °C but as it decomposes to other forms at around this temperature the observed melting point can vary. The 119 °C melting point has been termed the "ideal melting point" and the typical lower value (114.5 °C) when decomposition occurs, the "natural melting point".

==== γ-Sulfur ====
γ-Sulfur was first prepared by F.W. Muthmann in 1890. It is sometimes called "nacreous sulfur" or "mother of pearl sulfur" because of its appearance. It crystallises in pale yellow monoclinic needles. It is the densest form of the three. It can be prepared by slowly cooling molten sulfur that has been heated above 150 °C or by chilling solutions of sulfur in carbon disulfide, ethyl alcohol or hydrocarbons. It is found in nature as the mineral rosickyite. It has been tested in carbon fiber-stabilized form as a cathode in lithium-sulfur (Li-S) batteries and was observed to stop the formation of polysulfides that compromise battery life.

=== Cyclo-S_{n} (n = 9–15, 18, 20) ===
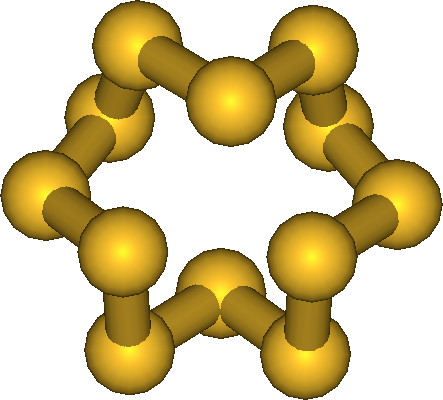
Cyclo-dodecasulfur, cyclo-S_{12}

These allotropes have been synthesised by various methods for example, treating titanocene pentasulfide and a dichlorosulfane of suitable sulfur chain length, S_{n−5}Cl_{2}:

(η^{5}-C_{5}H_{5})_{2}TiS_{5} + S_{n−5}Cl_{2} → cyclo-S_{n} + (η^{5}-C_{5}H_{5})_{2}TiCl_{2}

or alternatively treating a dichlorosulfane, S_{n−m}Cl_{2} and a polysulfane, H_{2}S_{m}:

S_{n−m}Cl_{2} + H_{2}S_{m} → cyclo-S_{n} + 2 HCl

S_{12}, S_{18}, and S_{20} can also be prepared from S_{8}. With the exception of cyclo-S_{12}, the rings contain S–S bond lengths and S-S-S bond angle that differ one from another.

Cyclo-S_{12} is the most stable cyclo-allotrope other than S_{8}. Its structure can be visualised as having sulfur atoms in three parallel planes, 3 in the top, 6 in the middle and three in the bottom.

Two forms (α-, β-) of cyclo-S_{9} are known, one of which has been characterized.

Two forms of cyclo-S_{18} are known where the conformation of the ring is different. To differentiate these structures, rather than using the normal crystallographic convention of α-, β-, etc., which in other cyclo-S_{n} compounds refer to different packings of essentially the same conformer, these two conformers have been termed endo- and exo-.

=== Cyclo-S_{6}·cyclo-S_{10} adduct ===
This adduct is produced from a solution of cyclo-S_{6} and cyclo-S_{10} in CS_{2}. It has a density midway between cyclo-S_{6} and cyclo-S_{10}. The crystal consists of alternate layers of cyclo-S_{6} and cyclo-S_{10}. This material is a rare example of an allotrope that contains molecules of different sizes.

== Catena sulfur forms ==
The term "Catena sulfur forms" refers to mixtures of sulfur allotropes that are high in catena (polymer chain) sulfur. The naming of the different forms is very confusing and care has to be taken to determine what is being described because some names are used interchangeably.

=== Amorphous sulfur ===
Amorphous sulfur is the quenched product from molten sulfur hotter than the λ-transition at 160 °C, where polymerization yields catena sulfur molecules. (Above this temperature, the properties of the liquid melt change remarkably. For example, the viscosity increases more than 10000-fold as the temperature increases through the transition). As it anneals, solid amorphous sulfur changes from its initial glassy form, to a plastic form, hence its other names of plastic, and glassy or vitreous sulfur. The plastic form is also called χ-sulfur. Amorphous sulfur contains a complex mixture of catena-sulfur forms mixed with cyclo-forms.

=== Insoluble sulfur ===
Insoluble sulfur is obtained by washing quenched liquid sulfur with CS_{2}. It is sometimes called polymeric sulfur, μ-S or ω-S.

=== Fibrous (φ-) sulfur ===
Fibrous (φ-) sulfur is a mixture of the allotropic ψ- form and γ-cyclo-S_{8}.

=== ω-Sulfur ===
ω-Sulfur is a commercially available product prepared from amorphous sulfur that has not been stretched prior to extraction of soluble forms with CS_{2}. It sometimes called "white sulfur of Das" or supersublimated sulfur. It is a mixture of ψ-sulfur and lamina sulfur. The composition depends on the exact method of production and the sample's history. One well known commercial form is "Crystex". ω-sulfur is used in the vulcanization of rubber.

=== λ-Sulfur ===
λ-Sulfur is molten sulfur just above the melting temperature. It is a mixture containing mostly cyclo-S_{8}. Cooling λ-sulfur slowly gives predominantly β-sulfur.

=== μ-Sulfur ===
μ-Sulfur is the name applied to solid insoluble sulfur and the melt prior to quenching.

=== π-Sulfur ===
π-Sulfur is a dark-coloured liquid formed when λ-sulfur is left to stay molten. It contains mixture of S_{n} rings.

=== Biradical catena (S_{∞}) chains ===
This term is applied to biradical catena-chains in sulfur melts or the chains in the solid.

=== Solid catena allotropes ===
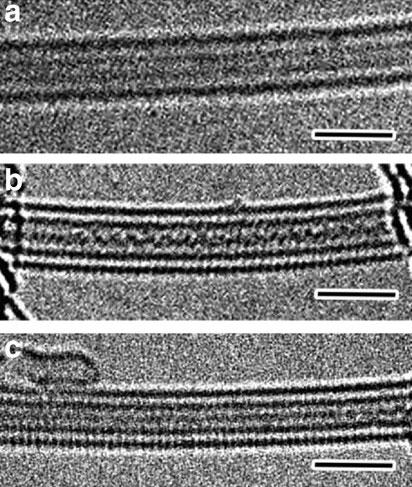
Two parallel monatomic sulfur chains grown inside a single-wall carbon nanotube (CNT, a) Zig-zag (b) and straight (c) S chains inside double-wall CNTs.

The production of pure forms of catena-sulfur has proved to be extremely difficult. Complicating factors include the purity of the starting material and the thermal history of the sample.

==== ψ-Sulfur ====
This form, also called fibrous sulfur or ω1-sulfur, has been well characterized. It has a density of 2.01 g·cm^{−3} (α-sulfur 2.069 g·cm^{−3}) and decomposes around its melting point of 104 °C. It consists of parallel helical sulfur chains. These chains have both left and right-handed "twists" and a radius of 95 pm. The S–S bond length is 206.6 pm, the S-S-S bond angle is 106° and the dihedral angle is 85.3°, (comparable figures for α-sulfur are 203.7 pm, 107.8° and 98.3°).

==== Lamina sulfur ====
Lamina sulfur has not been well characterized but is believed to consist of criss-crossed helices. It is also called χ-sulfur or ω2-sulfur.

== High-temperature gaseous allotropes ==
Monatomic sulfur can be produced from photolysis of carbonyl sulfide.

=== Disulfur, S_{2} ===
Disulfur, S_{2}, is the predominant species in sulfur vapour above 720 °C (a temperature above that shown in the phase diagram); at low pressure (1 mmHg) at 530 °C, it comprises 99% of the vapor. It is a triplet diradical (like dioxygen and sulfur monoxide), with an S=S bond length of 188.7 pm. The blue colour of burning sulfur is due to the emission of light by the S_{2} molecule produced in the flame.

The S_{2} molecule has been trapped in the compound [S_{2}I_{4}]^{2+}([EF_{6}]^{−})_{2} (E = As, Sb) for crystallographic measurements, produced by treating elemental sulfur with excess iodine in liquid sulfur dioxide. The [S_{2}I_{4}]^{2+} cation has an "open-book" structure, in which each [I_{2}]^{+} ion donates the unpaired electron in the π^{*} molecular orbital to a vacant orbital of the S_{2} molecule.

=== Trisulfur, S_{3} ===
S_{3} is found in sulfur vapour, comprising 10% of vapour species at 440 °C and 10 mmHg. It is cherry red in colour, with a bent structure, similar to ozone, O_{3}.

=== Tetrasulfur, S_{4} ===
S_{4} has been detected in the vapour phase, but it has not been well characterized. Diverse structures (e.g. chains, branched chains and rings) have been proposed.

Theoretical calculations suggest a cyclic structure.

=== Pentasulfur, S_{5} ===
Pentasulfur has been detected in sulfur vapours but has not been isolated in pure form.

== List of allotropes and forms ==
Allotropes are in Bold.

Formula/name	Common name	Other names	Notes
**S_{2}**	disulfur		A diatomic gas with a triplet ground state like dioxygen.
**S_{3}**	trisulfur		A cherry red triatomic gas with a bent ozone-like structure.
**S_{4}**	tetrasulfur		Structure not determined but calculations indicate it to be cyclo-S_{4}.
cyclo-S_{5}	cyclo-pentasulfur		Not yet isolated, only detected in sulfur vapour.
cyclo-S_{6}	**ρ-sulfur**	cyclo-hexasulfur, "ε-sulfur", "Engel's" sulfur, "Aten's sulfur"	The ring adopts a chair form in the solid.
**cyclo-S_{6}·cyclo-S_{10} adduct**			A mixed crystal with alternating layers of cyclo-S_{6} and cyclo-S_{10}.
cyclo-S_{7}	**α-, β-, γ-, δ- cycloheptasulfur**		Four forms known, two(γ-, δ- ) characterized.
cyclo-S_{8}	**α-sulfur**	"orthorhombic sulfur" "rhombic sulfur", "flowers of sulfur", "roll sulfur" "milk of sulfur", "Muthmann's sulfur I"	Yellow solid consisting of S_{8} puckered rings. The thermodynamically stable form at ordinary temperatures.
cyclo-S_{8}	**β-sulfur**	"monoclinic sulfur" "prismatic sulfur" "Muthmann's sulfur II"	Yellow crystalline solid, consisting of S_{8} puckered rings. Only stable above 95.3 °C, it reverts to α-sulfur at room temperature.
cyclo-S_{8}	**γ-sulfur**	"nacreous sulfur" "mother of pearl sulfur" "Gernez's sulfur" or "Muthmann's sulfur III".	Light yellow solid, crystal monoclinic, consisting of S_{8} puckered rings. Found in nature as the rare mineral rosickyite.
**cyclo-S_{n}** **n = 9–15, 18, 20**	cyclo-(nona; deca; undeca; dodeca; trideca; tetradeca; pentadeca; octadeca; eicosa)sulfur		Pure forms all allotropes, cyclo-S_{9} has four forms, cyclo-S_{18} has two forms. Generally synthesised rather than obtained by treatment of another form of elemental sulfur.
catena-S_{x}	**fibrous (ψ) sulfur**		Well characterized, contains parallel helical sulfur chains and is difficult to obtain pure.
catena-S_{x}	**lamina sulfur**		Not well characterized, contains helical chains partially crossed.
	amorphous sulfur	"plastic sulfur"	Quenched molten sulfur at first solidifies to amorphous or glassy sulfur. Consists of a mixture of catena sulfur and cyclo sulfur.
	insoluble sulfur		Quenched liquid sulfur with soluble species extracted with CS_{2}. Sometimes called polymeric sulfur, μ-S or ω-S.
	φ-sulfur		A mixture of allotropic ψ-sulfur and cyclo forms mainly γ-cyclo-S_{8}.
	ω-sulfur	insoluble sulfur	A mixture of chains with a minimum of soluble species.
	λ-sulfur		Light yellow mobile liquid formed when β-sulfur first melts at 119.6 °C. Consists of S_{8} rings.
	μ-sulfur		The dark-coloured viscous liquid formed when π-sulfur is heated and the solid when cooled. Contains a mixture of polymeric chains.
	π-sulfur		Dark-coloured liquid that develops as λ-sulfur is left molten. Contains mixture of S_{n} rings.
High-pressure forms of α-sulfur	S-II, S-III, S-IV, S-V and others		Four high-pressure phases (at ambient temperature) including two that are metallic and become superconducting at low temperature and some additional phases photo-induced below 20–30 GPa.

== Bibliography ==
- Greenwood, Norman N.; Earnshaw, Alan (1997). Chemistry of the Elements (2nd ed.). Butterworth-Heinemann. ISBN 0-08-037941-9.
- Steudel, R., ed. (2004). Elemental sulfur and sulfur-rich compounds I (Topics in current chemistry). Springer. ISBN 3-540-40191-1.
