= Titanocene Y =

Organotitanium compound

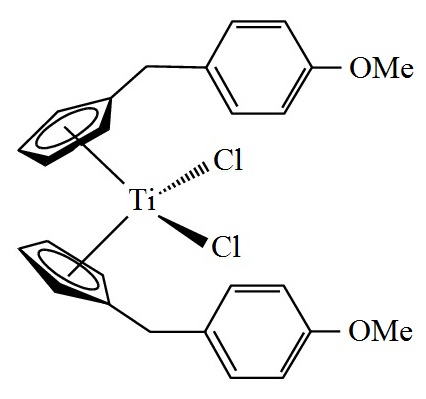
Structure of Titanocene Y

Titanocene Y also known as bis[(p-methoxybenzyl)cyclopentadienyl]titanium(IV) dichloride or dichloridobis(η^{5}-(p-methoxybenzyl)cyclopentadienyl)titanium is an organotitanium compound that has been investigated for use as an anticancer drug.

== Discovery ==
Titanocene dichloride is known to be a potential anticancer drug since the late 1970s. After initial clinical trials against breast and renal-cell cancer were performed with this compound, the search for improved derivatives started. Particularly, lipophilic titanocene dichloride derivatives derived from fulvenes were synthesised in structural diversity and this led to the development of bis[(p-methoxybenzyl)cyclopentadienyl]titanium(IV) dichloride, which became better known in the literature under its trivial name of Titanocene Y.

== Mechanism of action ==
Titanocene Y is a cytotoxic apoptosis-inducing and anti-angiogenic drug candidate targeting renal-cell cancer and other solid tumors. The compound is transported via serum albumin selectively into cancer cells and targets their DNA by coordinating strongly to phosphate groups. Additionally, Titanocene Y is able to induce apoptosis via the FAS receptor pathway. Very encouraging is the fact that Titanocene Y is breaking platinum-resistance in human colon and human lung cancer cells, which might make it attractive as a cytotoxic component of future 2nd or 3rd line cancer treatments.

== Animal testing ==
Titanocene Y was tested extensively in vivo; it showed promising results against xenografted human epidermoid carcinoma and prostate cancer, while best results are reached against breast and renal-cell cancer. Titanocene Y can be given in the mouse in high dosages and it shows generally mild toxicity in the form of diarrhea. Titanocene Y is not patent protected and would therefore benefit from non-commercial sponsoring to develop it into a cytotoxic drug candidate for the treatment of advanced renal-cell cancer – an area in need of better therapies.
