= Nysted reagent =

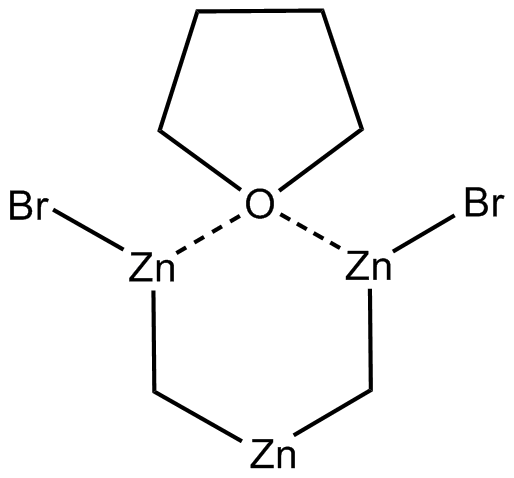
- Structural formula of the Nysted reagent

Names
- IUPAC name cyclo-Dibromodi-μ-methylene[μ-(tetrahydrofuran)]trizinc

Identifiers
CAS Number	41114-59-4
3D model (JSmol)	Interactive image
ChemSpider	21171210
- InChI: InChI=1S/C4H8O.2CH2.2BrH.3Zn/c1-2-4-5-3-1;;;;;;;/h1-4H2;2*1H2;2*1H;;;/q;;;;;;2*+1/p-2 Key: CCTHTLJWXPUNGT-UHFFFAOYSA-L; InChI=1/C4H8O.2CH2.2BrH.3Zn/c1-2-4-5-3-1;;;;;;;/h1-4H2;2*1H2;2*1H;;;/q;;;;;;2*+1/p-2/rC4H8O.C2H4Br2Zn3/c1-2-4-5-3-1;3-6-1-5-2-7-4/h1-4H2;1-2H2 Key: CCTHTLJWXPUNGT-LIIURCMFAD
- SMILES: Br[Zn]C[Zn]C[Zn]Br.C1CCCO1

Properties
Chemical formula	C_{6}H_{12}Br_{2}OZn_{3}
Molar mass	456.14 g/mol

Hazards
- Occupational safety and health (OHS/OSH)
Main hazards	Flammable, may form explosive peroxides and reacts violently with water
Flash point	−26.0 °C (−14.8 °F; 247.2 K)
Safety data sheet (SDS)	External MSDS
- Except where otherwise noted, data are given for materials in their standard state (at 25 °C [77 °F], 100 kPa). verify (what is ?) Infobox references

The Nysted reagent is a reagent used in organic synthesis for the methylenation of a carbonyl group. It was discovered in 1975 by Leonard N. Nysted in Chicago, Illinois. It was originally prepared by reacting dibromomethane and activated zinc in THF. A proposed mechanism for the methenylation reaction runs as follows:

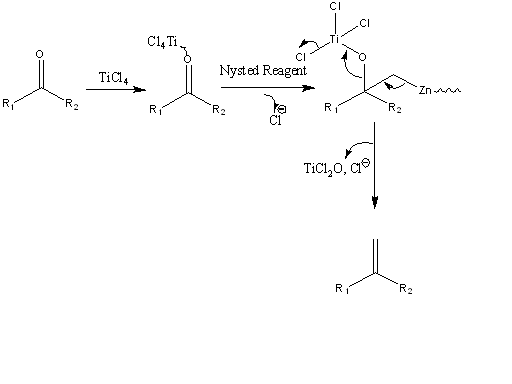
A proposed mechanism for the Nysted olefination

A similar reagent is Tebbe's reagent. In the Nysted olefination, the Nysted reagent reacts with TiCl_{4} to methylenate a carbonyl group. The biggest problem with these reagents are that the reactivity has not been well documented. It is believed that the TiCl_{4} acts as a mediator in the reaction. Nysted reagent can methylenate different carbonyl groups in the presence of different mediators. For example, in the presence of BF_{3}•OEt_{2}, the reagent will methylenate aldehydes. On the other hand, in the presence of TiCl_{4}, TiCl_{3} or TiCl_{2} and BF_{3}•OEt_{2}, the reagent can methylenate ketones. Most commonly, it is used to methylenate ketones because of their general difficulty to methylenate due to crowding around the carbonyl group. The Nysted reagent is able to overcome the additional steric hindrance found in ketones, and more easily methylenate the carbonyl group. In contrast to the Wittig reaction the neutral reaction conditions of the Nysted reagent make it a useful alternative for the methylenation of easily enolizable ketones.

There is little research on Nysted reagent because of the hazards and high reactivity and the difficulty of keeping the reagent stable while it is in use. More specifically, it can form explosive peroxides when exposed to air and is extremely flammable. Also, it reacts violently with water. These make this reagent very dangerous to work with.

== See also ==
- Petasis reagent
- Titanium–zinc methylenation
