= Methylenation =

Chemical reaction which adds a –CH2– group to a molecule

In organic chemistry, methylenation is a chemical reaction that inserts a methylene (−CH_{2}−) group into a chemical compound:

$$\ce{A-B} \longrightarrow \ce{A}{\color{red}\ce{-CH2 -}}\ce{B}$$

In a related sense, it also describes a process in which a divalent group of a starting material is removed and replaced with a terminal CH_{2} group:

$$\ce{A=E} \longrightarrow \ce{A}{\color{red}\ce{=CH2}}$$

Methylenation in this context is also known as methenylation. Most commonly, E is an oxygen atom, so that the reaction results in terminal alkenes from aldehydes and ketones, or more rarely, enol ethers from esters or enamines from amides.

== Methods ==
=== Methylene Insertion into Alkanes ===
Singlet methylene (^{1}[:CH_{2}]), produced from photolysis of diazomethane under ultraviolet irradiation, methylenates hydrocarbons. Arenes and olefins undergo methylenation to give cyclopropanated products. In the case of arenes, the cyclopropanation product undergoes further electrocyclic ring opening to give cycloheptatriene products (Buchner ring expansion). Alkenes undergo both C=C methylenation and C–H methylenation insertion to give a mixture of cyclopropanation and homologation products.

Reflecting the exceptionally high reactivity of singlet methylene, normally unreactive alkanes undergo methylenation to give homologation products, even at –75 °C.

$$\ce{R-H} + {\color{red}\ce{CH2}}\longrightarrow \ce{R}{\color{red}\ce{-CH2}}\ce{H}$$

Photolysis of a solution of diazomethane in n-pentane gives a mixture of hexanes and higher homologues. At –75 °C, the product ratio is 48:35:17 mixture of n-hexane, 2-methylpentane, and 3-methylpentane. The ratio is remarkably close to the statistical product ratio of 6:4:2 (~50:33:17) based on the number of available C–H bonds at each position that could undergo methylene insertion. As a result, Doering and coworkers concluded:

Methylene must be classed as the most indiscriminate reagent known in organic chemistry.

=== Methylene-for-oxo reactions ===
A common method for methylenation involves the Wittig reaction using methylenetriphenylphosphorane with an aldehyde (Ph = phenyl, C_{6}H_{5}):

$$\ce{RCHO + Ph3P=CH2 -> RCH=CH2 + Ph3PO}$$

A related reaction can be accomplished with Tebbe's reagent, which is sufficiently versatile to allow methylenation of esters:

$$\ce{RCO2R' + Cp2Ti(Cl)CH2AlMe2 -> RC(OR')=CH2 + Cp2TiOAlMe2Cl}$$

Other less well-defined titanium reagents, e.g., Lombardo's reagent, effect similar transformations.

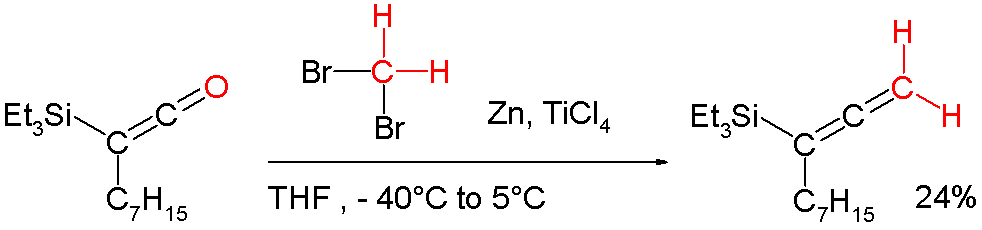

Carbanions derived from methylsulfones have also been employed, equivalently to the Wittig reaction.

=== Methylenation adjacent to carbonyl groups ===
Ketones and esters can be methylenated at the α position to give α,β-unsaturated carbonyl products containing an additional terminal CH_{2} group in a three-step process known as the Eschenmoser methylenation. An enolate is generated by deprotonation of the α-C–H bond using a hindered lithium amide (LiNR_{2}) base (e.g., LDA, LHMDS). Subsequently, the enolate is reacted with Eschenmoser's salt ([Me_{2}N=CH_{2}]^{+}I^{–}) to give a β-dimethylamino carbonyl compound (Mannich base). The Mannich base is then subjected to methylation or N-oxidation to give a trimethylammonium salt or amine N-oxide, which is then subjected to Hofmann elimination or Cope elimination, respectively to give the α-methylene carbonyl compound. If the Hofmann elimination is used, the process can be represented as follows:

$$\ce{RC(=O)CH2R' -> RC(=O) CH(CH2NMe2)R' -> [RC(=O) CH(CH2NMe3)R']+I- -> RC(=O) C(=CH2)(R')}$$

=== Other approaches ===
Ethenolysis is a method for methylenation of internal alkene as illustrated by the following example:

$$\ce{RCH=CHR} + {\color{red}\ce{CH2=CH2}} \longrightarrow \ce{2 RCH=}{\color{red}\ce{CH2}}$$

In principle, the addition of CH_{2} across a C=C double bond could be classified as a methylenation, but such transformations are commonly described as cyclopropanations.
