= Petasis reagent =

- Structural formula of the Petasis reagent

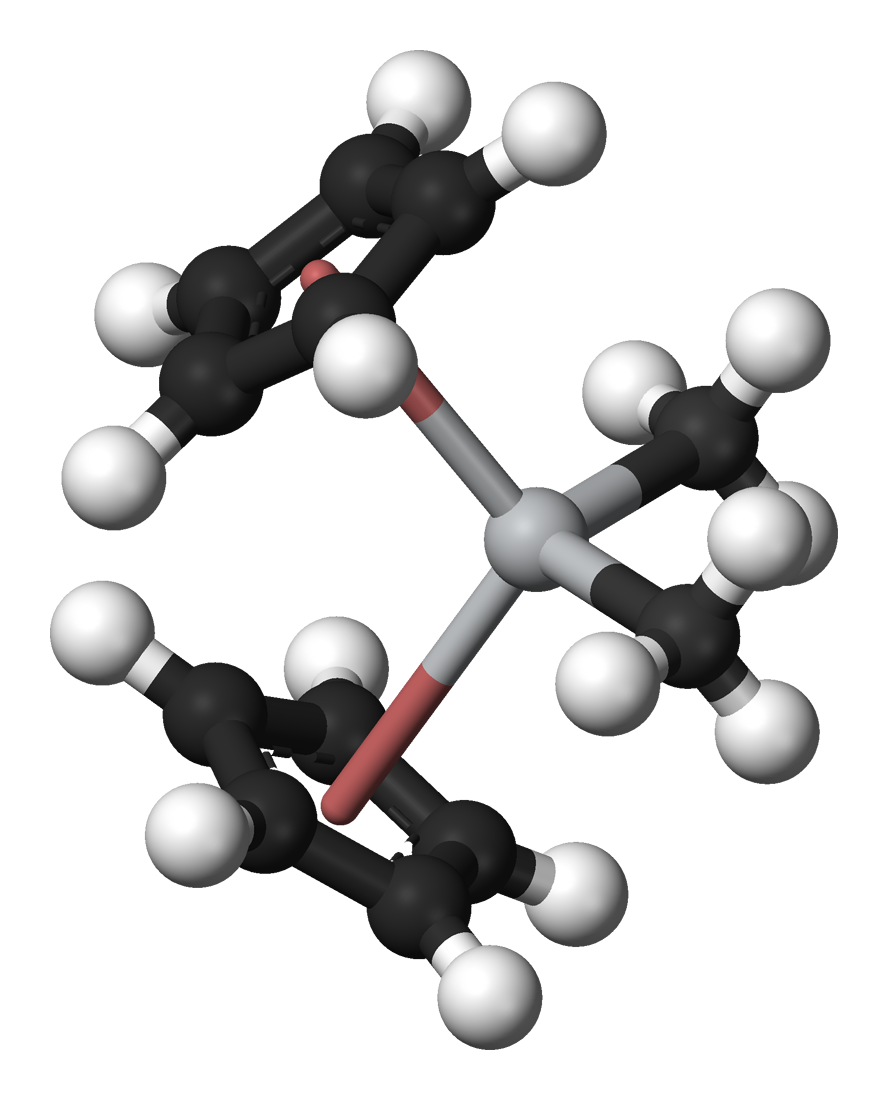
- Ball-and-stick model of the Petasis reagent

Names
- IUPAC name Bis(η^{5}-cyclopentadienyl)dimethyltitanium
- Other names Dimethyltitanocene

Identifiers
CAS Number	1271-66-5
3D model (JSmol)	Interactive image
ChemSpider	34981143
ECHA InfoCard	100.204.841
EC Number	679-889-8
PubChem CID	71308256
- InChI: InChI=1S/2C5H5.2CH3.Ti/c2*1-2-4-5-3-1;;;/h2*1-5H;2*1H3;/q2*-1;;;+2 Key: AFEQRLILWYRIDQ-UHFFFAOYSA-N; InChI=1/2C5H5.2CH3.Ti/c2*1-2-4-5-3-1;;;/h2*1-5H;2*1H3;/q2*-1;;;+2/r2C5H5.C2H6Ti/c2*1-2-4-5-3-1;1-3-2/h2*1-5H;1-2H3/q2*-1;+2 Key: AFEQRLILWYRIDQ-MEMJIDHRAL
- SMILES: [Ti](C)(C).c1[cH-]ccc1.c2[cH-]ccc2

Properties
Chemical formula	C_{12}H_{16}Ti
Molar mass	208.13 g/mol

Hazards
- Occupational safety and health (OHS/OSH)
Main hazards	Irritant, incompatible with water and oxidizing agents
- GHS labelling
Pictograms	(GHS02: Flammable) (GHS07: Exclamation mark) (GHS08: Health hazard)
Signal word	Danger
Hazard statements	H225, H304, H315, H319, H332, H360, H370, H372
- Except where otherwise noted, data are given for materials in their standard state (at 25 °C [77 °F], 100 kPa). verify (what is ?) Infobox references

The Petasis reagent, named after Nicos A. Petasis, is an organotitanium compound with the formula Cp_{2}Ti(CH_{3})_{2}. It is an orange-colored solid.

== Preparation and use ==
The Petasis reagent is prepared by the salt metathesis reaction of methylmagnesium chloride or methyllithium with titanocene dichloride:

Cp_{2}TiCl_{2} + 2 CH_{3}MgCl → Cp_{2}Ti(CH_{3})_{2} + 2 MgCl_{2}

This compound is used for the transformation of carbonyl groups to terminal alkenes. It exhibits similar reactivity to the Tebbe reagent and Wittig reaction. Unlike the Wittig reaction, the Petasis reagent can react with a wide range of aldehydes, ketones and esters. The Petasis reagent is also very air stable, and is commonly used in solution with toluene or THF.

The Tebbe reagent and the Petasis reagent share a similar reaction mechanism. The active olefinating reagent, Cp_{2}TiCH_{2}, is generated in situ upon heating. With the organic carbonyl, this titanium carbene forms a four membered oxatitanacyclobutane that releases the terminal alkene.

In contrast to the Tebbe reagent, homologs of the Petasis reagent are relatively easy to prepare by using the corresponding alkyllithium instead of methyllithium, allowing the conversion of carbonyl groups to alkylidenes.

== See also ==
- Nysted reagent
- Titanium–zinc methylenation
