= Rosickýite =

Native element mineral

Rosickyite
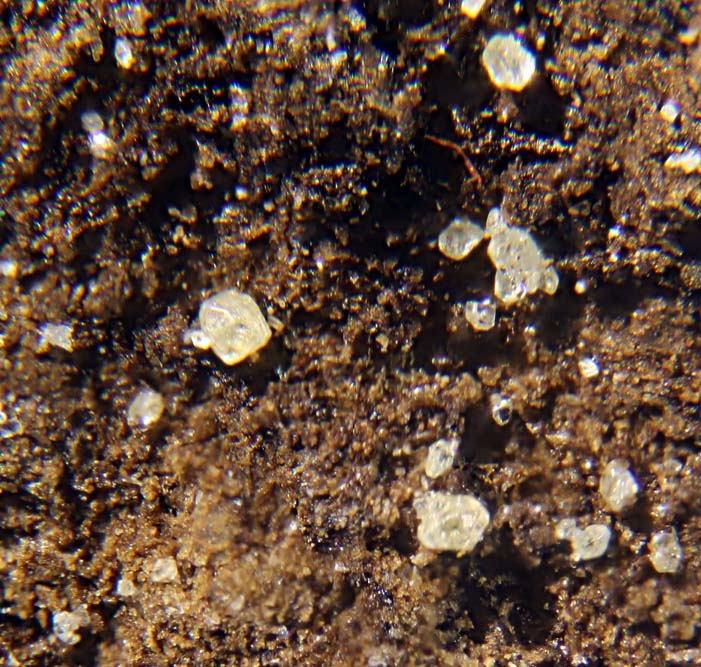
- Sharp yellow crystals of rosickyite on matrix from an unspecified off shore drill hole in the Pacific Ocean near California (Ventura County, California, United States of America).

General
- Category: Native element mineral
- Formula: S
- IMA symbol: Rký
- Strunz classification: 1.CC.05
- Crystal system: Monoclinic
- Crystal class: Prismatic (2/m) (same H-M symbol)
- Space group: P2/c
- Unit cell: a = 8.455(3) Å, b = 13.052(2) Å c = 9.267(3) Å; β = 124.89(3)°; Z = 4

Identification
- Color: Colorless to pale yellow, green tinge
- Crystal habit: Equidimensional to thin tabular crystals, efflorescences
- Twinning: On {101}, with twin lamellae parallel to [010]
- Cleavage: None
- Mohs scale hardness: 2 - 3
- Luster: Adamantine
- Diaphaneity: Transparent to translucent
- Specific gravity: 2.07
- Optical properties: Biaxial (-)

Rosickyite is a rare native element mineral that is a polymorph of sulfur. It crystallizes in the monoclinic crystal system and is a high temperature, high density polymorph. It occurs as soft, colorless to pale yellow crystals and efflorescences.

It was first described in 1930 for an occurrence in Havirna, near Letovice, Moravia, Czech Republic. It was named for Vojtĕch Rosický (1880–1942), of Masaryk University, Brno.

Rosickyite occurs as in Death Valley within an evaporite layer produced by a microbial community. The otherwise unstable polymorph was produced and stabilized within a cyanobacteria dominated layer.
