= Titanocene dichloride =

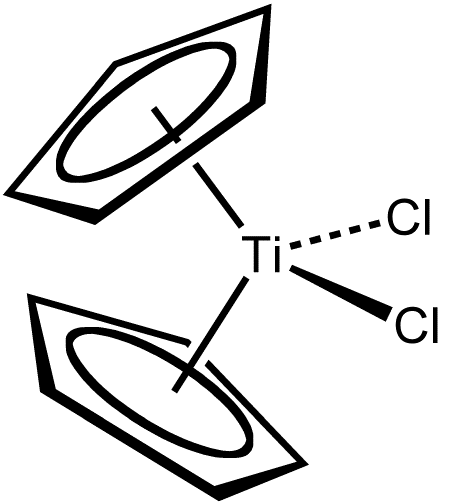
- Titanocene dichloride

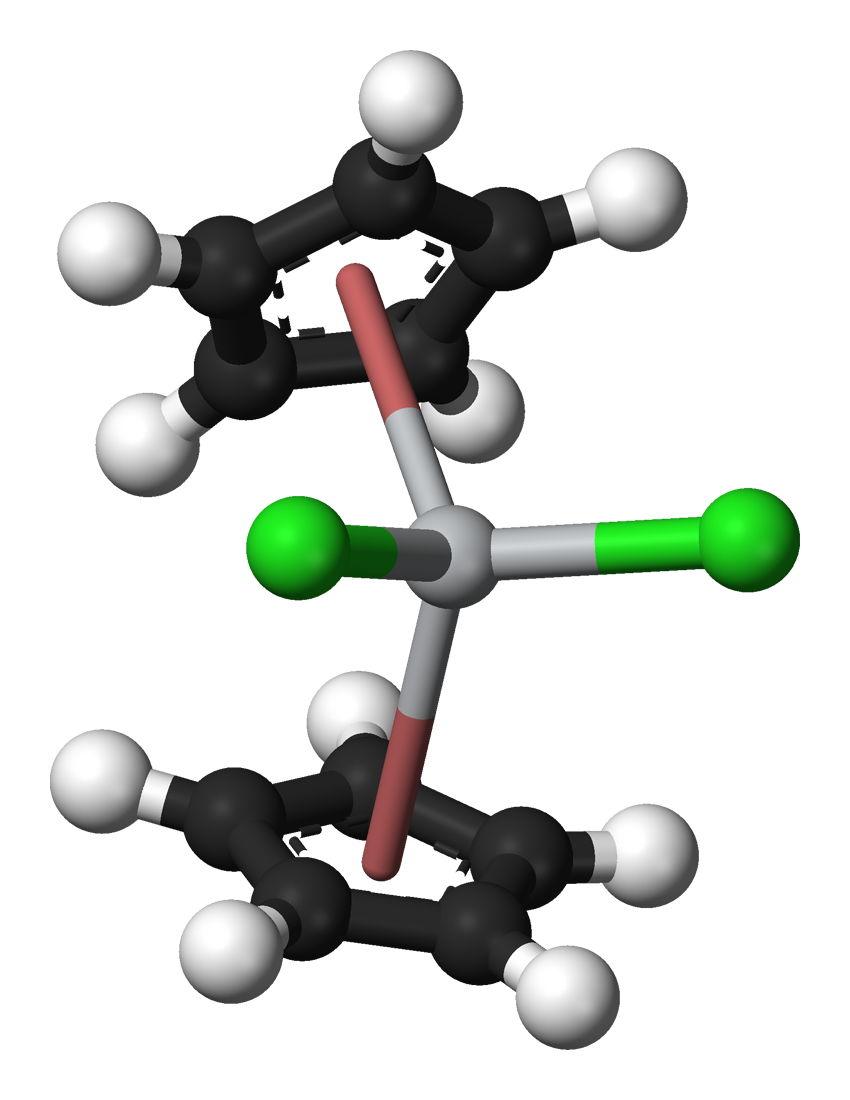
- Ball-and-stick model of titanocene dichloride

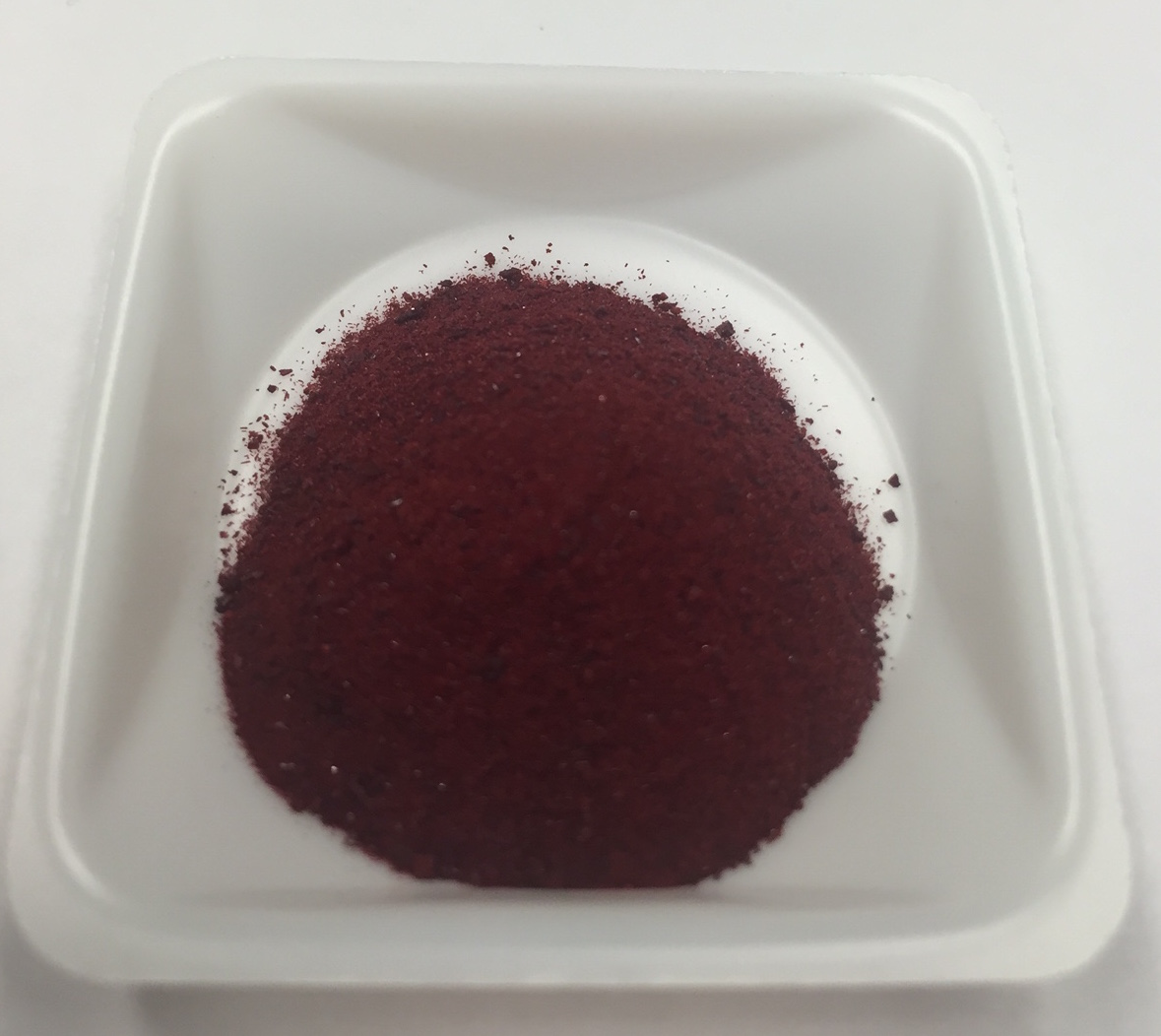
- Sample of titanocene dichloride

Names
- IUPAC name Dichloridobis(η^{5}-cyclopentadienyl)titanium
- Other names titanocene dichloride, dichlorobis(cyclopentadienyl)titanium(IV)

Identifiers
CAS Number	1271-19-8
3D model (JSmol)	Interactive image
ChemSpider	34981141
ECHA InfoCard	100.013.669
EC Number	215-035-9
PubChem CID	5284468
RTECS number	XR2050000
UNII	MJE0547U1U
UN number	3261
CompTox Dashboard (EPA)	DTXSID3021354
- InChI: InChI=1S/2C5H5.2ClH.Ti/c2*1-2-4-5-3-1;;;/h2*1-5H;2*1H;/q2*-1;;;+4/p-2 Key: YMNCCEXICREQQV-UHFFFAOYSA-L; InChI=1/2C5H5.2ClH.Ti/c2*1-2-4-5-3-1;;;/h2*1-5H;2*1H;/q2*-1;;;+4/p-2/r2C5H5.Cl2Ti/c2*1-2-4-5-3-1;1-3-2/h2*1-5H;/q2*-1;+2 Key: YMNCCEXICREQQV-JUFMQDBHAK
- SMILES: [cH-]1cccc1.[cH-]1cccc1.Cl[Ti+2]Cl

Properties
Chemical formula	C_{10}H_{10}Cl_{2}Ti
Molar mass	248.96 g/mol
Appearance	bright red solid
Density	1.60 g/cm^{3}, solid
Melting point	289 °C (552 °F; 562 K)
Solubility in water	sl. sol. with hydrolysis

Structure
Crystal structure	Triclinic
Coordination geometry	Dist. tetrahedral

Hazards
- GHS labelling
Pictograms	(GHS07: Exclamation mark)
Signal word	Warning
Hazard statements	H315, H335
Precautionary statements	P201, P202, P261, P264, P270, P271, P280, P281, P301+P310, P301+P312, P302+P352, P304+P340, P305+P351+P338, P308+P313, P312, P330, P332+P313, P337+P313, P362, P403+P233, P405, P501
NFPA 704 (fire diamond)	2 1

Related compounds
Related compounds	Ferrocene; Zirconocene dichloride Hafnocene dichloride Vanadocene dichloride Niobocene dichloride Tantalocene dichloride Molybdocene dichloride Tungstenocene dichloride TiCl_{4}
- Except where otherwise noted, data are given for materials in their standard state (at 25 °C [77 °F], 100 kPa). verify (what is ?) Infobox references

Titanocene dichloride is the organotitanium compound with the formula (η^{5}-C_{5}H_{5})_{2}TiCl_{2}, commonly abbreviated as Cp_{2}TiCl_{2}. This metallocene is a common reagent in organometallic and organic synthesis. It exists as a bright red solid that slowly hydrolyzes in air. It shows antitumour activity and was the first non-platinum complex to undergo clinical trials as a chemotherapy drug.

== Preparation and structure ==
The standard preparations of Cp_{2}TiCl_{2} start with titanium tetrachloride. The original synthesis by Wilkinson and Birmingham, using sodium cyclopentadienide, is still commonly used:

2 NaC_{5}H_{5} + TiCl_{4} → (C_{5}H_{5})_{2}TiCl_{2} + 2 NaCl

It can also be prepared by using freshly distilled cyclopentadiene rather than its sodium derivative:

2 C_{5}H_{6} + TiCl_{4} → (C_{5}H_{5})_{2}TiCl_{2} + 2 HCl

Focusing on the geometry of the Ti center, Cp_{2}TiCl_{2} adopts a distorted tetrahedral geometry (counting Cp as a monodentate ligand). The Ti-Cl distance is 2.37 Å and the Cl-Ti-Cl angle is 95°.

== Reactions ==
=== Halide replacement reactions ===
Cp_{2}TiCl_{2} serves as a source of Cp_{2}Ti^{2+}. A large range of nucleophiles will displace chloride. With NaSH and with polysulfide salts, one obtains the sulfido derivatives Cp_{2}Ti(SH)_{2} and Cp_{2}TiS_{5}.

The Petasis reagent, Cp_{2}Ti(CH_{3})_{2}, is prepared from the action of methylmagnesium chloride or methyllithium on Cp_{2}TiCl_{2}. This reagent is useful for the conversion of esters into vinyl ethers.

The Tebbe reagent Cp_{2}TiCl(CH_{2})Al(CH_{3})_{2}, arises by the action of 2 equivalents Al(CH_{3})_{3} on Cp_{2}TiCl_{2}.

=== Reactions affecting Cp ligands ===
One Cp ligand can be removed from Cp_{2}TiCl_{2} to give tetrahedral CpTiCl_{3}. This conversion can be effected with TiCl_{4} or by reaction with SOCl_{2}.

The sandwich complex (Cycloheptatrienyl)(cyclopentadienyl)titanium is prepared by treatment of titanocene dichloride with cycloheptatrienyllithium.

Titanocene itself, TiCp_{2}, is so highly reactive that it rearranges into a Ti^{III} hydride dimer and has been the subject of much investigation. This dimer can be trapped by conducting the reduction of titanocene dichloride in the presence of ligands; in the presence of benzene, a fulvalene complex, μ(η^{5}:η^{5}-fulvalene)-di-(μ-hydrido)-bis(η^{5}-cyclopentadienyltitanium), can be prepared and the resulting solvate structurally characterised by X-ray crystallography. The same compound had been reported earlier by a lithium aluminium hydride reduction and sodium amalgam reduction of titanocene dichloride, and studied by ^{1}H NMR prior to its definitive characterisation.

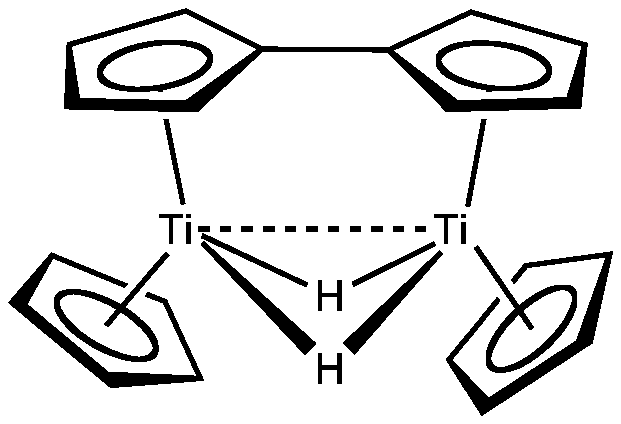
"Titanocene" is not Ti(C_{5}H_{5})_{2}, but rather this isomer with a fulvalene dihydride structure.

=== Redox ===
Reduction with zinc gives the dimer of bis(cyclopentadienyl)titanium(III) chloride in a solvent-mediated chemical equilibrium:

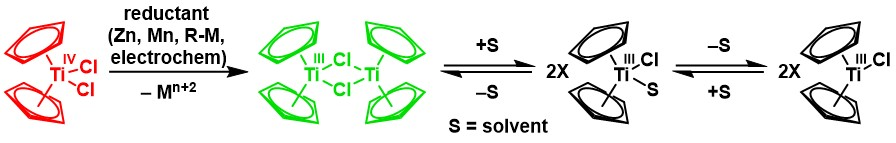

Cp_{2}TiCl_{2} is a precursor to Ti^{II} derivatives. Reductions have been investigated using Grignard reagent and alkyl lithium compounds. More conveniently handled reductants include Mg, Al, or Zn. The following syntheses demonstrate some of the compounds that can be generated by reduction of titanocene dichloride in the presence of π acceptor ligands:

Cp_{2}TiCl_{2} + 2 CO + Mg → Cp_{2}Ti(CO)_{2} + MgCl_{2}
Cp_{2}TiCl_{2} + 2 PR_{3} + Mg → Cp_{2}Ti(PR_{3})_{2} + MgCl_{2}

Alkyne derivatives of titanocene have the formula (C_{5}H_{5})_{2}Ti(C_{2}R_{2}) and the corresponding benzyne complexes are known. One family of derivatives are the titanocyclopentadienes. Rosenthal's reagent, Cp_{2}Ti(η^{2}-Me_{3}SiC≡CSiMe_{3}), can be prepared by this method. Two structures are shown, A and B, which are both resonance contributors to the actual structure of Rosenthal's reagent.

Titanocene equivalents react with alkenyl alkynes followed by carbonylation and hydrolysis to form bicyclic cyclopentadienones, related to the Pauson–Khand reaction. A similar reaction is the reductive cyclization of enones to form the corresponding alcohol in a stereoselective manner.

Reduction of titanocene dichloride in the presence of conjugated dienes such as 1,3-butadiene gives η^{3}-allyltitanium complexes. Related reactions occur with diynes. Furthermore, titanocene can catalyze C–C bond metathesis to form asymmetric diynes.

Titanocene dichloride as a photoredox catalyst to open epoxides in green light.

=== Derivatives of (C_{5}Me_{5})_{2}TiCl_{2} ===
Many analogues of Cp_{2}TiCl_{2} are known. Prominent examples are the ring-methylated derivatives (C_{5}H_{4}Me)_{2}TiCl_{2} and (C_{5}Me_{5})_{2}TiCl_{2}.

== Medicinal research ==
Titanocene dichloride was investigated as an anticancer drug. In fact, it was both the first non-platinum coordination complex and the first metallocene to undergo a clinical trial. Titanocene dichloride itself was ultimately unsuccessful in clinical trials, with its failure attributed to rapid hydrolysis and aggregate formation. This has led to efforts to develop derivatives such as Titanocene Y and Myr-Ti to address these issues - as of 2025, research into these derivatives is still in the preclinical phase.
