= Titanocene dicarbonyl =

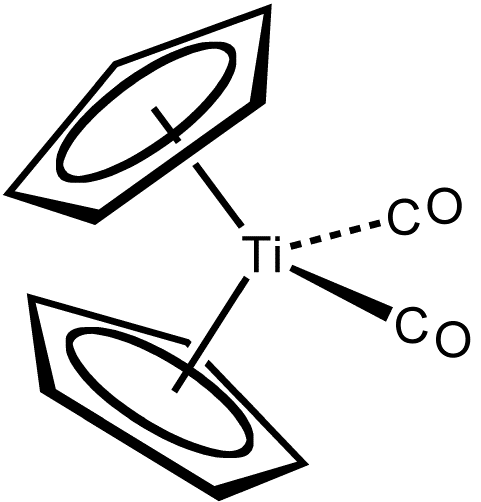
- Dicarbonylbis(cyclopentadienyl)titanium

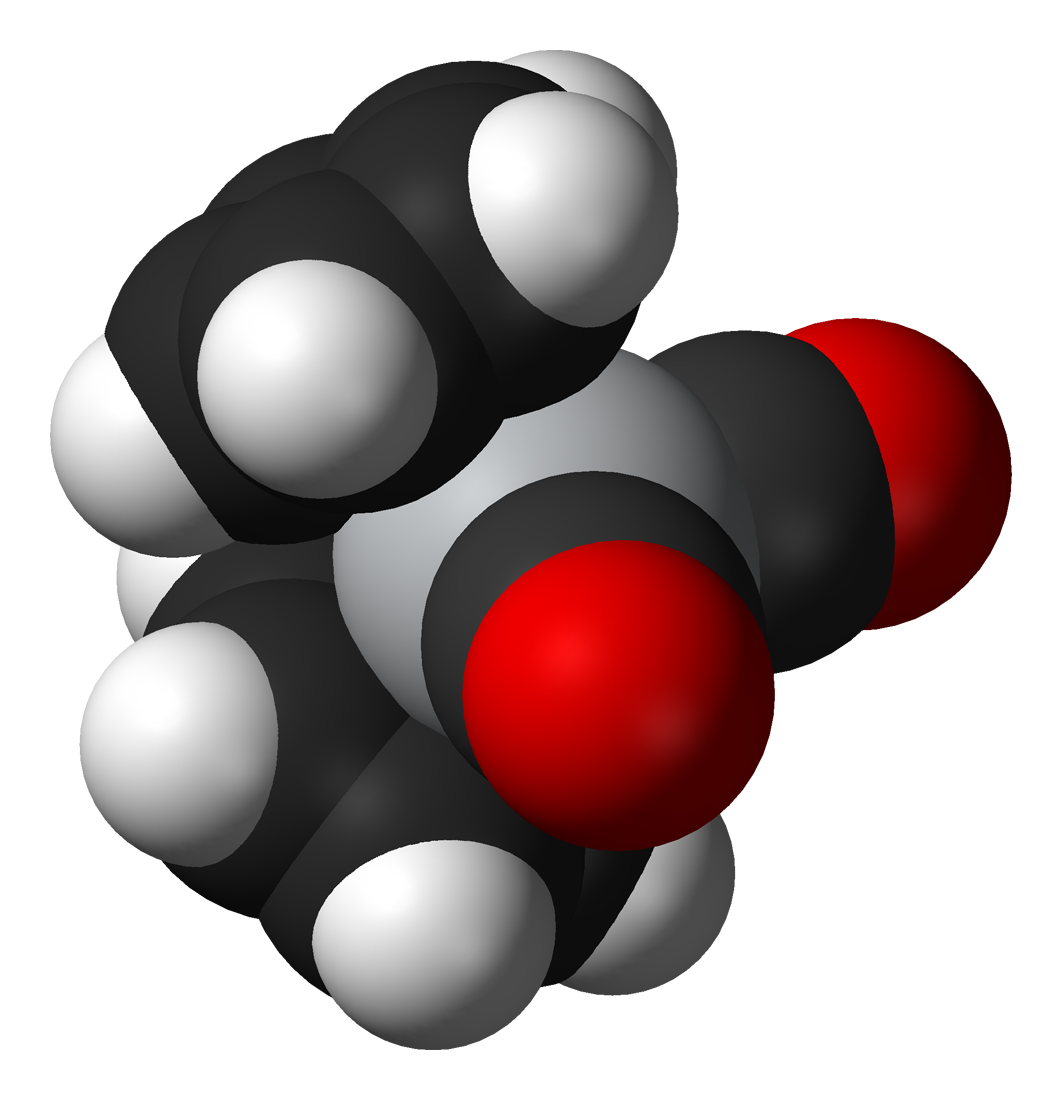
- Space-filling model of the titanocene dicarbonyl molecule

Names
- IUPAC name dicarbonylbis(η^{5}-cyclopentadienyl)titanium(II)
- Other names Dicarbonyldi-π-cyclopentadienyltitanium

Identifiers
CAS Number	12129-51-0
3D model (JSmol)	Interactive image
PubChem CID	74765448
- InChI: InChI=1S/2C5H5.2CO.Ti/c2*1-2-4-5-3-1;2*1-2;/h2*1-3H,4H2;;;/q2*-1;;; Key: AYSYTHDGPPKHIU-UHFFFAOYSA-N
- SMILES: C1C=CC=[C-]1.C1C=CC=[C-]1.C(=O)=[Ti]=C=O

Properties
Chemical formula	C_{12}H_{10}O_{2}Ti
Molar mass	234.09 g/mol
Appearance	maroon solid
Melting point	90 °C (194 °F; 363 K)
Boiling point	Sublimes at 40 to 80 °C (104 to 176 °F; 313 to 353 K) at 0.001 mmHg
Solubility in water	insoluble
Solubility in other solvents	THF, benzene

Structure
Coordination geometry	tetrahedral

Hazards
- Occupational safety and health (OHS/OSH)
Main hazards	flammable

Related compounds
Related compounds	Cp_{2}TiCl_{2}
- Except where otherwise noted, data are given for materials in their standard state (at 25 °C [77 °F], 100 kPa). verify (what is ?) Infobox references

Dicarbonylbis(cyclopentadienyl)titanium is the chemical compound with the formula (η^{5}-C_{5}H_{5})_{2}Ti(CO)_{2}, abbreviated Cp_{2}Ti(CO)_{2}. This maroon-coloured, air-sensitive species is soluble in aliphatic and aromatic solvents. It has been used for the deoxygenation of sulfoxides, reductive coupling of aromatic aldehydes and reduction of aldehydes.

== Structure and synthesis ==
Cp_{2}Ti(CO)_{2} is prepared by the reduction of titanocene dichloride with magnesium as a slurry in THF under an atmosphere of carbon monoxide.

(C_{5}H_{5})_{2}TiCl_{2} + Mg + 2 CO → (C_{5}H_{5})_{2}Ti(CO)_{2} + MgCl_{2}

Both Cp_{2}Ti(CO)_{2} and Cp_{2}TiCl_{2} are tetrahedral as are related zirconium and hafnium compounds. Of historical interest, the complex was first prepared by the reduction of titanocene dichloride with sodium cyclopentadienyl under an atmosphere of carbon monoxide.

Its structure has been confirmed by X-ray crystallography.
