= Wittig reaction =

Chemical coupling reaction

Named after	Georg Wittig
Reaction type	Coupling reaction

Reaction
aldehyde or ketone
+
triphenyl phosphonium ylide
↓
alkene
+
(Ph)_{3}P=O

Conditions
Typical solvents	typically THF or diethyl ether

Identifiers
March's Advanced Organic Chemistry	16–44 (6th ed.)
Organic Chemistry Portal	wittig-reaction
RSC ontology ID	RXNO:0000015
- (what is this?) (verify)

The Wittig reaction or Wittig olefination is a chemical reaction of an aldehyde or ketone with a triphenyl phosphonium ylide called a Wittig reagent. Wittig reactions are most commonly used to convert aldehydes and ketones to alkenes. Most often, the Wittig reaction is used to introduce a methylene group using methylenetriphenylphosphorane (Ph_{3}P=CH_{2}). Using this reagent, even a sterically hindered ketone such as camphor can be converted to its methylene derivative.

== Reaction mechanism ==
Mechanistic studies have focused on unstabilized ylides, because the intermediates can be followed by NMR spectroscopy. The existence and interconversion of the betaine (3a and 3b) is subject of ongoing research. For lithium-free Wittig reactions, studies support a concerted formation of the oxaphosphetane without intervention of a betaine. In particular, phosphonium ylides 1 react with carbonyl compounds 2 via a [2+2] cycloaddition that is sometimes described as having [_{π}2_{s}+_{π}2_{a}] topology to directly form the oxaphosphetanes 4a and 4b. Under lithium-free conditions, the stereochemistry of the product 5 is due to the kinetically controlled addition of the ylide 1 to the carbonyl 2. When lithium is present, there may be equilibration of the intermediates, possibly via betaine species 3a and 3b. Bruce E. Maryanoff and A. B. Reitz identified the issue about equilibration of Wittig intermediates and termed the process "stereochemical drift". For many years, the stereochemistry of the Wittig reaction, in terms of carbon-carbon bond formation, had been assumed to correspond directly with the Z/E stereochemistry of the alkene products. However, certain reactants do not follow this simple pattern. Lithium salts can also exert a profound effect on the stereochemical outcome.

The mechanism of the Wittig reaction

Mechanisms differ for aliphatic and aromatic aldehydes and for aromatic and aliphatic phosphonium ylides. Evidence suggests that the Wittig reaction of unbranched aldehydes under lithium-salt-free conditions do not equilibrate and are therefore under kinetic reaction control. E. Vedejs has put forth a theory to explain the stereoselectivity of stabilized and unstabilized Wittig reactions.

Strong evidence indicated that under Li-free conditions, Wittig reactions involving unstabilized (R_{1}= alkyl, H), semistabilized (R_{1} = aryl), and stabilized (R_{1} = EWG) Wittig reagents all proceed via a [2+2]/retro-[2+2] mechanism under kinetic control, with oxaphosphetane as the one and only intermediate.

== Scope and limitations ==
=== Functional group tolerance ===
The Wittig reagents generally tolerate carbonyl compounds containing several kinds of functional groups such as OH, OR, nitroarenes, epoxides, and sometimes esters and amides. Even ketone, aldehyde, and nitrile groups can be present if conjugated with the ylide — these are the stabilised ylides mentioned above. Bis-ylides (containing two P=C bonds) have also been made and used successfully. There can be a problem with sterically hindered ketones, where the reaction may be slow and give poor yields, particularly with stabilized ylides, and in such cases the Horner–Wadsworth–Emmons (HWE) reaction (using phosphonate esters) is preferred. Another reported limitation is the often labile nature of aldehydes, which can oxidize, polymerize or decompose. In a so-called tandem oxidation-Wittig process the aldehyde is formed in situ by oxidation of the corresponding alcohol.

=== Stereochemistry ===
For the reaction with aldehydes, the double bond geometry is readily predicted based on the nature of the ylide. With unstabilised ylides (R^{3} = alkyl) this results in (Z)-alkene product with moderate to high selectivity. If the reaction is performed in dimethylformamide in the presence of lithium iodide or sodium iodide, the product is almost exclusively the Z-isomer. With stabilized ylides (R^{3} = ester or ketone), the (E)-alkene is formed with high selectivity. The (E)/(Z) selectivity is often poor with semistabilized ylides (R^{3} = aryl).

To obtain the (E)-alkene for unstabilized ylides, the Schlosser modification of the Wittig reaction can be used. Alternatively, the Julia–Kocienski olefination provides the (E)-alkene selectively. Ordinarily, the Horner–Wadsworth–Emmons reaction provides the (E)-enoate (α,β-unsaturated ester), just as the Wittig reaction does. To obtain the (Z)-enolate, the Still-Gennari modification of the Horner-Wadsworth-Emmons reaction can be used.

=== Schlosser modification ===
The main limitation of the traditional Wittig reaction is that the reaction proceeds mainly via the erythro betaine intermediate, which leads to the Z-alkene. The erythro betaine can be converted to the threo betaine using phenyllithium at low temperature. This modification affords the E-alkene.

The Schlosser variant of the Wittig reaction

Allylic alcohols can be prepared by reaction of the betaine ylide with a second aldehyde. For example:

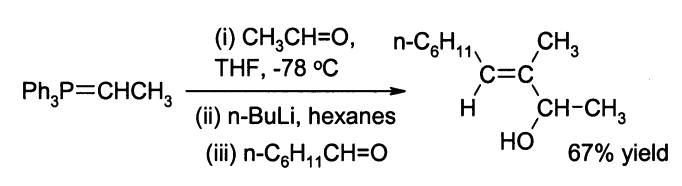
An example of the Schlosser variant of the Wittig reaction

== Example ==
An example of its use is in the synthesis of leukotriene A methyl ester. The first step uses a stabilised ylide, where the carbonyl group is conjugated with the ylide preventing self condensation, although unexpectedly this gives mainly the cis product. The second Wittig reaction uses a non-stabilised Wittig reagent, and as expected this gives mainly the cis product.

An example of the use of the Wittig reaction in synthesis, making leukotriene A methyl ester

== History ==
The Wittig reaction was reported in 1954 by Georg Wittig and his coworker Ulrich Schöllkopf. In part for this contribution, Wittig was awarded the Nobel Prize in Chemistry in 1979.

== See also ==
- Corey–Chaykovsky reagent—form epoxide instead of alkene
- Horner–Wadsworth–Emmons reaction—for insufficiently nucleophilic delocalized carbanions
- Julia–Kocienski olefination—organosulfur analogue
- Kauffmann olefination—add =CH_{2} with Mo or W
- Nysted reagent—add =CH_{2} with Zn
- Organophosphorus chemistry
- Titanium–zinc methylenation—add =CH_{2} with Ti and Zn
- Peterson olefination—stereoselective analogue
- Tebbe's reagent—add =CH_{2} with Ti and Al
- aza-Wittig reaction—form Schiff base instead of alkene
