= Tebbe's reagent =

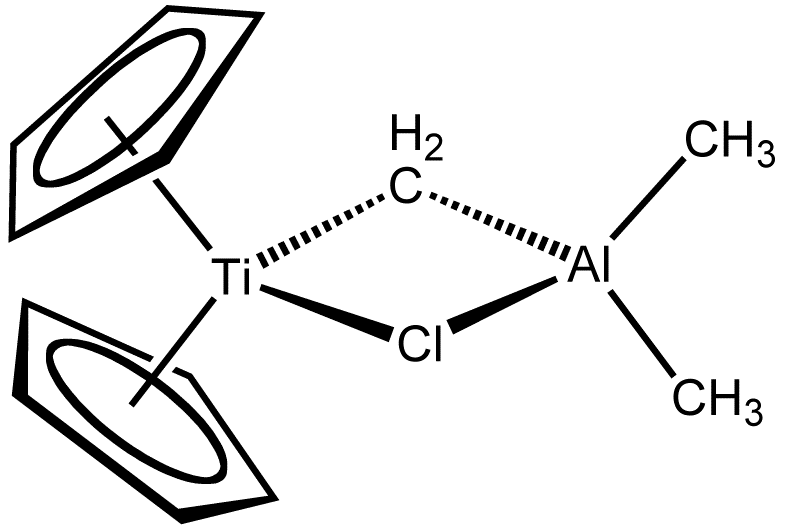
- Structure of Tebbe's reagent

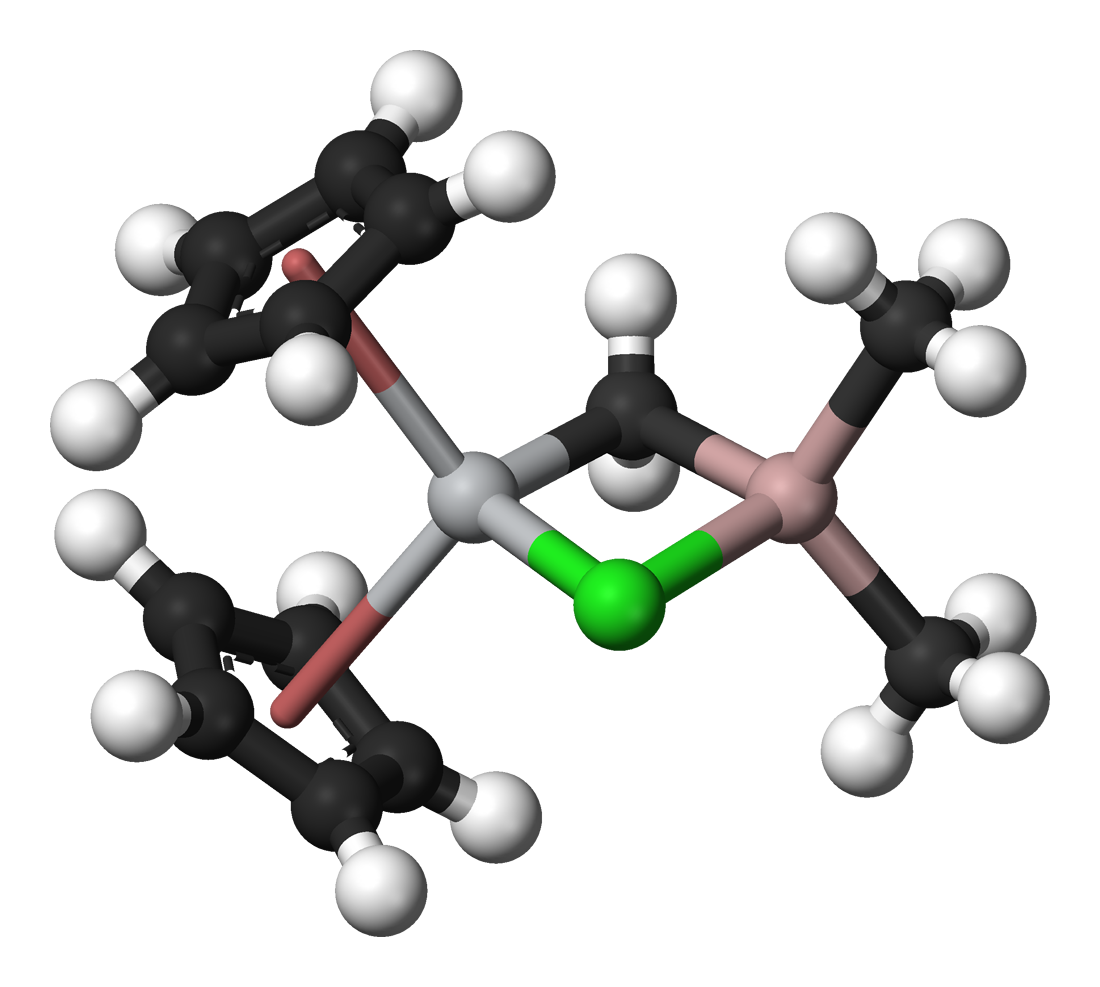
- Ball-and-stick model of Tebbe's reagent

Names
- IUPAC name μ-Chloro[di(cyclopenta-2,4-dien-1-yl)]dimethyl(μ-methylene)titaniumaluminum
- Other names Tebbe reagent

Identifiers
CAS Number	67719-69-1
3D model (JSmol)	Interactive image
ChemSpider	34981139
ECHA InfoCard	100.157.162
PubChem CID	53384502
UNII	V040SDB67S
CompTox Dashboard (EPA)	DTXSID50894875
- InChI: InChI=1S/2C5H5.2CH3.CH2.Al.Cl.Ti/c2*1-2-4-5-3-1;;;;;;/h2*1-5H;2*1H3;1H2;;;/q2*-1;;;;-1;+1;+2 Key: FHPQZKBPAZOMGO-UHFFFAOYSA-N; InChI=1/2C5H5.2CH3.CH2.Al.Cl.Ti/c2*1-2-4-5-3-1;;;;;;/h2*1-5H;2*1H3;1H2;;;/q2*-1;;;;-1;+1;+2/r2C5H5.C3H8AlClTi/c2*1-2-4-5-3-1;1-4(2)3-6-5-4/h2*1-5H;3H2,1-2H3/q2*-1;+2 Key: FHPQZKBPAZOMGO-SBUAZLESAR
- SMILES: C[Al-]1(C[Ti+2][Cl+]1)C.[cH-]1cccc1.[cH-]1cccc1

Properties
Chemical formula	C_{13}H_{18}AlClTi
Molar mass	284.60 g/mol
Solubility in other solvents	toluene, benzene, dichloromethane, THF (low temperatures only)
- Except where otherwise noted, data are given for materials in their standard state (at 25 °C [77 °F], 100 kPa). verify (what is ?) Infobox references

Tebbe's reagent is the organometallic compound with the formula (C_{5}H_{5})_{2}TiCH_{2}ClAl(CH_{3})_{2}. It is used in the methylidenation of carbonyl compounds, that is it converts organic compounds containing the R_{2}C=O group into the related R_{2}C=CH_{2} derivative. It is a red solid that is pyrophoric in the air, and thus is typically handled with air-free techniques. It was originally synthesized by Fred Tebbe at DuPont Central Research.

Tebbe's reagent contains two tetrahedral metal centers linked by a pair of bridging ligands. The titanium has two cyclopentadienyl ([C_{5}H_{5}]^{−}, or Cp) rings and aluminium has two methyl groups. The titanium and aluminium atoms are linked together by both a methylene bridge (-CH_{2}-) and a chloride atom in a nearly square-planar (Ti–CH_{2}–Al–Cl) geometry. The Tebbe reagent was the first reported compound where a methylene bridge connects a transition metal (Ti) and a main group metal (Al).

== Preparation ==
The Tebbe reagent is synthesized from titanocene dichloride and trimethylaluminium in toluene solution.

Cp_{2}TiCl_{2} + 2 Al(CH_{3})_{3} → CH_{4} + Cp_{2}TiCH_{2}AlCl(CH_{3})_{2} + Al(CH_{3})_{2}Cl

After about 3 days, the product is obtained after recrystallization to remove Al(CH_{3})_{2}Cl. Although syntheses using the isolated Tebbe reagent give a cleaner product, successful procedures using the reagent "in situ" have been reported. Instead of isolating the Tebbe reagent, the solution is merely cooled in an ice bath or dry ice bath before adding the starting material.

An alternative but less convenient synthesis entails the use of dimethyltitanocene (Petasis reagent):

Cp_{2}Ti(CH_{3})_{2} + Al(CH_{3})_{2}Cl → Cp_{2}TiCH_{2}AlCl(CH_{3})_{2} + CH_{4}

One drawback to this method, aside from requiring Cp_{2}Ti(CH_{3})_{2}, is the difficulty of separating product from unreacted starting reagent.

== Reaction mechanism ==
Tebbe's reagent itself does not react with carbonyl compounds, but must first be treated with a mild Lewis base, such as pyridine, which generates the active Schrock carbene.

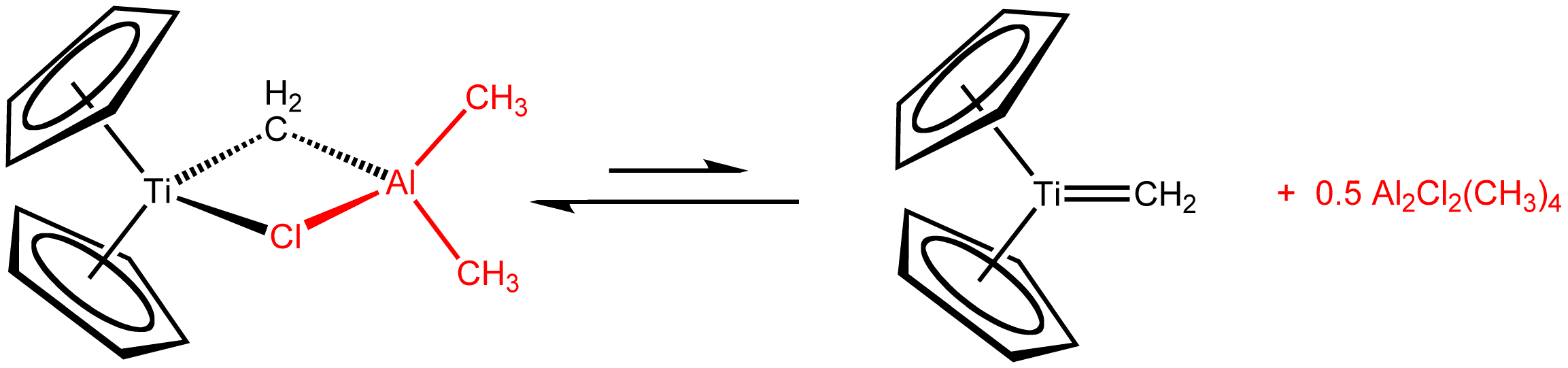

Also analogous to the Wittig reagent, the reactivity appears to be driven by the high oxophilicity of Ti(IV). The Schrock carbene (1) reacts with carbonyl compounds (2) to give a postulated oxatitanacyclobutane intermediate (3). This cyclic intermediate has never been directly isolated, presumably because it breaks down immediately to the produce the desired alkene (5).

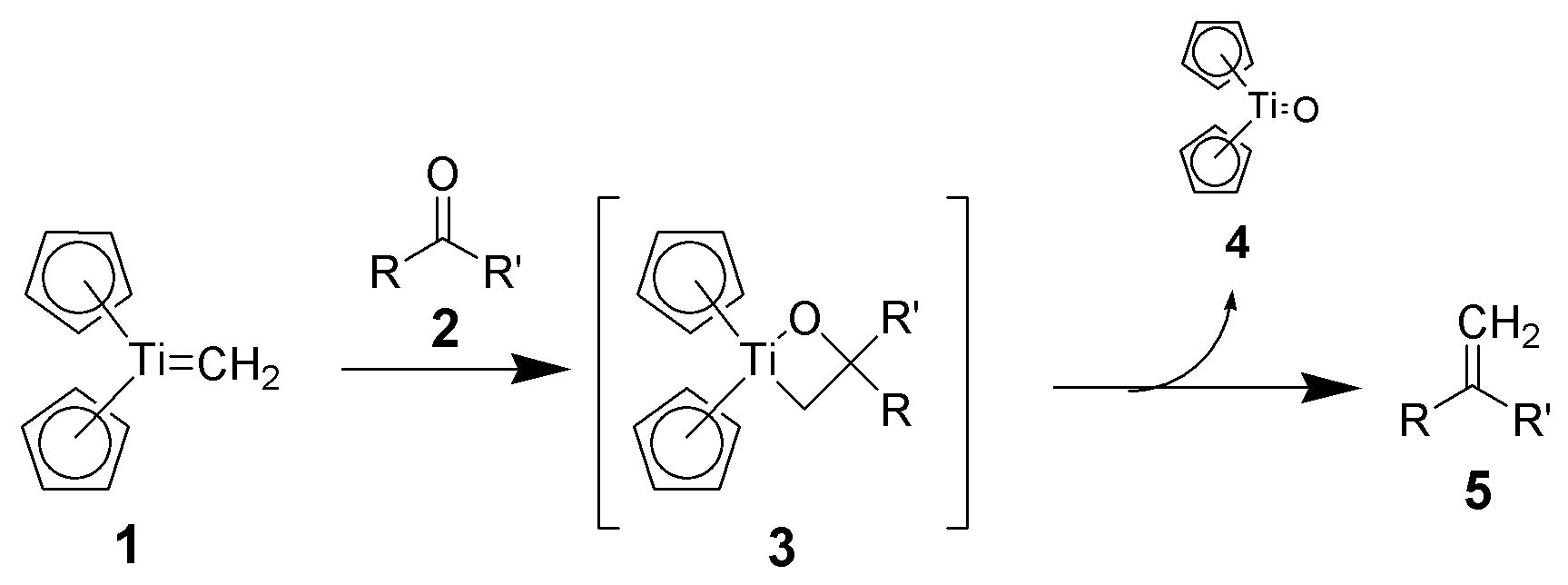

== Scope ==
The Tebbe reagent is used in organic synthesis for carbonyl methylidenation. This conversion can also be effected using the Wittig reaction, although the Tebbe reagent is more efficient especially for sterically encumbered carbonyls. Furthermore, the Tebbe reagent is less basic than the Wittig reagent and does not give the β-elimination products.

Methylidenation reactions also occur for aldehydes as well as esters, lactones and amides. The Tebbe reagent converts esters and lactones to enol ethers and amides to enamines. In compounds containing both ketone and ester groups, the ketone selectively reacts in the presence of one equivalent of the Tebbe reagent.

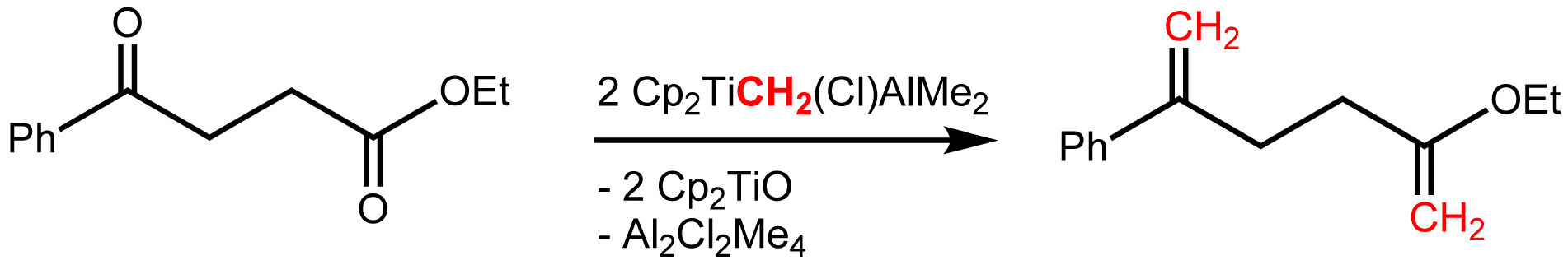

The Tebbe reagent methylidenates carbonyls without racemizing a chiral α carbon. For this reason, the Tebbe reagent has found applications in reactions of sugars where maintenance of stereochemistry can be critical.

The Tebbe reagent reacts with acid chlorides to form titanium enolates by replacing Cl^{−}.

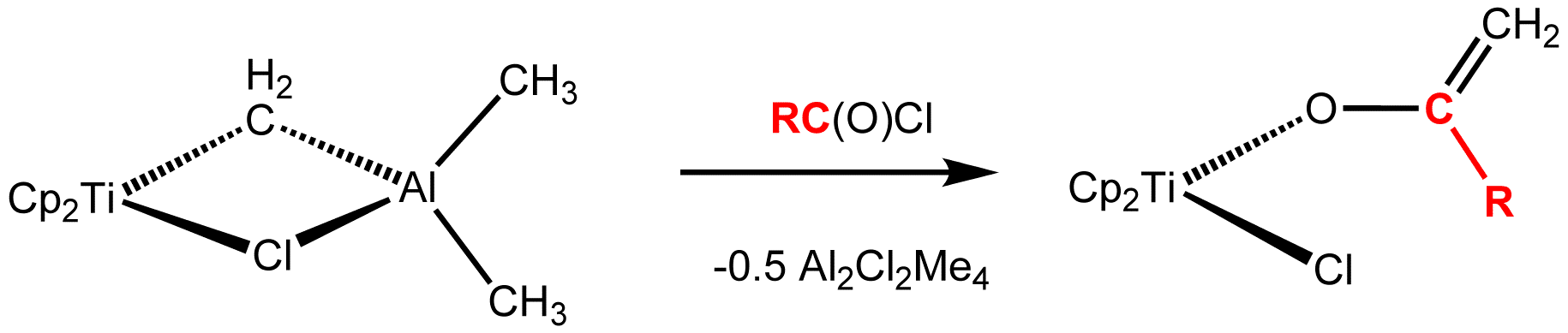

=== Modifications ===
It is possible to modify Tebbe's reagent through the use of different ligands. This can alter the reactivity of the complex, allowing for a broader range of reactions. For example, cyclopropanation can be achieved using a chlorinated analogue.

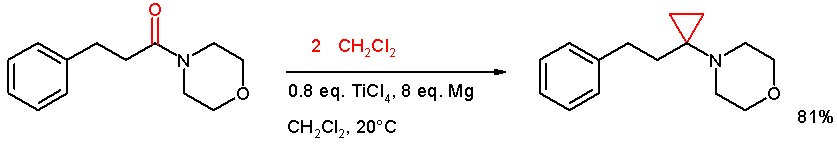

== See also ==
=== Related organotitanium reagents and reactions ===
- Kulinkovich reaction
- Petasis reagent
- Lombardo reagent
- McMurry reaction

=== Related methylidenation reactions ===
- Nysted reagent
- Peterson olefination
- Wittig reaction
- Kauffmann olefination
