= Organometallic chemistry =

Study of organic compounds containing metal(s)

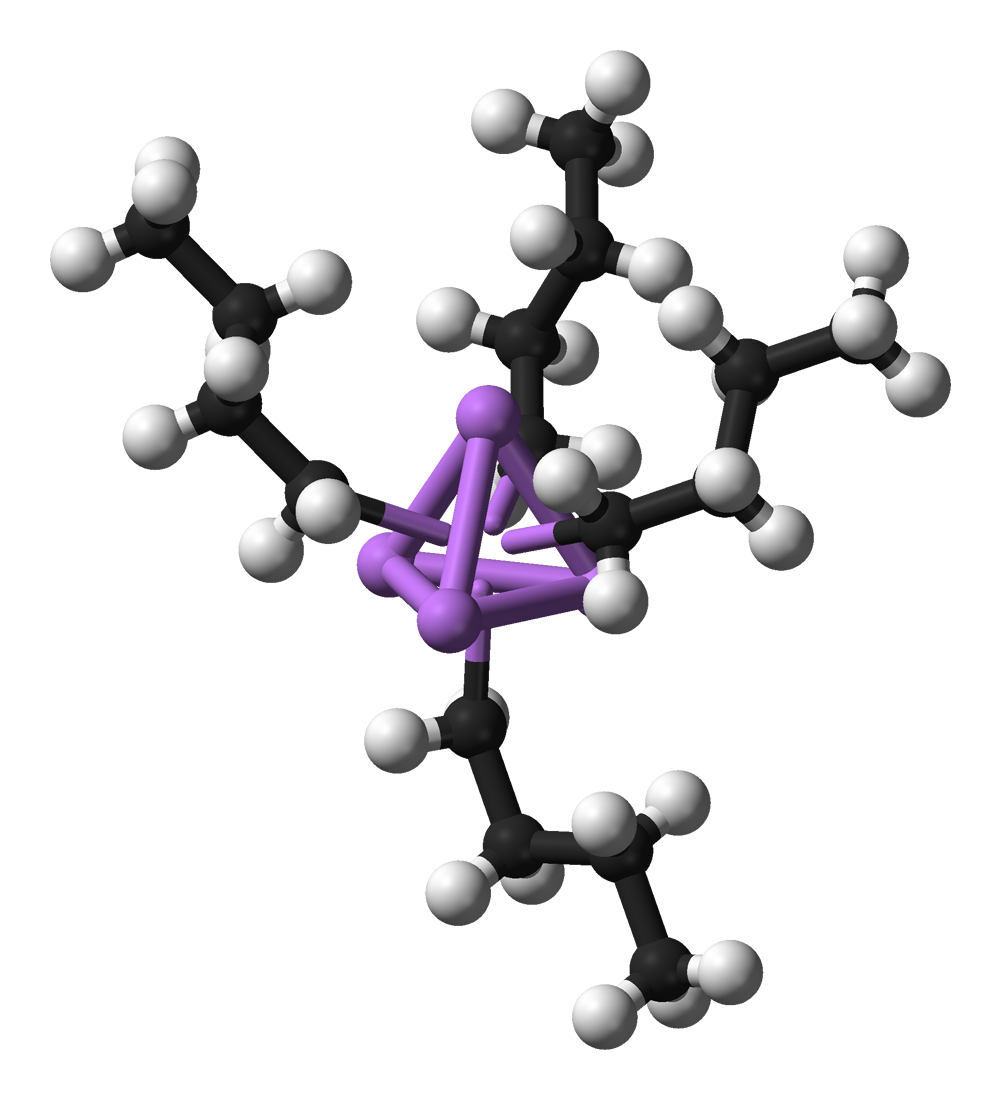
n-Butyllithium, an organometallic compound. Four lithium atoms (in purple) form a tetrahedron, with four butyl groups attached to the faces (carbon is black, hydrogen is white).

Organometallic chemistry is the study of organometallic compounds, chemical compounds containing at least one chemical bond between a carbon atom of an organic molecule and a metal, including alkali, alkaline earth, and transition metals, and sometimes broadened to include metalloids like boron, silicon, and selenium, as well. Aside from bonds to organyl fragments or molecules, bonds to 'inorganic' carbon, like carbon monoxide (metal carbonyls), cyanide, or carbide, are generally considered to be organometallic as well. Some related compounds such as transition metal hydrides and metal phosphine complexes are often included in discussions of organometallic compounds, though strictly speaking, they are not necessarily organometallic. The related but distinct term "metalorganic compound" refers to metal-containing compounds lacking direct metal-carbon bonds but which contain organic ligands. Metal β-diketonates, alkoxides, dialkylamides, and metal phosphine complexes are representative members of this class. The field of organometallic chemistry combines aspects of traditional inorganic and organic chemistry.

Organometallic compounds are widely used both stoichiometrically in research and industrial chemical reactions, as well as in the role of catalysts to increase the rates of such reactions (e.g., as in uses of homogeneous catalysis), where target molecules include polymers, pharmaceuticals, and many other types of practical products.

== Organometallic compounds ==
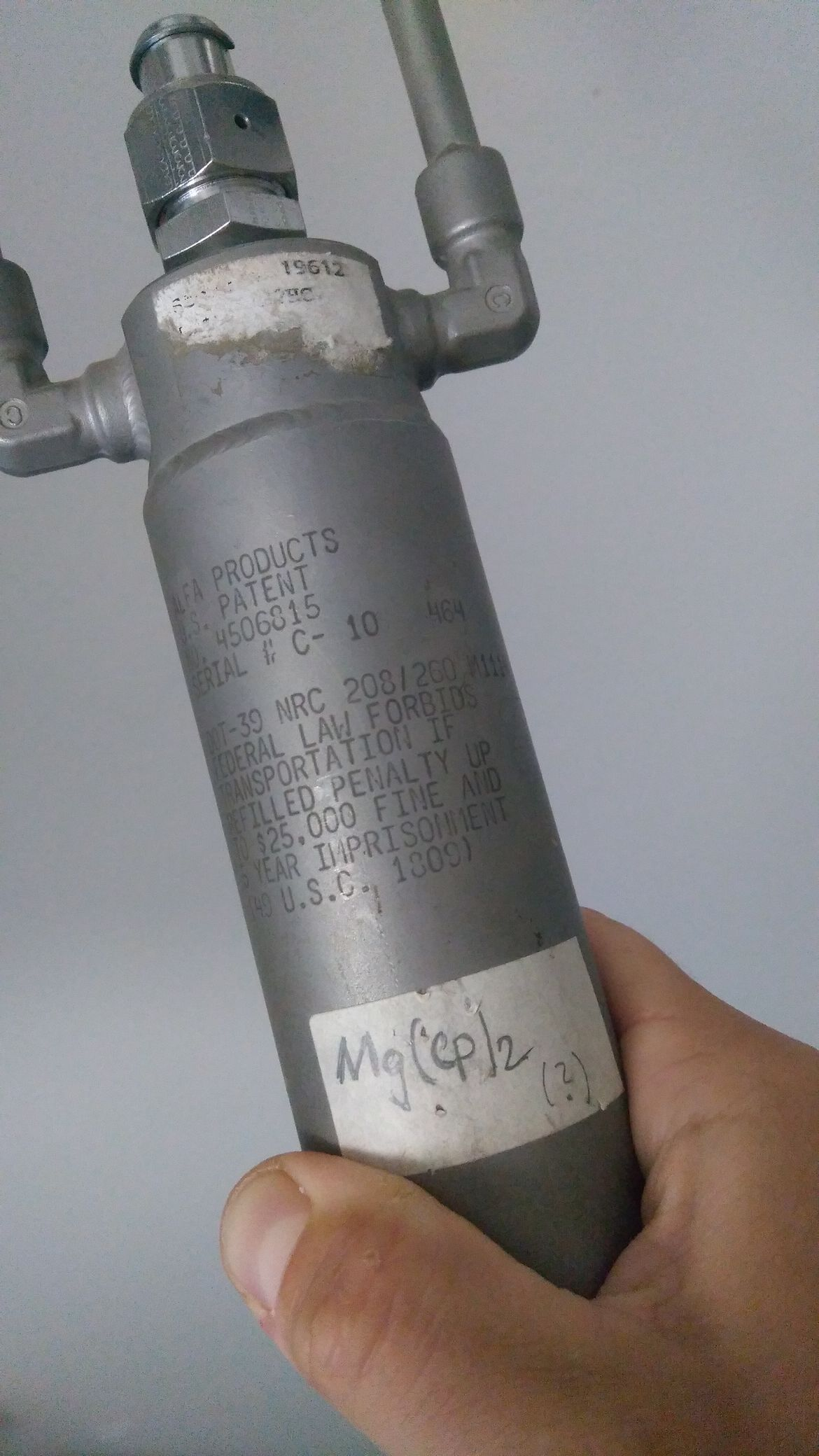
A steel bottle containing MgCp_{2} bis(cyclopentadienyl)magnesium), which, like several other organometallic compounds, is pyrophoric in air.

Organometallic compounds are distinguished by the prefix "organo-" (e.g., organopalladium compounds), and include all compounds which contain a bond between a metal atom and a carbon atom of an organyl group. In addition to the traditional metals (alkali metals, alkaline earth metals, transition metals, and post transition metals), lanthanides, actinides, semimetals, and the elements boron, silicon, arsenic, and selenium are considered to form organometallic compounds. Examples of organometallic compounds include Gilman reagents, which contain lithium and copper, and Grignard reagents, which contain magnesium. Boron-containing organometallic compounds are often the result of hydroboration and carboboration reactions. Tetracarbonyl nickel and ferrocene are examples of organometallic compounds containing transition metals. Other examples of organometallic compounds include organolithium compounds such as n-butyllithium (n-BuLi), organozinc compounds such as diethylzinc (Et_{2}Zn), organotin compounds such as tributyltin hydride (Bu_{3}SnH), organoborane compounds such as triethylborane (Et_{3}B), and organoaluminium compounds such as trimethylaluminium (Me_{3}Al).

A naturally occurring organometallic complex is methylcobalamin (a form of Vitamin B_{12}), which contains a cobalt-methyl bond. This complex, along with other biologically relevant complexes are often discussed within the subfield of bioorganometallic chemistry.

Representative Organometallic Compounds

Ferrocene is an archetypal organoiron complex. It is an air-stable, sublimable compound.

Cobaltocene is a structural analogue of ferrocene, but is highly reactive toward air.

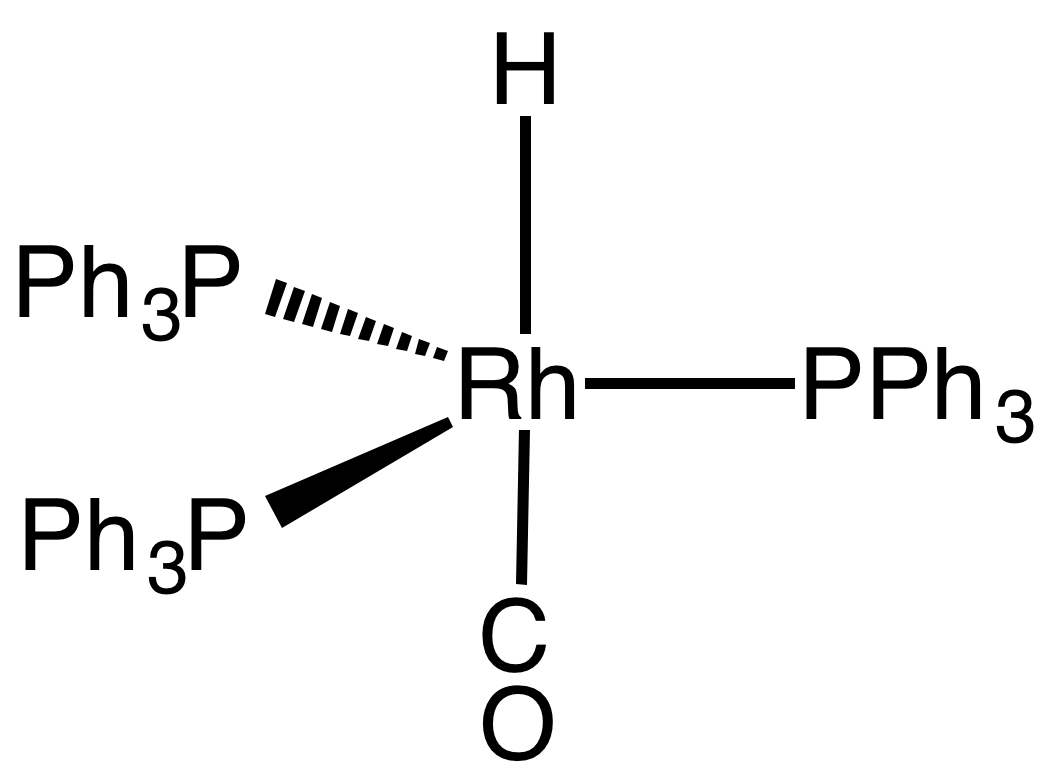
Tris(triphenylphosphine)rhodium carbonyl hydride is used in the commercial production of many aldehyde-based fragrances.

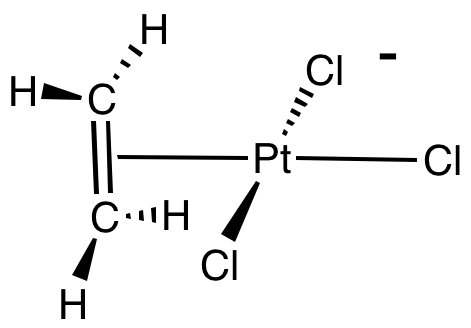
Zeise's salt is an example of a transition metal alkene complex.

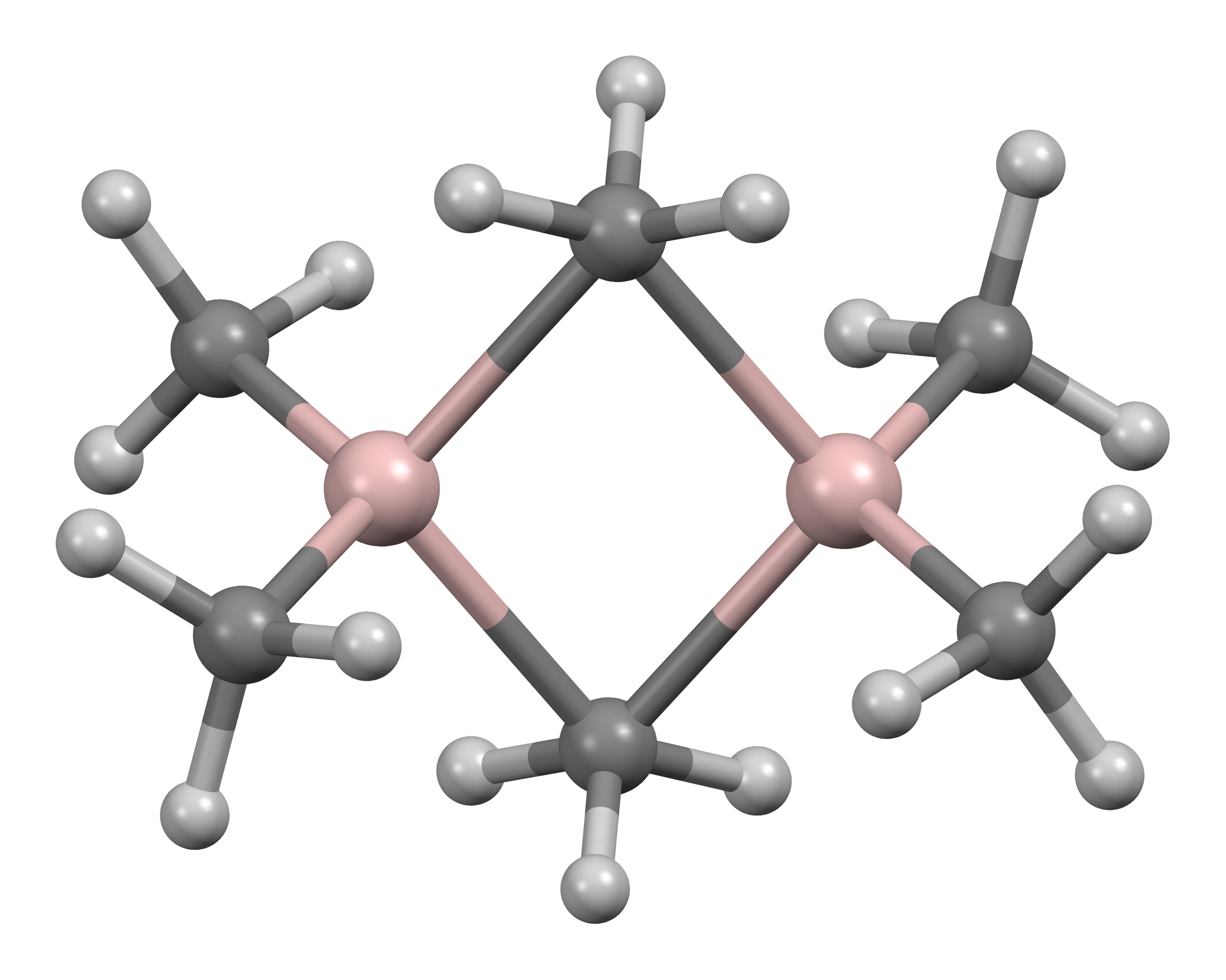
Trimethylaluminium is an organometallic compound with a bridging methyl group. It is used in the industrial production of some alcohols.

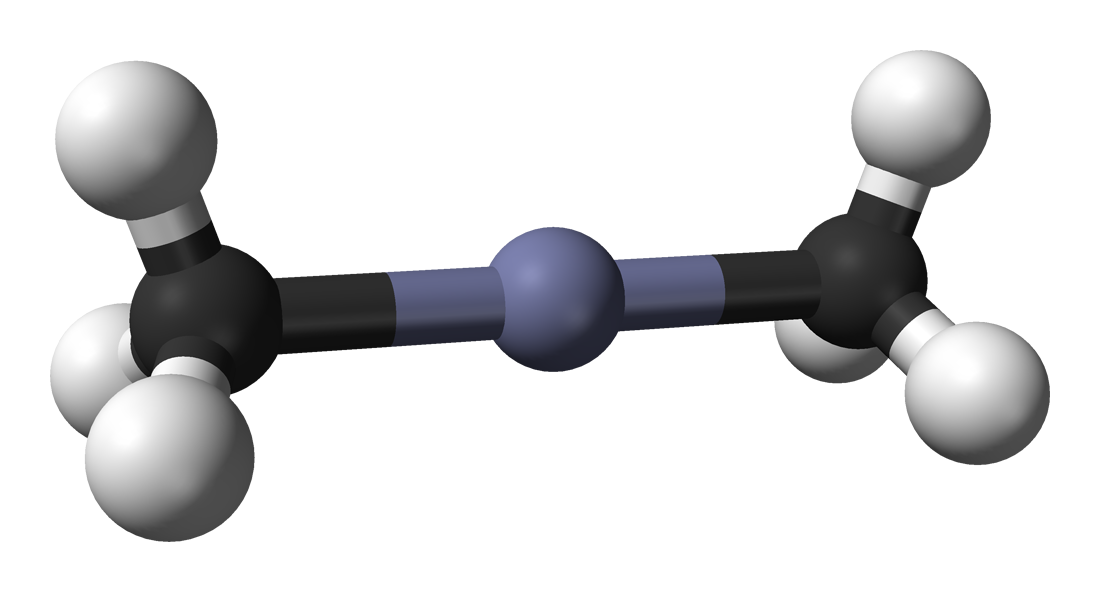
Dimethylzinc has a linear coordination. It is a volatile pyrophoric liquid that is used in the preparation of semiconducting films.

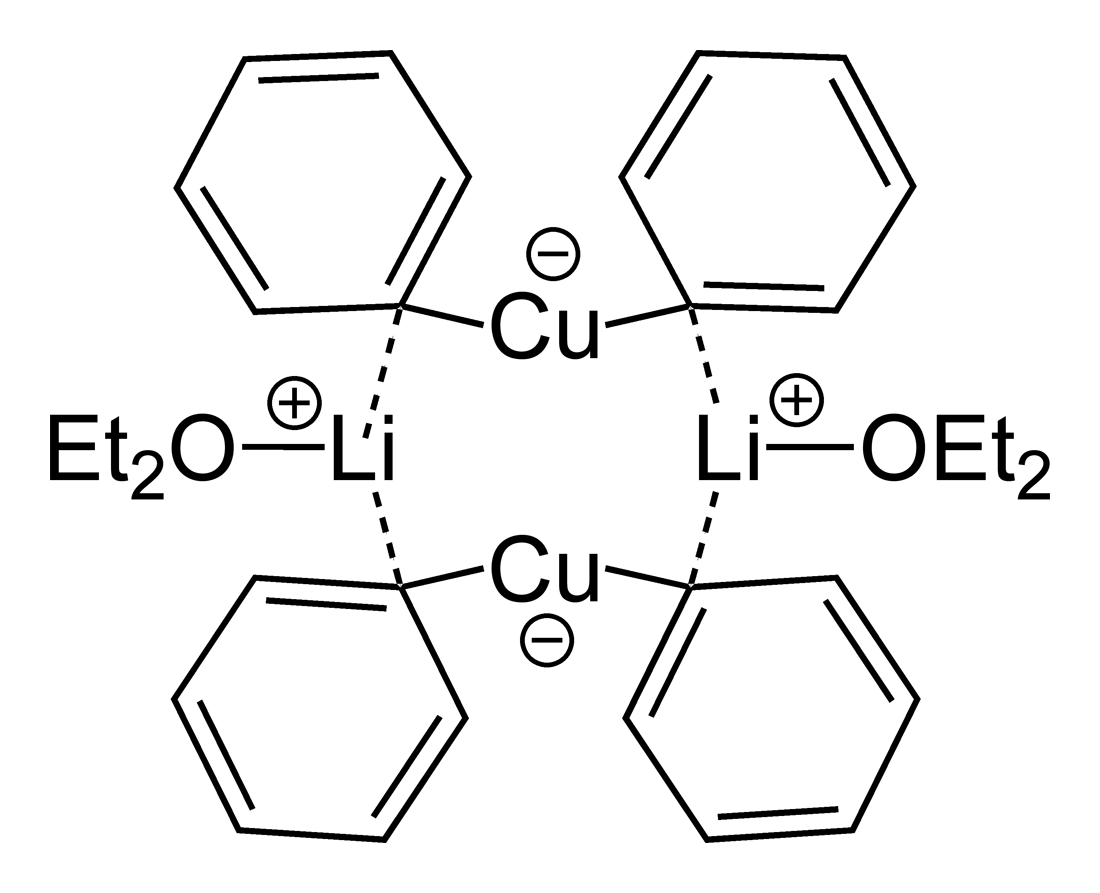
Lithium diphenylcuprate bis(diethyl etherate) is an example of a Gilman reagent, a type of organocopper complex frequently employed in organic synthesis.

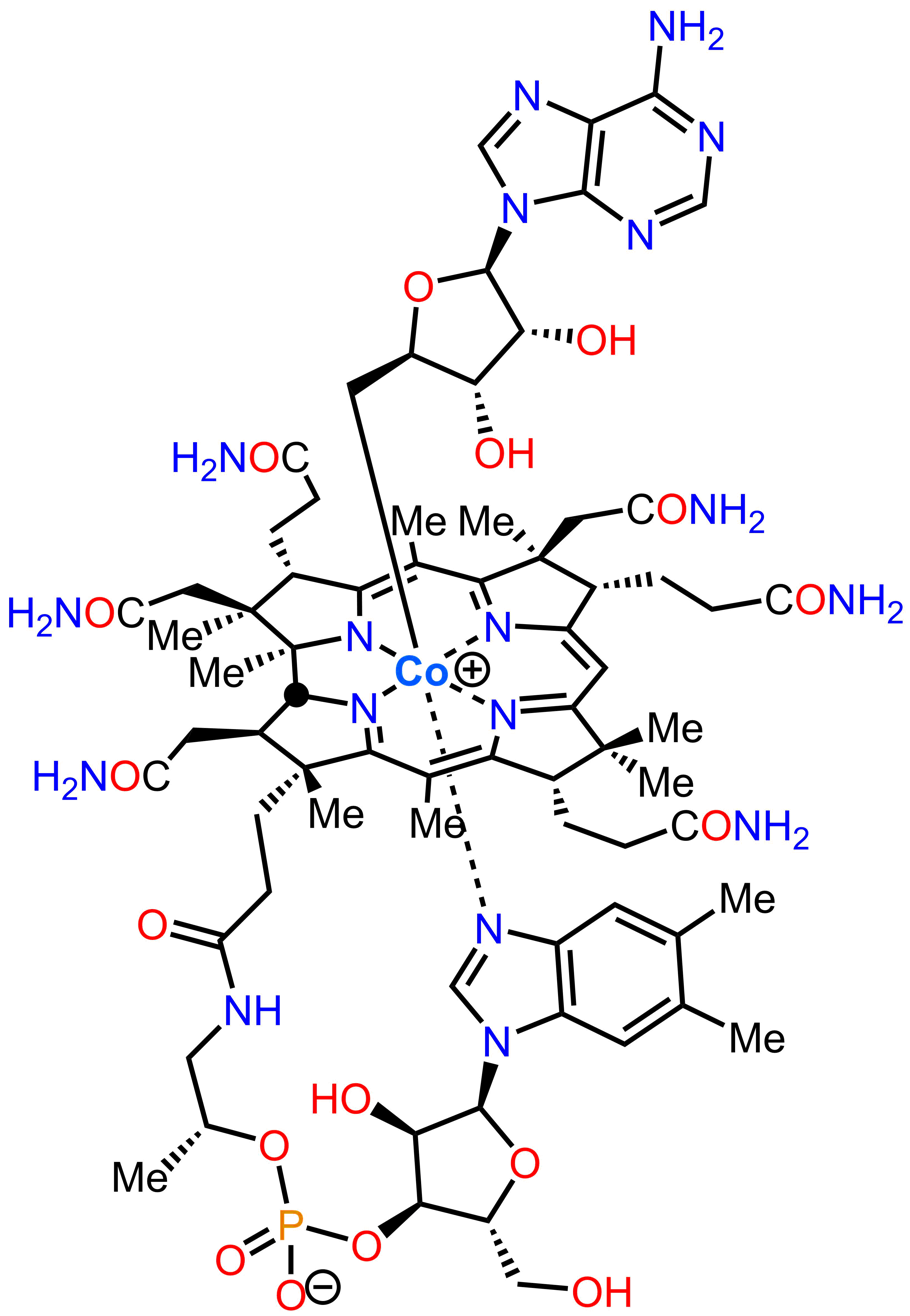
Adenosylcobalamin is a cofactor required by several crucial enzymatic reactions that take place in the human body. It is a rare example of a metal (cobalt) alkyl in biology.

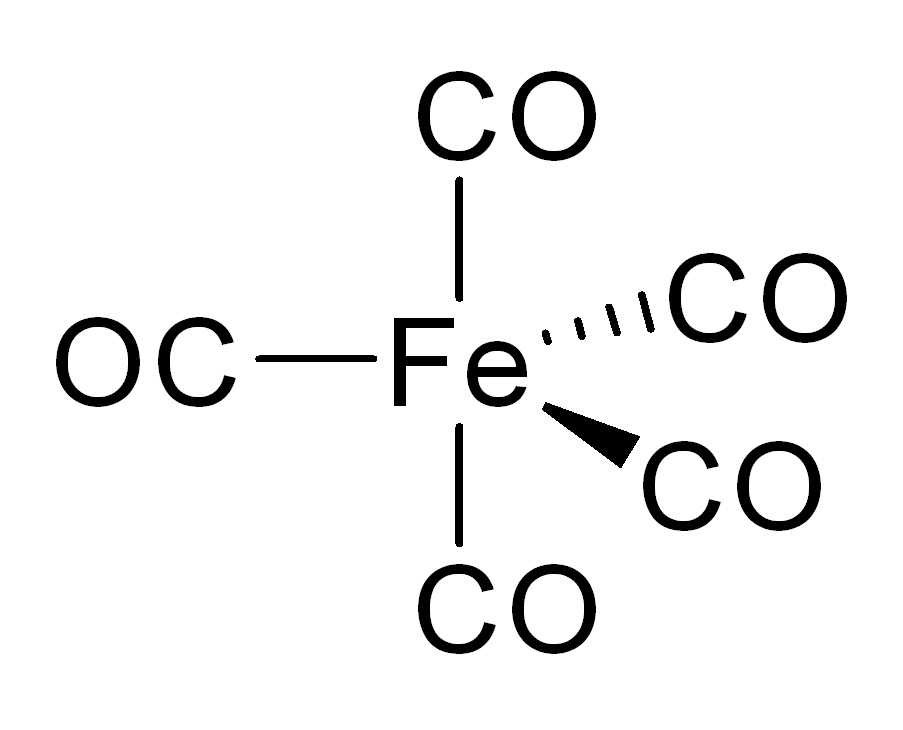
Iron(0) pentacarbonyl is a red-orange liquid prepared directly from the union of finely divided iron and carbon monoxide gas under pressure.

Technetium[^{99m}Tc] sestamibi is used to image the heart muscle in nuclear medicine.

=== Distinction from coordination compounds with organic ligands ===
Many complexes feature coordination bonds between a metal and organic ligands. Complexes where the organic ligands bind the metal through a heteroatom such as oxygen or nitrogen are considered coordination compounds (e.g., heme A and Fe(acac)_{3}). However, if any of the ligands form a direct metal-carbon (M-C) bond, then the complex is considered to be organometallic. Although the IUPAC has not formally defined the term, some chemists use the term "metalorganic" to describe any coordination compound containing an organic ligand regardless of the presence of a direct M-C bond.

The status of compounds in which the canonical anion has a negative charge that is shared between (delocalized) a carbon atom and an atom more electronegative than carbon (e.g. enolates) may vary with the nature of the anionic moiety, the metal ion, and possibly the medium. In the absence of direct structural evidence for a carbon–metal bond, such compounds are not considered to be organometallic. For instance, lithium enolates often contain only Li-O bonds and are not organometallic, while zinc enolates (Reformatsky reagents) contain both Zn-O and Zn-C bonds, and are organometallic in nature.

=== Structure and properties ===
The metal-carbon bond in organometallic compounds is generally highly covalent. For highly electropositive elements, such as lithium and sodium, the carbon ligand exhibits carbanionic character, but free carbon-based anions are extremely rare, an example being cyanide.

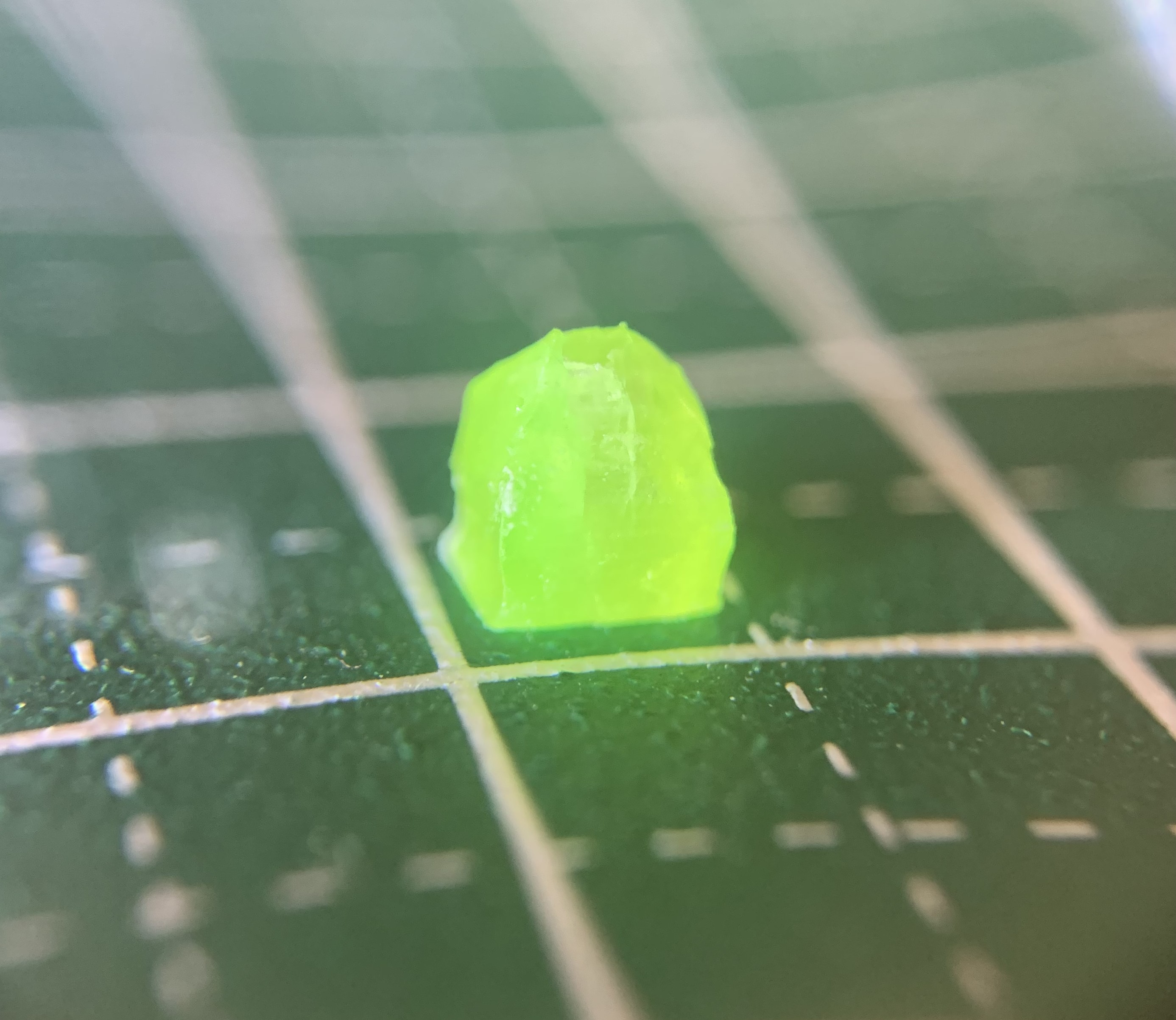
a single crystal of a Mn(II) complex, [BnMIm]4[MnBr4]Br2. Its bright green color originates from spin-forbidden d-d transitions

Most organometallic compounds are solids at room temperature, however some are liquids such as methylcyclopentadienyl manganese tricarbonyl, or even volatile liquids such as nickel tetracarbonyl. Many organometallic compounds are air sensitive. Some organometallic compounds such as triethylaluminium are pyrophoric and will ignite on contact with air.

== Concepts and techniques ==
As in other areas of chemistry, electron counting is useful for organizing organometallic chemistry. The 18-electron rule is helpful in predicting the stabilities of organometallic complexes, for example metal carbonyls and metal hydrides. The 18e rule has two representative electron counting models, ionic and neutral (also known as covalent) ligand models, respectively. The hapticity of a metal-ligand complex, can influence the electron count. Hapticity (η, lowercase Greek eta), describes the number of contiguous ligands coordinated to a metal. For example, ferrocene, [(η^{5}-C_{5}H_{5})_{2}Fe], has two cyclopentadienyl ligands giving a hapticity of 5, where all five carbon atoms of the C_{5}H_{5} ligand bond equally and contribute one electron to the iron center. Ligands that bind non-contiguous atoms are denoted the Greek letter kappa, κ. Chelating κ2-acetate is an example. The covalent bond classification method identifies three classes of ligands, X, L, and Z; which are based on the electron donating interactions of the ligand. Many organometallic compounds do not follow the 18e rule. The metal atoms in organometallic compounds are frequently described by their d electron count and oxidation state. These concepts can be used to help predict their reactivity and preferred geometry. Chemical bonding and reactivity in organometallic compounds is often discussed from the perspective of the isolobal principle.

A wide variety of physical techniques are used to determine the structure, composition, and properties of organometallic compounds. X-ray diffraction is a particularly important technique that can locate the positions of atoms within a solid compound, providing a detailed description of its structure. Other techniques like infrared spectroscopy and nuclear magnetic resonance spectroscopy are also frequently used to obtain information on the structure and bonding of organometallic compounds. Ultraviolet-visible spectroscopy is a common technique used to obtain information on the electronic structure of organometallic compounds. It is also used monitor the progress of organometallic reactions, as well as determine their kinetics. The dynamics of organometallic compounds can be studied using dynamic NMR spectroscopy. Other notable techniques include X-ray absorption spectroscopy, electron paramagnetic resonance spectroscopy, and elemental analysis.

Due to their high reactivity towards oxygen and moisture, organometallic compounds often must be handled using air-free techniques. Air-free handling of organometallic compounds typically requires the use of laboratory apparatuses such as a glovebox or Schlenk line.

== History ==
Early developments in organometallic chemistry include Louis Claude Cadet's synthesis of methyl arsenic compounds related to cacodyl, William Christopher Zeise's platinum-ethylene complex, Edward Frankland's discovery of diethyl- and dimethylzinc, Ludwig Mond's discovery of Ni(CO)_{4}, and Victor Grignard's organomagnesium compounds. (Although not always acknowledged as an organometallic compound, Prussian blue, a mixed-valence iron-cyanide complex, was first prepared in 1706 by paint maker Johann Jacob Diesbach as the first coordination polymer and synthetic material containing a metal-carbon bond.) The abundant and diverse products from coal and petroleum led to Ziegler–Natta, Fischer–Tropsch, hydroformylation catalysis which employ CO, H_{2}, and alkenes as feedstocks and ligands.

Recognition of organometallic chemistry as a distinct subfield culminated in the Nobel Prizes to Ernst Fischer and Geoffrey Wilkinson for work on metallocenes. In 2005, Yves Chauvin, Robert H. Grubbs and Richard R. Schrock shared the Nobel Prize for metal-catalyzed olefin metathesis.

=== Organometallic chemistry timeline ===
- 1760 Louis Claude Cadet de Gassicourt isolates the organoarsenic compound cacodyl
- 1827 William Christopher Zeise produces Zeise's salt; the first metal-alkene complex
- 1848 Edward Frankland discovers diethylzinc
- 1890 Ludwig Mond discovers nickel carbonyl
- 1899 John Ulric Nef discovers alkynylation using sodium acetylides.
- 1909 Paul Ehrlich introduces Salvarsan for the treatment of syphilis, an early arsenic based organometallic compound
- 1912 Nobel Prize Victor Grignard and Paul Sabatier
- 1930 Henry Gilman invents lithium cuprates, see Gilman reagent
- 1940 Eugene G. Rochow and Richard Müller discover the direct process for preparing organosilicon compounds
- 1930's and 1940's Otto Roelen and Walter Reppe develop metal-catalyzed hydroformylation and acetylene chemistry
- 1951 Walter Hieber was awarded the Alfred Stock prize for his work with metal carbonyl chemistry.
- 1951 Ferrocene is discovered
- 1956 Dorothy Crawfoot Hodgkin determines the structure of vitamin B_{12}, the first biomolecule found to contain a metal-carbon bond, see bioorganometallic chemistry
- 1963 Nobel prize for Karl Ziegler and Giulio Natta on alkene polymerization catalysis (see Ziegler–Natta catalyst)
- 1973 Nobel prize Geoffrey Wilkinson and Ernst Otto Fischer on sandwich compounds
- 2001 Nobel prize W. S. Knowles, R. Noyori (and Karl Barry Sharpless) for asymmetric hydrogenation using chiral catalysts
- 2005 Nobel prize Yves Chauvin, Robert Grubbs, and Richard Schrock on metal-catalyzed alkene metathesis
- 2010 Nobel prize Richard F. Heck, Ei-ichi Negishi, Akira Suzuki for palladium-catalyzed cross coupling reactions

== Scope ==
Subspecialty areas of organometallic chemistry include:

- Period 2 elements: organolithium chemistry, organoberyllium chemistry, organoborane chemistry
- Period 3 elements: organosodium chemistry, organomagnesium chemistry, organoaluminium chemistry, organosilicon chemistry
- Period 4 elements: organocalcium chemistry, organoscandium chemistry, organotitanium chemistry, organovanadium chemistry, organochromium chemistry, organomanganese chemistry, organoiron chemistry, organocobalt chemistry, organonickel chemistry, organocopper chemistry, organozinc chemistry, organogallium chemistry, organogermanium chemistry, organoarsenic chemistry, organoselenium chemistry
- Period 5 elements: organoyttrium chemistry, organozirconium chemistry, organoniobium chemistry, organomolybdenum chemistry, organotechnetium chemistry, organoruthenium chemistry, organorhodium chemistry, organopalladium chemistry, organosilver chemistry, organocadmium chemistry, organoindium chemistry, organotin chemistry, organoantimony chemistry, organotellurium chemistry
- Period 6 elements: organolanthanide chemistry, organocerium chemistry, organotantalum chemistry, organotungsten chemistry, organorhenium chemistry, organoosmium chemistry, organoiridium chemistry, organoplatinum chemistry, organogold chemistry, organomercury chemistry, organothallium chemistry, organolead chemistry, organobismuth chemistry, organopolonium chemistry
- Period 7 elements: organoactinide chemistry, organothorium chemistry, organouranium chemistry, organoneptunium chemistry

== Industrial applications ==
Organometallic compounds find wide use in commercial reactions, both as homogeneous catalysts and as stoichiometric reagents. For instance, organolithium, organomagnesium, and organoaluminium compounds, examples of which are highly basic and highly reducing, are useful stoichiometrically but also catalyze many polymerization reactions.

Almost all processes involving carbon monoxide rely on catalysts, notable examples being described as carbonylations. The production of acetic acid from methanol and carbon monoxide is catalyzed via metal carbonyl complexes in the Monsanto process and Cativa process. Most synthetic aldehydes are produced via hydroformylation. The bulk of the synthetic alcohols, at least those larger than ethanol, are produced by hydrogenation of hydroformylation-derived aldehydes. Similarly, the Wacker process is used in the oxidation of ethylene to acetaldehyde.

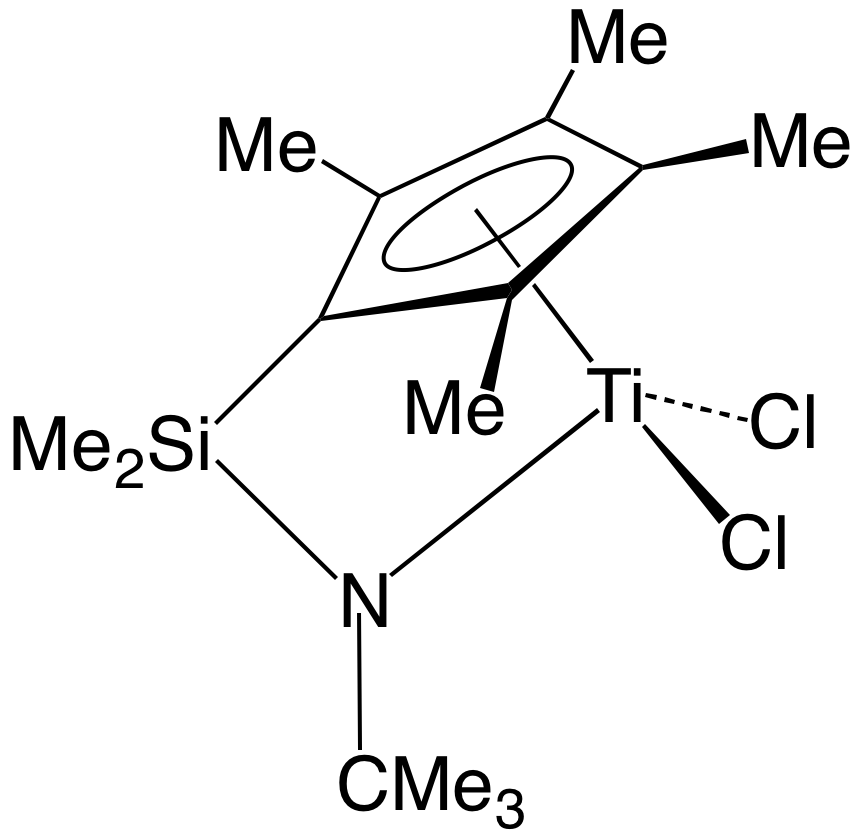
A constrained geometry organotitanium complex is a precatalyst for olefin polymerization.

Almost all industrial processes involving alkene-derived polymers rely on organometallic catalysts. The world's polyethylene and polypropylene are produced both heterogeneously via Ziegler–Natta catalysis and homogeneously, e.g., via constrained geometry catalysts.

Most processes involving hydrogen rely on metal-based catalysts. Whereas bulk hydrogenations (e.g., margarine production) rely on heterogeneous catalysts, for the production of fine chemicals such hydrogenations rely on soluble (homogenous) organometallic complexes or involve organometallic intermediates. Organometallic complexes allow these hydrogenations to be effected asymmetrically.

Many semiconductors are produced from trimethylgallium, trimethylindium, trimethylaluminium, and trimethylantimony. These volatile compounds are decomposed along with ammonia, arsine, phosphine and related hydrides on a heated substrate via metalorganic vapor phase epitaxy (MOVPE) process in the production of light-emitting diodes (LEDs).

== Organometallic reactions ==
Organometallic compounds undergo several important reactions:

- associative and dissociative substitution
- oxidative addition and reductive elimination
- transmetalation
- migratory insertion
- β-hydride elimination
- electron transfer
- carbon–hydrogen bond activation
- carbometalation
- hydrometalation
- cyclometalation
- nucleophilic abstraction

The synthesis of many organic molecules are facilitated by organometallic complexes. Sigma-bond metathesis is a synthetic method for forming new carbon-carbon sigma bonds. Sigma-bond metathesis is typically used with early transition-metal complexes that are in their highest oxidation state. Using transition-metals that are in their highest oxidation state prevents other reactions from occurring, such as oxidative addition. In addition to sigma-bond metathesis, olefin metathesis is used to synthesize various carbon-carbon pi bonds. Neither sigma-bond metathesis or olefin metathesis change the oxidation state of the metal. Many other methods are used to form new carbon-carbon bonds, including beta-hydride elimination and insertion reactions.

== Catalysis ==
Organometallic complexes are commonly used in catalysis. Major industrial processes include hydrogenation, hydrosilylation, hydrocyanation, olefin metathesis, alkene polymerization, alkene oligomerization, hydrocarboxylation, methanol carbonylation, and hydroformylation. The catalytically active organometallic species are often generated in situ starting from commercially available metal salts. Organometallic intermediates are also invoked in many heterogeneous catalysis processes, analogous to those listed above. Additionally, organometallic intermediates are assumed for Fischer–Tropsch process.

Organometallic complexes are commonly used in fine chemical synthesis as well, especially in cross-coupling reactions that form carbon-carbon bonds, e.g. Suzuki-Miyaura coupling, Buchwald-Hartwig amination for producing aryl amines from aryl halides, and Sonogashira coupling, etc.

Organometallic species are also involved in photoredox catalysis, although not on a commercial scale.

== Environmental concerns ==
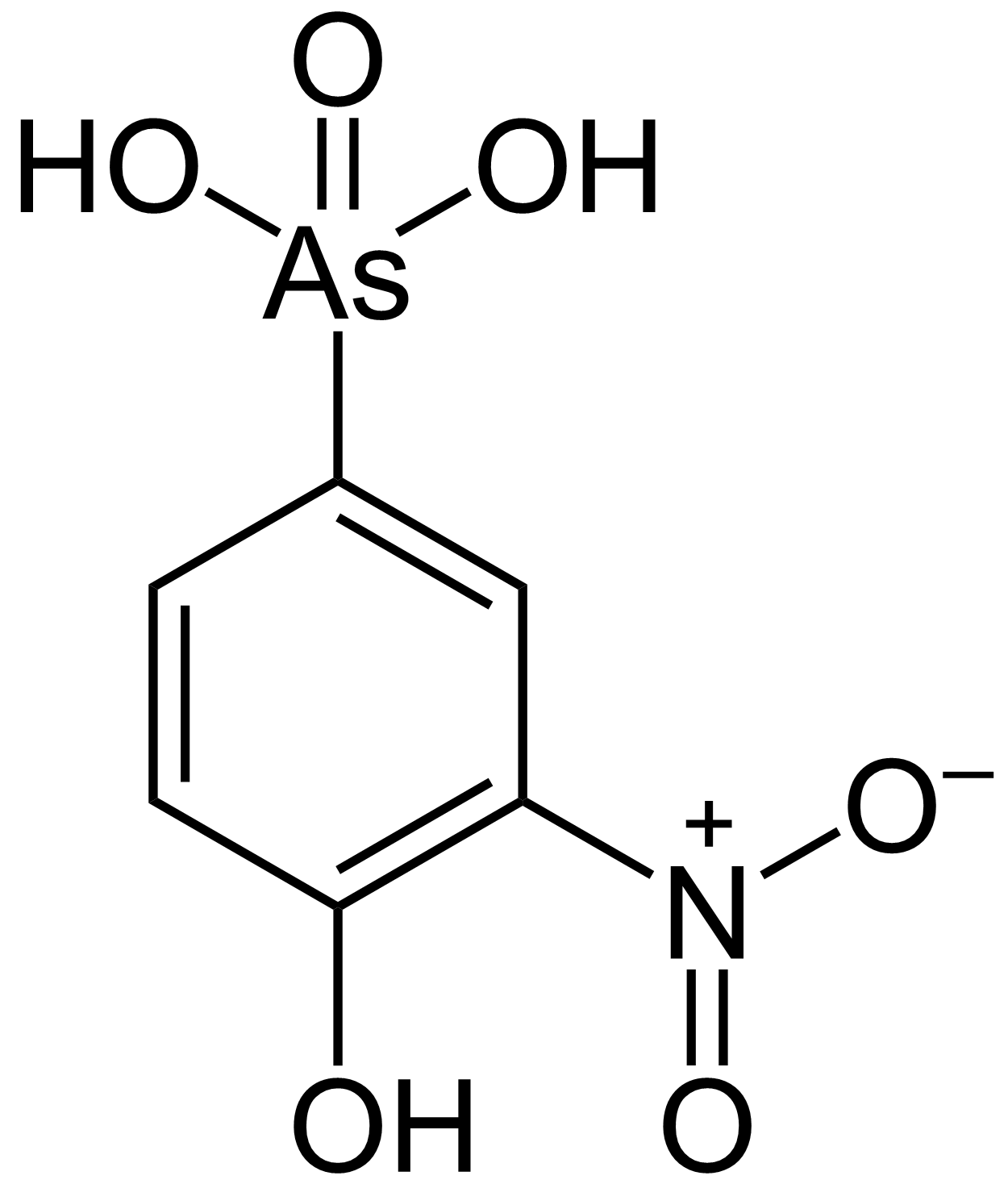
Roxarsone is an organoarsenic compound used as an animal feed.

Natural and contaminant organometallic compounds are found in the environment. Some that are remnants of human use, such as organolead and organomercury compounds, are toxicity hazards. Tetraethyllead was prepared for use as a gasoline additive but has fallen into disuse because of lead's toxicity. Its replacements are other organometallic compounds, such as ferrocene and methylcyclopentadienyl manganese tricarbonyl (MMT). The organoarsenic compound roxarsone is a controversial animal feed additive. In 2006, approximately one million kilograms of it were produced in the U.S alone. Organotin compounds were once widely used in anti-fouling paints but have since been banned due to environmental concerns.

== See also ==
- Bioorganometallic chemistry
- Metal carbon dioxide complex

== Sources ==
- Clayden, Jonathan; Greeves, Nick; Warren, Stuart (2012). Organic Chemistry. OUP Oxford. ISBN 978-0-19-927029-3.
- Crabtree, Robert H. (2009). The Organometallic Chemistry of the Transition Metals. John Wiley & Sons. ISBN 978-0-470-25762-3.
- Elschenbroich, Christoph (2016). Organometallics. John Wiley & Sons. ISBN 978-3-527-80514-3.
- Gupta, B. D; Elias, A J (2013). Basic Organometallic Chemistry: Concepts, Syntheses, and Applications of Transition Metals. Hyderabad: Universities Press. ISBN 978-81-7371-709-3. OCLC 903314566.
- Jenkins, Paul R. (1992). Organometallic Reagents in Synthesis. Oxford University Press. ISBN 978-0-19-855666-4.
- Leeuwen, Piet W. N. M. van (2005). Homogeneous Catalysis: Understanding the Art. Springer Science & Business Media. ISBN 978-1-4020-3176-2.
- Lippard, Stephen J.; Berg, Jeremy Mark (1994). Principles of Bioinorganic Chemistry. University Science Books. ISBN 978-0-935702-73-6.
- Pearson, Anthony J (1985). Metallo-organic chemistry. Wiley. OCLC 1200566627.
- Shriver, Duward; Weller, Mark; Overton, Tina; Armstrong, Fraser; Rourke, Jonathan (2014). Inorganic Chemistry. W. H. Freeman. ISBN 978-1-4292-9906-0.
