= Scandocene =

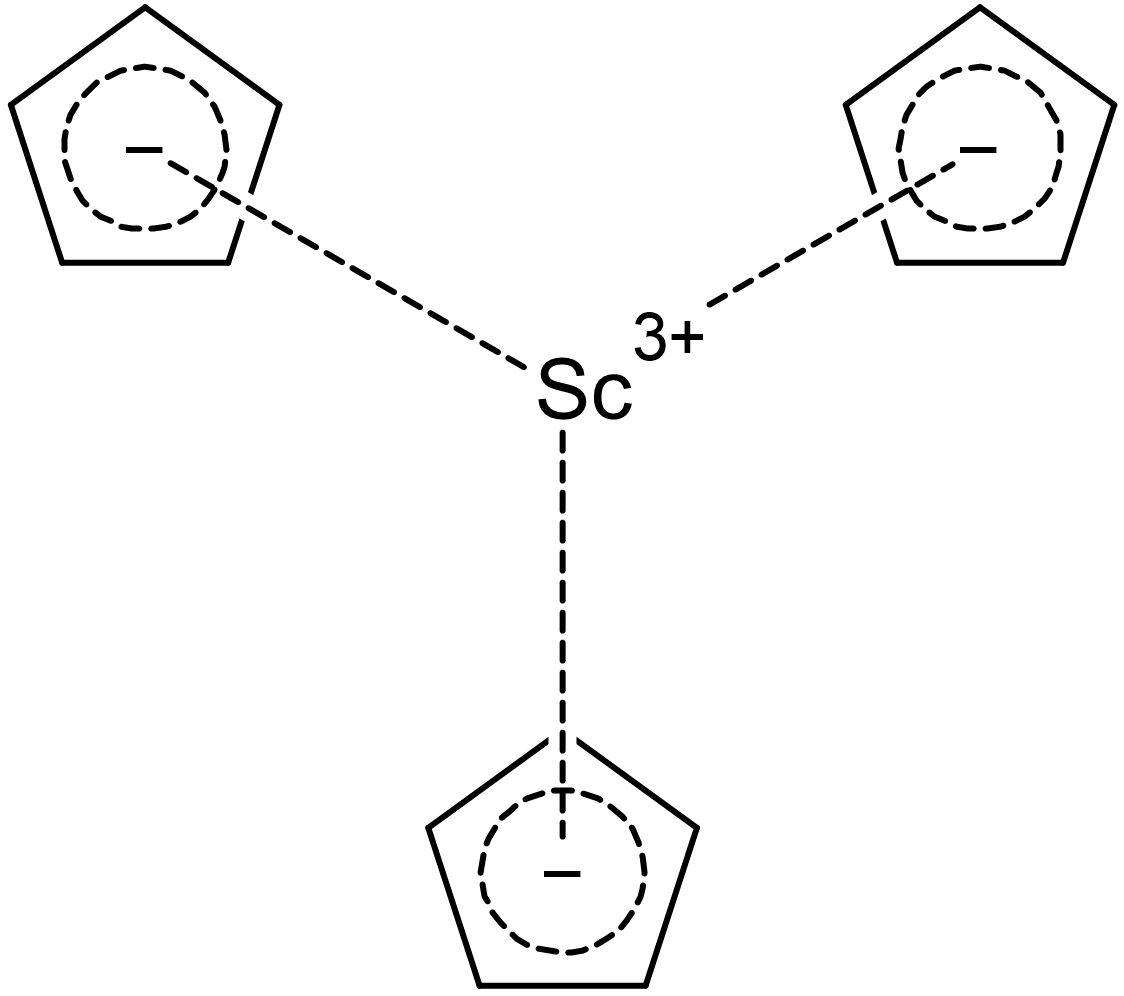

Identifiers
CAS Number	1298-54-0
3D model (JSmol)	Interactive image
ECHA InfoCard	100.013.704
EC Number	215-074-1
PubChem CID	49868187
CompTox Dashboard (EPA)	DTXSID10926500
- InChI: InChI=1S/3C5H5.Sc/c3*1-2-4-5-3-1;/h3*1-5H;/q3*-1;+3 Key: DLIOSYYYCBMDCP-UHFFFAOYSA-N
- SMILES: c1ccc[cH-]1.c2ccc[cH-]2.c3ccc[cH-]3.[Sc+3]

Properties
Chemical formula	C_{15}H_{15}Sc
Molar mass	240.241 g·mol^{−1}
Melting point	240 °C (513 K)
- Except where otherwise noted, data are given for materials in their standard state (at 25 °C [77 °F], 100 kPa). Infobox references

Scandocene is an organoscandium compound with the chemical formula Sc(C_{5}H_{5})_{3}. It is a straw-colored crystal and can be obtained by reacting anhydrous scandium(III) chloride and sodium cyclopentadienide in tetrahydrofuran. If scandium(III) fluoride and magnesocene are reacted as raw materials, a mixture of scandium(III) fluoride and scandocene will be obtained. It decomposes when exposed to water to produce cyclopentadiene and scandium(III) hydroxide.
