= Yttrocene =

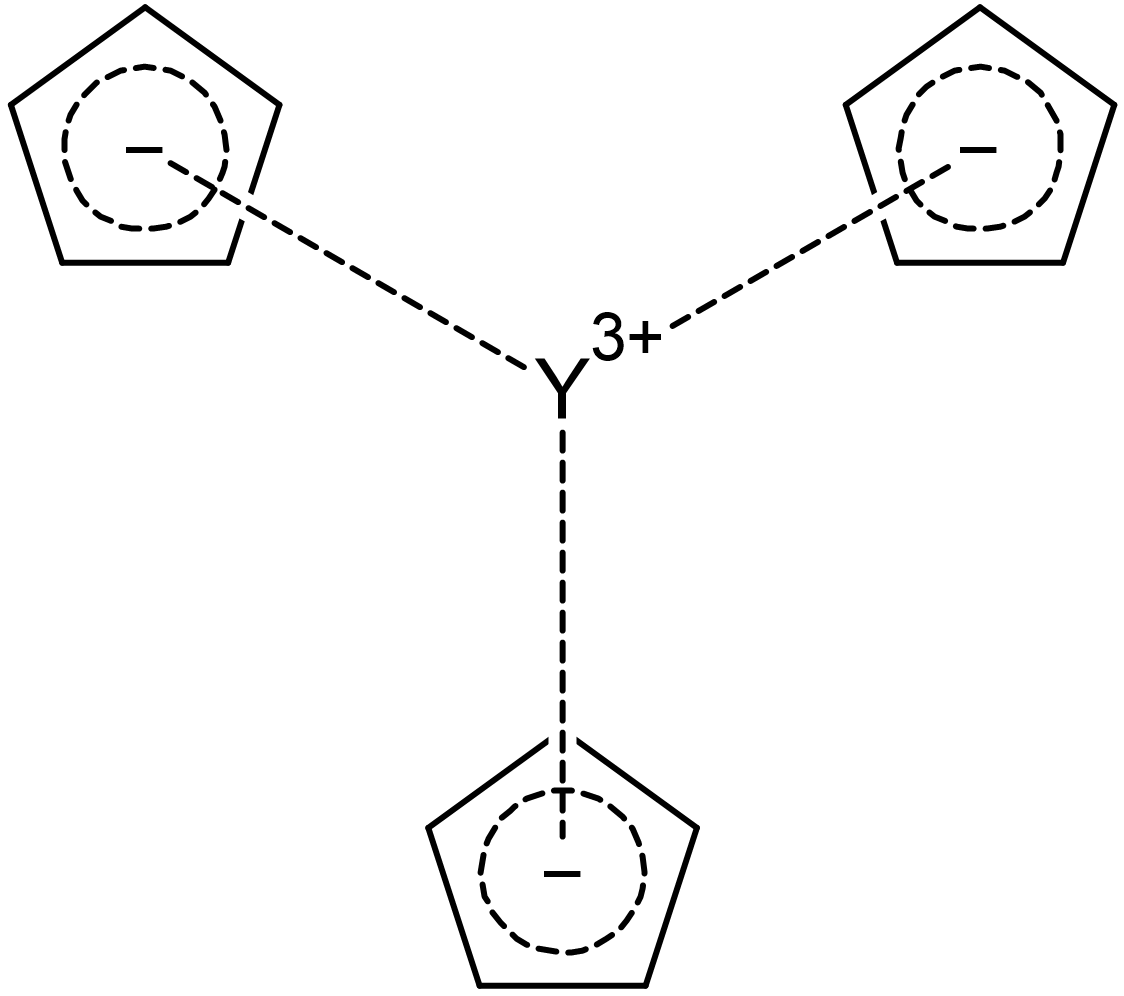

Identifiers
CAS Number	1294-07-1
3D model (JSmol)	Interactive image
- InChI: InChI=1S/3C5H5.Y/c3*1-2-4-5-3-1;/h3*1-5H;/q3*-1;+3 Key: OLQIFTSPAVIXCQ-UHFFFAOYSA-N
- SMILES: c1ccc[cH-]1.c2ccc[cH-]2.c3ccc[cH-]3.[Y+3]

Properties
Chemical formula	C_{15}H_{15}Y
Molar mass	284.191 g·mol^{−1}
Melting point	295 °C (568 K)
- Except where otherwise noted, data are given for materials in their standard state (at 25 °C [77 °F], 100 kPa). Infobox references

Yttrocene is an organoyttrium compound with the chemical formula Y(C_{5}H_{5})_{3}. It forms light yellow crystals and can be obtained by reacting anhydrous yttrium(III) chloride and sodium cyclopentadienide in tetrahydrofuran. It decomposes when exposed to water to produce cyclopentadiene and yttrium(III) hydroxide. Its thermal stability is between ferrocene and other 3D transition metal tricene complexes.
