= Polysilane =

General repeating unit of polysilanes, where the R's are the same or different organic groups.

Polysilanes are organosilicon compounds with the formula (R_{2}Si)_{n}. They are relatives of traditional organic polymers but their backbones are composed of silicon atoms. They exhibit distinctive optical and electrical properties. They are mainly used as precursors to silicon carbide. The simplest polysilane would be (SiH_{2})_{n}, which is mainly of theoretical, not practical interest.

== Synthesis ==
Dodecamethylcyclohexasilane shares some properties of high molecular weight polysilanes.

The first polysilane, poly(dimethylsilylene), [(CH_{3})_{2}Si]_{x}, was reported in 1949 by Charles A. Burkhard (1916 - 1991) of General Electric. It was prepared by heating sodium metal with dimethyldichlorosilane:

(CH_{3})_{2}SiCl_{2} + 2 Na → [(CH_{3})_{2}Si]_{n} + 2 NaCl

The modified Wurtz coupling of dichlorosilanes remains a viable and general route to high molecular weight, linear polysilane derivatives. This reaction is conducted at elevated temperature in an inert solvent using a dispersion of the alkali metal. The polymerization stops with the addition of an alcohol. The major limitation with the Wurtz-type polymerization is that the substituents must tolerate the vigorous reaction conditions. The reaction works well for methyl, benzyl, and phenyl substituents. With the rigorous conditions, the yield of the product ranges from a few percent to approximately 50%. Similarly, potassium-graphite (KC_{8}) can be used at much lower temperatures than those required for traditional Wurtz coupling. This reaction typically produces a trimodal distribution of products: a low molecular weight fraction and two higher molecular weight fractions. The low molecular weight fraction consists of five and six-membered rings, i. e. [SiR_{2}]_{5} and [SiR_{2}]_{6}. Formation of these rings competes with the growth of the polymer. Another method for the synthesis of polysilanes is dehydrogenative coupling of silanes.

== Properties ==
The product obtained by Burkhard was difficult to work because it was insoluble in organic solvents. Interest in the polysilanes resumed in the early 1980s when it was reported that [(CH_{3})_{2}Si]_{x} can be converted to silicon carbide by thermolysis.

Polysilanes range from highly crystalline (and generally insoluble) to amorphous materials, which are more soluble in organic solvents. Decreasing the symmetry and lengthening the organic substituents lowers the crystallinity. Many polysilanes are rubbery elastomers. When doped with oxidizing agents (SbF_{5}, iodine, FeCl_{3}, ferrocinium), the polymers become semiconductors. Most are stable to nearly 300 °C and, in contrast to the polysilicon hydrides, are inert to oxygen at normal temperatures. They are not easily hydrolyzed. Polysilanes exhibit photoconductivity, although degrade when exposed to ultraviolet light. The hydrogen atoms of the higher-dimensional polysilicon hydrides may also be substituted with organic side-groups to give random network organosilicon polymers but these retain the polysilyne base name, for example, as in polymethylsilyne. ^{29}Si NMR spectroscopy provides insights into the microstructure of a polymer. If resonances are broad, oligomerization is likely; if they are sharp, some sort of pattern in the silicon backbone can be inferred.

=== Thermolysis to silicon carbide ===
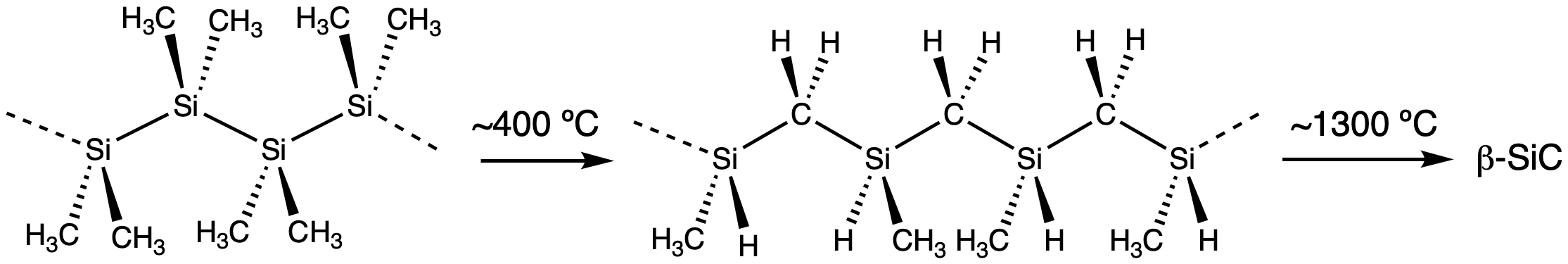
idealized scheme for conversion of polydimethylsilane to beta-silicon carbide.

Yajima and coworkers discovered that the pyrolysis of [Me_{2}Si]_{n} leads to the formation of SiC fibers. This transformation has kindled research on polysilanes and their derivatives. As preceramic polymers, polycarbosilanes can be used to produce dense silicon carbide and silicon oxycarbide through pyrolysis in inert atmospheres. Photopolymerisation of modified polysilanes in stereolithography followed by ceramization is an emerging route towards the additive manufacturing of ceramics.

=== Spectroscopic characteristics and band structure ===
Polysilanes exhibit σ-delocalization. This characteristic stems from the low ionization energy for electrons in Si-Si sigma bonds relative to that of C-C sigma bonds, for instance. Accordingly, they absorb strongly in the UV-region (300-400 nm) due to intense σ-σ* electronic transitions.6 Polysilanes degrade in the presence of UV light since σ-σ* electronic transitions can be thought of as bonds breaking, often precluding some applications. Dialkyl polysilanes tend to have a band gap of about 4.5 eV. Introduction of an aryl substituent to each silicon lowers the band gap to about 3.5 eV, making for a borderline semiconductor.

== Polysilynes ==
Polysilynes are a related class of organosilicon compounds with the formula (RSi)_{n} (R = alkyl). They are more highly cross linked than polysilanes and have been less studied.

== See also ==
- Polysilicon halide
- Polysiloxanes - with oxygen intercalated between silicon atoms
