= Hartha =

- Town
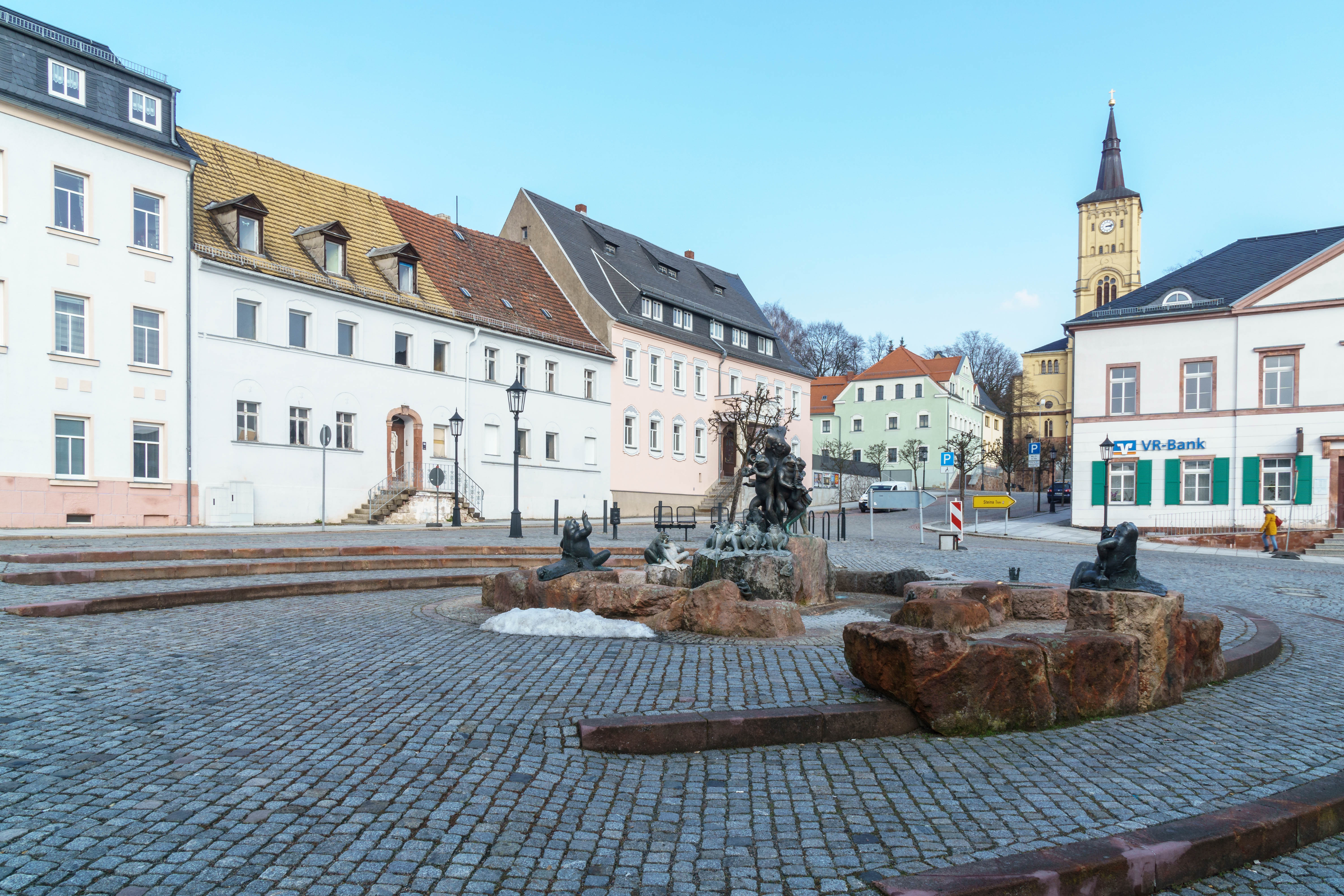
- Main square of Hartha

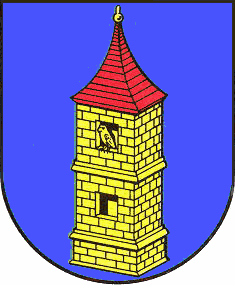
- Coat of arms

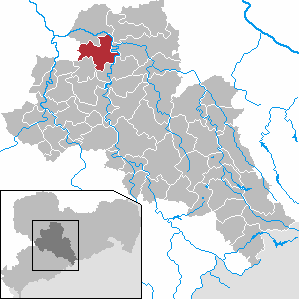
- Location of Hartha within Mittelsachsen district
- Interactive map of Hartha
- Location within Germany Location within Saxony
- Coordinates: 51°5.868′N 12°58.638′E
- Country: Germany
- State: Saxony
- District: Mittelsachsen

Government
  - Mayor (2022–29): Ronald Kunze

Area
  - Total: 54.4 km^{2} (21.0 sq mi)
- Elevation: 326 m (1,070 ft)

Population (2025-12-31)
  - Total: 6,402
  - Density: 118/km^{2} (305/sq mi)
- Time zone: UTC+01:00 (CET)
  - Summer (DST): UTC+02:00 (CEST)
- Postal codes: 04746
- Dialling codes: 034328
- Vehicle registration: FG
- Website: www.hartha.de

Hartha (German pronunciation: [ˈhaʁta]) is a town in the district of Mittelsachsen, in Saxony, Germany. It is situated 11 km west of Döbeln, and 12 km north of Mittweida.

== Personalities ==
- Carl Grünberg (1847–1906), woven goods manufacturer in Hartha and politician (SPD), MdR, MdL (Kingdom of Saxony)
- Hans Jahn (1885–1960), politician of the Social Democratic Party of Germany, trade unionist and resistance fighter against the National Socialism
- Richard Müller (chemist) (1903–1999), chemist, discoverer of the silicone, Müller-Rochow synthesis
