= Dehydrogenative coupling of silanes =

The general reaction for dehydrogenative coupling of primary silanes.

The dehydrogenative coupling of silanes is a reaction type for the formation of Si-Si bonds. Although never commercialized, the reaction has been demonstrated for the synthesis of certain disilanes as well as polysilanes. These reactions generally require catalysts.

== Metallocene-based catalysts ==
Titanocene and related their complexes are typical catalysts. A typical reaction involves phenylsilane:

n PhSiH_{3} → [PhSiH]_{n} + n H_{2}

Para- and meta-substituted phenylsilanes polymerize readily but ortho-substituted polymers were failed to form. Polymers white/colorless, tacky and soluble in organic solvents. Crosslinking was not observed.

Using Cp_{2}Ti(OPh)_{2} as a catalyst, the dehydrogenative coupling of phenylsilane in the presence of vinyltriethoxysilane produces a polysilane terminated with a triethoxysilylvinyl group.

=== Other catalysts ===
The nickel(I) complex [(dippe)Ni(μ-H)]_{2} promotes the dehydrogenative coupling of some silanes. While catalysts for dehydrogenative coupling reactions generally tend to be transition metal complexes, magnesium oxide and calcium oxide promote the dehydrogenation of phenylsilane. Being a heterogeneous process, the products are easily separated from the catalyst. Dehydrogenative coupling of primary silanes using Wilkinson's catalyst is slow and dependent on the removal of H_{2} product. This conversion proceeds by oxidative addition of the Si-H bond and elimination of dihydrogen. Tris(pentafluorophenyl)borane (B(C_{6}F_{5})_{3})) is yet another catalyst for the dehydrogenative coupling of tertiary silanes. This system has the useful characteristic of being selective for Si-H bonds vs Si-Si bonds, leading to fewer branches and more linear polymers. This catalyst is particularly useful in reactions involving thiols and tertiary silanes or disilanes.

== Related reactions of hydrosilanes ==
As well as being coupled to each other, tertiary silanes can be coupled with carboxylic acids to form silyl esters. Ru_{3}(CO)_{12}/EtI is a good catalyst for this. This reaction applies to a wide range of silanes and acids. The complex [Cu(PPh_{3})_{3}Cl] can also be used to produce silyl esters.

Tertiary silanes may also be dehydrogenatively coupled to aromatic rings with the use of the catalyst Tp^{Me2}Pt(Me)_{2}H (Tp^{Me2} = hydrido tris(3,5-dimethylpyrazolyl)borate). For example, this platinum catalyst can be used to react triethyl silane with benzene to produce phenyltriethylsilane, with the elimination of hydrogen gas. This is a terrific catalyst because it eliminates the need for a hydrogen acceptor, something which is normally required for the silation of a C-H bond. This reaction may also be done intramolecularly to produce five- or six-membered silicon-containing rings fused to a phenyl ring. In addition, tributylsilane can be converted into the corresponding cyclic organosilane via the same process. A drawback to this catalyst, however, is that it requires rather harsh reaction conditions (typically 200 °C for 24 hours for the intermolecular reaction, 48 – 72 hours for the intramolecular ones). It is also not particularly regioselective, so starting materials containing substituted benzene would result in a mixture of products.

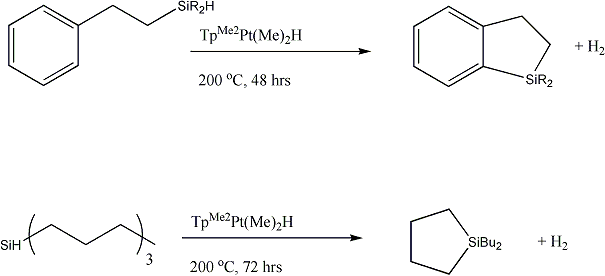
Examples of intramolecular Si-C coupling reactions

=== Polymerization of silane ===
Some methods used to produce polysilanes are polymerization of masked dislenes, electroreduction of dichlorosilanes,

== Polymer characterization ==
^{1}H and ^{29}Si NMR spectroscopy can sometimes be used to help identify and characterize products from these reactions.

Infrared spectroscopy may also be useful as it can indicate whether or not the product is a tertiary silane. The stretch for Si-H is seen at around 2100 and 910 cm^{−1}. In the case of tertiary silanes however, the peak at 910 cm^{−1} is not seen. The shift or change in these peaks will be affected by the size of the polymer.
