= Organoscandium chemistry =

Chemistry of compounds containing a carbon to scandium chemical bond

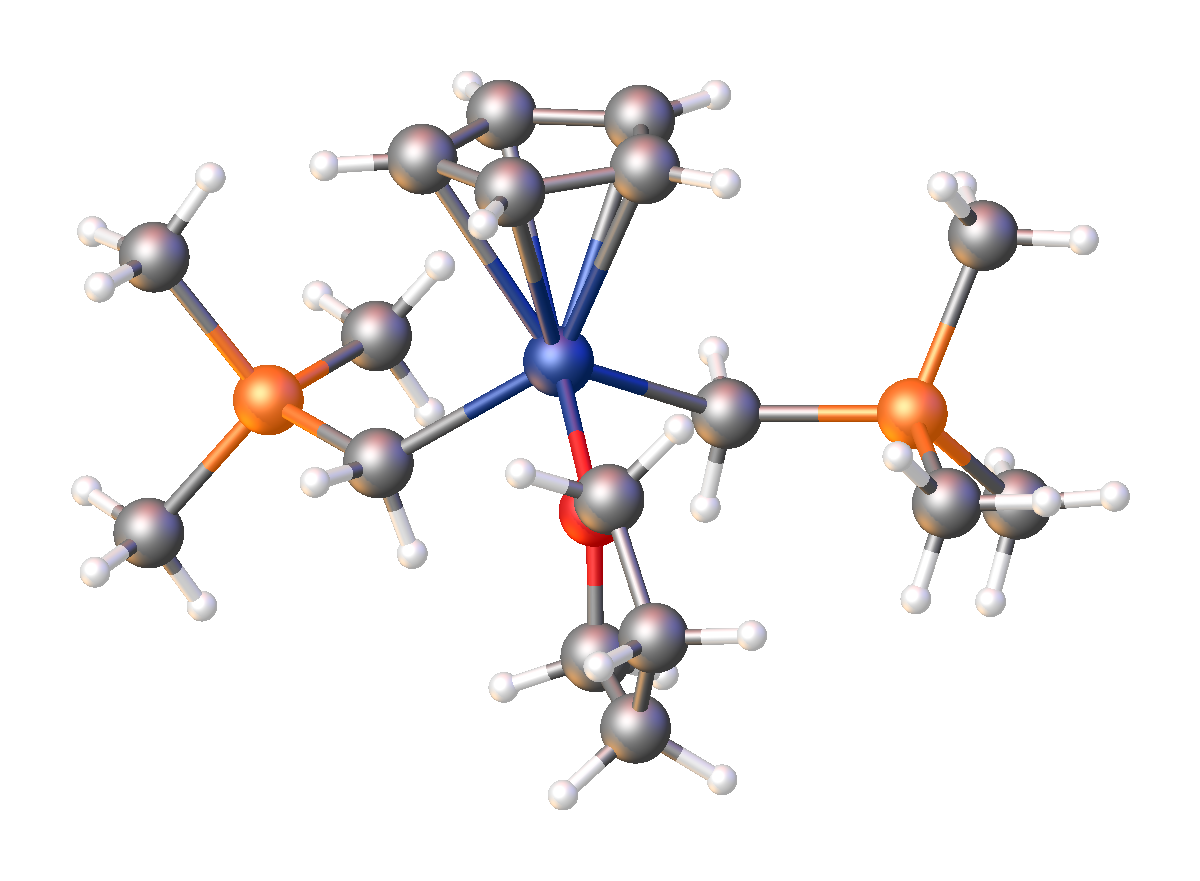
Structure of (C_{5}H_{5})Sc(CH_{2}tms)_{2}(thf) (tms = Si(CH_{3})_{3}, thf = tetrahydrofuran).

Organoscandium chemistry is an area with organometallic compounds focused on compounds with at least one carbon to scandium chemical bond. The interest in organoscandium compounds is mostly academic but motivated by potential practical applications in catalysis, especially in polymerization. A common precursor is scandium chloride, especially its THF complex.

As with the other elements in group 3 – e.g. yttrium, forming organoyttrium compounds – and the lanthanides, the dominant oxidation state for scandium in organometallic compounds is +3 (electron configuration [Ar] 3d^{1}4s^{2}). The members of this group also have large ionic radii with vacant s,p and d orbitals (88 pm for Sc^{3+} compared to 67 pm for Al^{3+}) and as a result they behave as hard Lewis acids and tend to have high coordination numbers of 9 to 12. The metal to ligand chemical bond is largely ionic.

== Illustrative complexes ==
=== Sc(III) derivatives ===
Many organoscandium(III) compounds have at least one cyclopentadienyl-type ligand. The reaction of scandium trichloride with two equivalents of sodium cyclopentadienide (NaCp) produces the chloride-bridged dimer:

2 ScCl_{3} + 4 NaCp → [Cp_{2}Sc(μ-Cl)]_{2} + 4 NaCl

Cp_{3}Sc is a polymer wherein one third of the Cp ligands serving as bridging ligands.

Bulkier cyclopentadienide ligands give monoscandium derivatives, e.g. (C_{5}Me_{5})_{2}ScCl. The corresponding alkyls polymerize alkenes.

The synthesis of a tris(allyl)scandium complex is analogous to the above methods, involving the reaction of ScCl_{3} with allyl potassium in THF solution, The product is Sc(C_{3}H_{5})_{3}(THF)_{2} wherein two allyl ligands are η^{3} coordinated and one allyl ligand is η^{1}.

=== Sc(II) and Sc(I) derivatives ===
Organoscandium compounds in lower oxidation states have been prepared.
