= Dodecamethylcyclohexasilane =

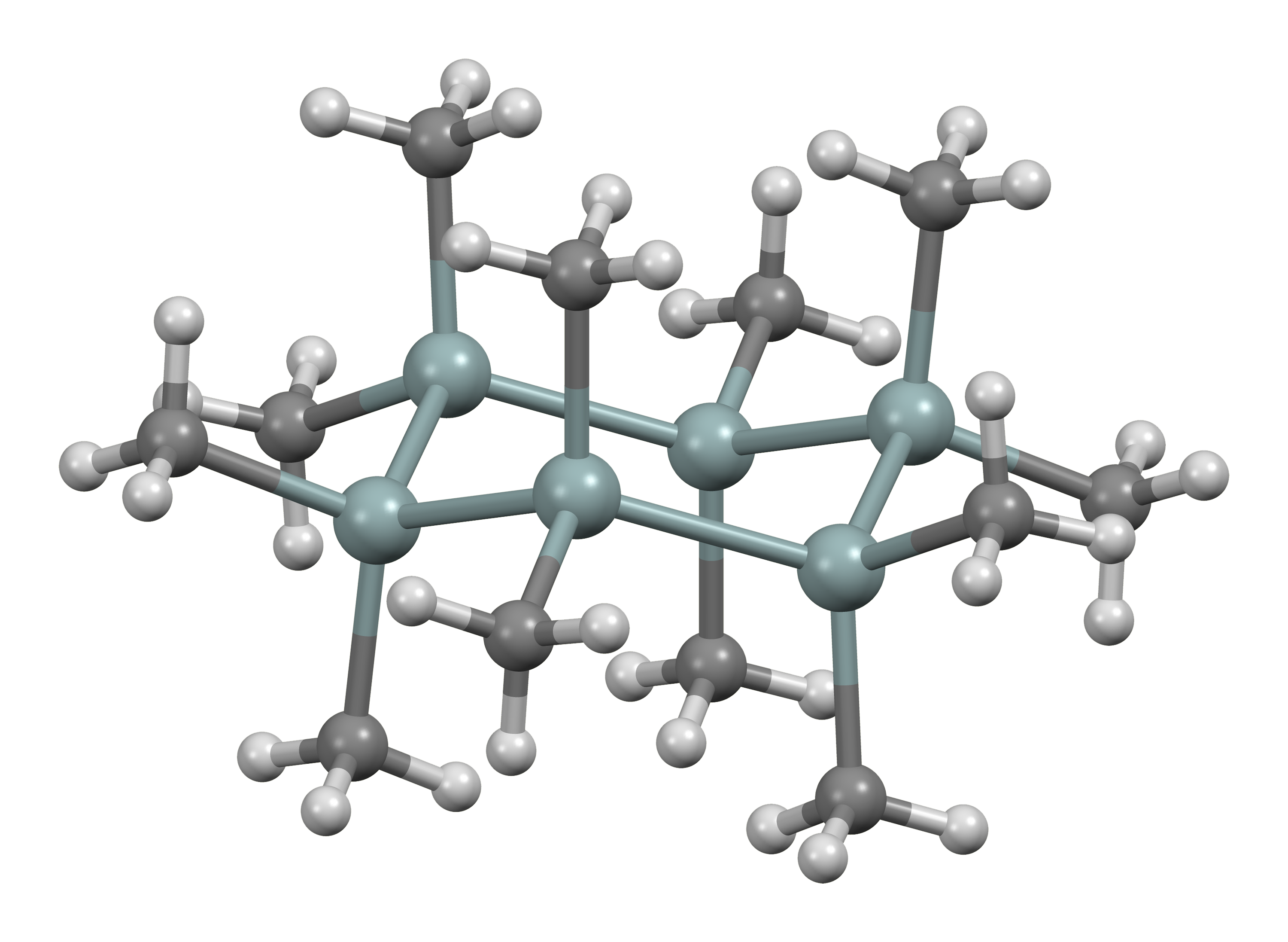

Names
- IUPAC name 1,1,2,2,3,3,4,4,5,5,6,6-dodecamethylhexasilinane

Identifiers
CAS Number	4098-30-0
3D model (JSmol)	Interactive image
ChemSpider	70132
ECHA InfoCard	100.021.691
EC Number	223-860-0
PubChem CID	77732
UNII	22T5C2K67D
CompTox Dashboard (EPA)	DTXSID9063297
- InChI: InChI=1S/C12H36Si6/c1-13(2)14(3,4)16(7,8)18(11,12)17(9,10)15(13,5)6/h1-12H3 Key: RTCLHEHPUHREBC-UHFFFAOYSA-N
- SMILES: C[Si]1([Si]([Si]([Si]([Si]([Si]1(C)C)(C)C)(C)C)(C)C)(C)C)C

Properties
Chemical formula	Si_{6}(CH_{3})_{12}
Molar mass	348.930 g·mol^{−1}
Appearance	colorless solid
Density	0.988 g/cm^{3}
Melting point	254–257 °C (489–495 °F; 527–530 K)
- Except where otherwise noted, data are given for materials in their standard state (at 25 °C [77 °F], 100 kPa). Infobox references

Dodecamethylcyclohexasilane is the organosilicon compound with the formula Si_{6}(CH_{3})_{12}. It is one of the more readily prepared and easily handled polysilanes. Dodecamethylcyclohexasilane is produced by reduction of dimethyldichlorosilane with sodium–potassium alloy:

6 (CH_{3})_{2}SiCl_{2} + 12 M → Si_{6}(CH_{3})_{12} + 12 MCl

where M is Na or K. The reaction also produces a polymer poly(dimethylsilylene) [−Si(CH_{3})_{2}−]_{n} and a cyclic compound decamethylcyclopentasilane Si_{5}(CH_{3})_{10}.

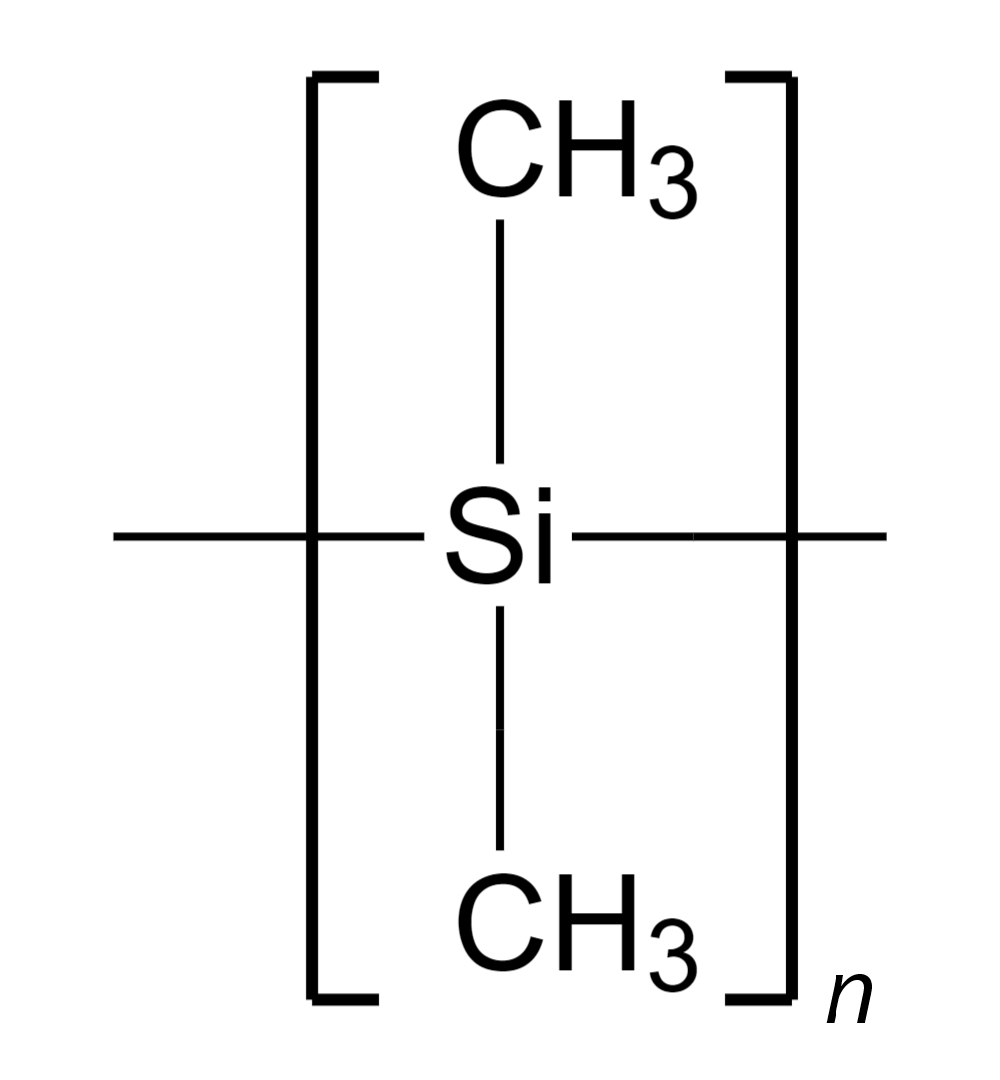
Poly(dimethylsilylene), a polymer

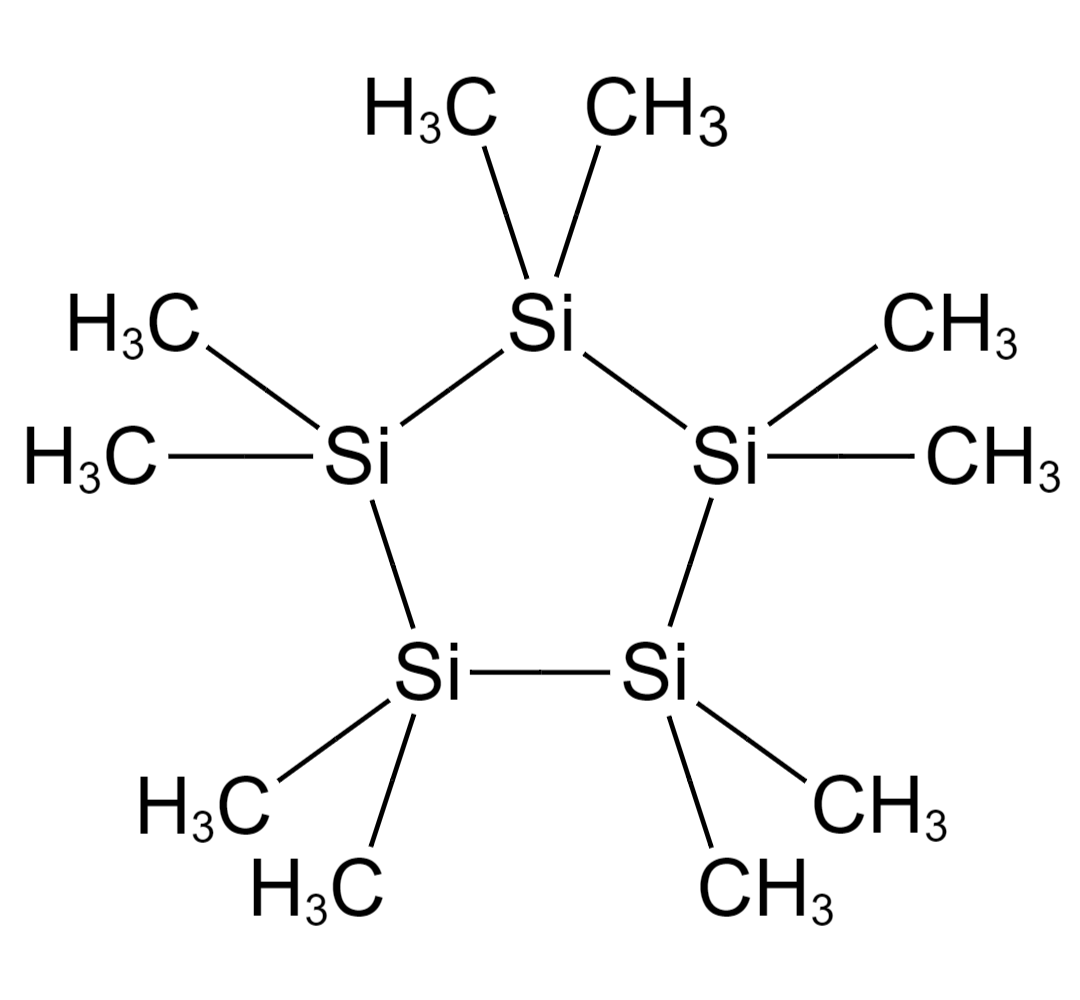
Decamethylcyclopentasilane, a cyclic compound

The chair conformer of dodecamethylcyclohexasilane was confirmed by X-ray crystallography.

== Reactions ==
Dodecamethylcyclohexasilane reacts with potassium tert-butoxide to give the potassium derivative:

(CH_{3})_{12}Si_{6} + KOC(CH_{3})_{3} → K(CH_{3})_{11}Si_{6} + CH_{3}OC(CH_{3})_{3}
