= Organotechnetium chemistry =

Organotechnetium chemistry is the science of describing the physical properties, synthesis, and reactions of organotechnetium compounds, which are organometallic compounds containing carbon-to-technetium chemical bonds. The most common organotechnetium compounds are coordination complexes used as radiopharmaceutical imaging agents.

In general, organotechnetium compounds are not typically used in chemical reactions or catalysis due to their radioactivity. Research on technetium chemistry is often done in conjunction with rhenium as a isoelectronic non-radioactive alternative to technetium.

== Brief history ==
Technetium were first used as a radiopharmaceutical in 1961. Of the radiopharmaceuticals in clinical use for SPECT (single photon emission computed tomography), a majority of the compounds are ^{99m}Tc complexes. Three generations of technetium radiopharmaceuticals currently exist and are used. The first generation do not localize specifically and are considered perfusion agents. Second generation has a peptide based targeting portion. The third generation of technetium radiopharmaceuticals features organotechnetium compounds that can localize in the body in a biomimetic manner.

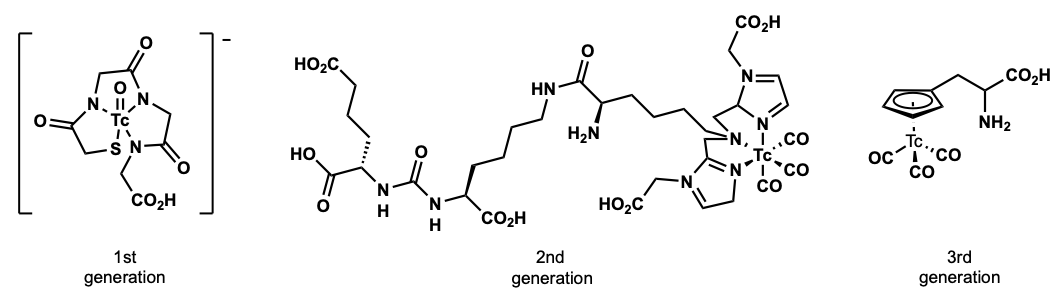
Generations of technetium radio-pharmaceuticals

== Examples ==
A vast majority of technetium compounds used in radiopharmaceutical imaging and diagnosis are inorganic coordination complexes. There are a number of “classical” organometallic organotechnetium compounds, specifically containing carbon-technetium bonds are in clinical use. These organotechnetium compounds are mostly seen as technetium tri-carbonyl compounds and technetium cyclopentadienyl compounds.

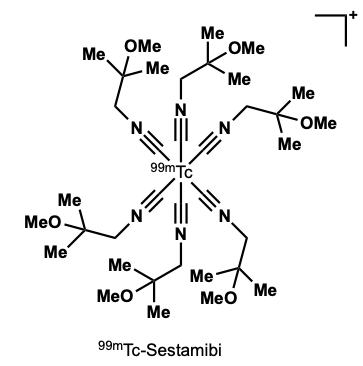
99mTc-Sestamibi

One of the most prominent radio pharmaceutical compounds in clinical use is Cardiolie^{®}, also known as ^{99m}Tc-Sestamibi. This organotechnetium compound is applied for myocardial imaging. The d^{6} electron configuration is highly stable due to its low oxidation state. The Tc(I) complex is further stabilized by the high reducing potential of the isonitrile ligands.

The above piano-stool organotechnetium complex is a third generation radiopharmaceutical. The cyclopentadienyl ligand acts as a bio isostere to a phenyl group in the amino acid phenylalanine.

== Synthesis ==
Radioactive ^{99m}Tc is obtained in the pertechnetate form in dilute aqueous solution from ^{99}Mo/^{99m}Tc generators. Pertechnetate can then be made into more useful carbonyl and hydrate precursors for subsequent synthesis into technetate complexes.

As the starting radiometals are most available in aqueous solution due to method of isolation, the chemistry for synthesis of technetate compounds must be done in aqueous solution.

The study of technetium compounds is typically done in conjugation with rhenium as an isoelectronic and non-radioactive alternative to technetium.

=== Precursors ===
For ^{99m}Tc and ^{188}Re, the synthesis of compounds start with pertechnetate or perrhenate in saline at low concentration, obtained from ^{99}Mo/^{99m}Tc and ^{188}W/^{188}Re generators. The aquo tricarbonyl precursors are useful for accessing Tc and Re complexes. The metals have d^{6} low-spin electronic configuration, providing high kinetic stability, and highly stable M-C bonds. Consequently, the three CO ligands always remain coordinated, while ligands readily replace the three water molecules. Typical organotechnetium compounds thus feature the tricarbonyl motif.

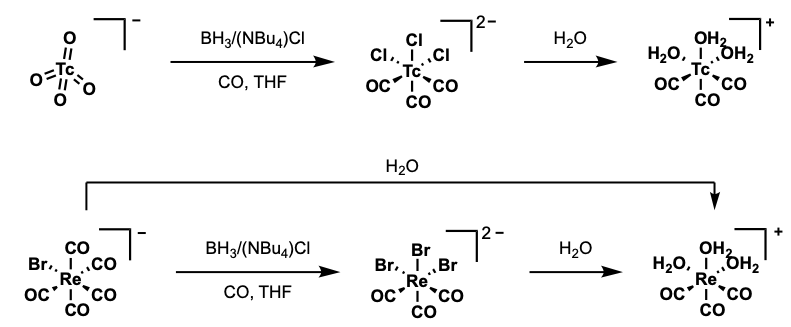
Technetium and Rhenium precursors

Typical methods of organometallic compounds synthesis difficult to utilize. To be useful as a radiopharmaceutical, the reaction should be done in an aqueous saline solution that can be injected into the body intravenously.

=== Double Ligand Transfer ===
A double ligand transfer (DLT) reaction was developed by Martin Wenzel for synthesis of organotechnetium/organorhenium complexes. The reaction features the synthesis of organotechnetium piano-stool compounds from ferrocene. The reaction was further studied and optimized by Katzenellegbogen. Unfortunately, the utility of this method in the synthesis of radiopharmaceuticals is limited by the use of organic solvent.

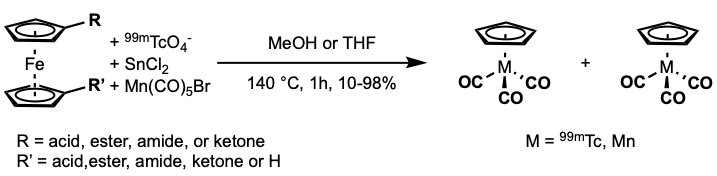
Wenzel double-ligand-transfer

==== Mechanism ====
This mechanism is proposed to proceed by ring slippage. First, reduction and carbonylation of the pertechnetate/perrhenate with CrCl_{3} and/or Cr(CO)_{6} to form the 6 coordinate intermediate. Subsequent reaction with the substituted ferrocene through ring-slipped, bridged intermediates then gives product. The transfer of the more electron deficient ring is favored by the stabilization of the transition state of η^{5}- η^{3} ring slip of ferrocene.

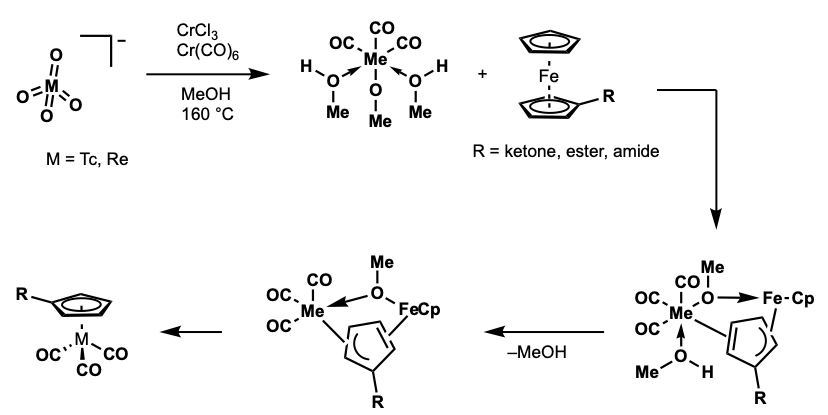
Double-ligand-transfer mechanism

=== Metal-Mediated Retro Diels-Alder ===
Aqueous synthesis enables development for medically relevant radiopharmaceuticals. First aqueous synthesis of fac-[^{99m}Tc(η^{5} -Cp-C(O)CH_{3})(CO)_{3}] was described by the Alberto lab utilized a metal-mediated retro Diels-Alder to synthesize the organotechnetium complexes.

==== Mechanism ====
In a step-wise manner, the carboxylate first coordinates to technetium followed by coordination to the adjacent cyclopentadiene (Path A). The reaction is thermodynamically driven, given a strong electronic interaction between [^{99m}Tc(CO)_{3}]^{+} and the cyclopentadiene.

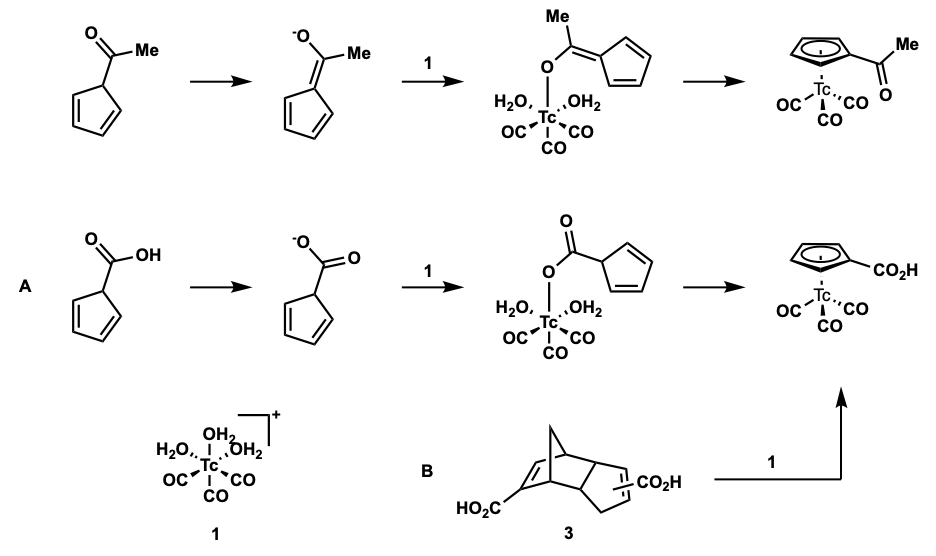

The favorable formation of the {(η^{5}-Cp)Tc} as a driving force for formation of the product 2, prompted the use of the Diels-Ader dimer (HCp-COOH)_{2} (Thiele’s acid) as a precursor to the cyclopentadiene. Thermal cracking of 3 typically requires T >160 °C. Reaction of 3 and 1 at 95 °C for 30 min in buffer gave quantitative formation of 2. As no free HCp-COOH was observed, in situ retro Diels-Alder and subsequent entry into path A was excluded.

==== Examples ====
The metal-mediated retro Diels-Alder reaction suggests a general approach to [(Cp-R)^{99m}Tc(CO)_{3}], enable access to a variety of R groups on the Cp ring.

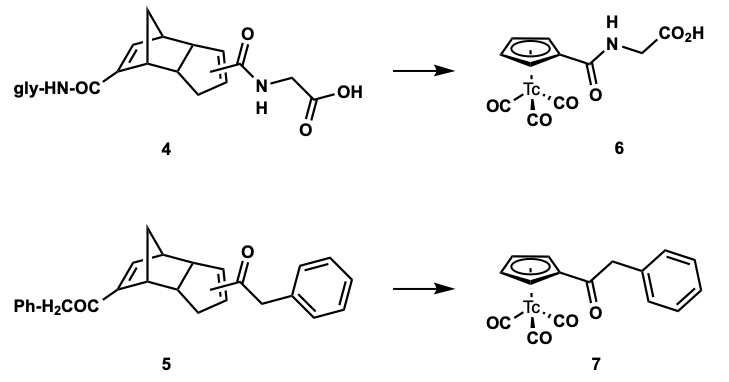
Alberto retro-diels-alder examples

With the development by the Alberto lab of this retro-Diels–Alder method for synthesizing ^{99m}Tc and Re complexes in aqueous media, the labeling of biomolecules with piano-stool-like complexes is now possible, enabling access to the development of new radiopharmaceuticals.

== Reactivity ==
Technetium has been shown to react similarity to osmium. Able to catalyze a cis dihydroxylation.

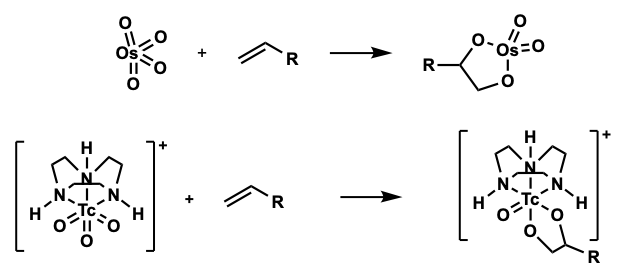
Technetium dihydroxylation
