= Dimethyldichlorosilane =

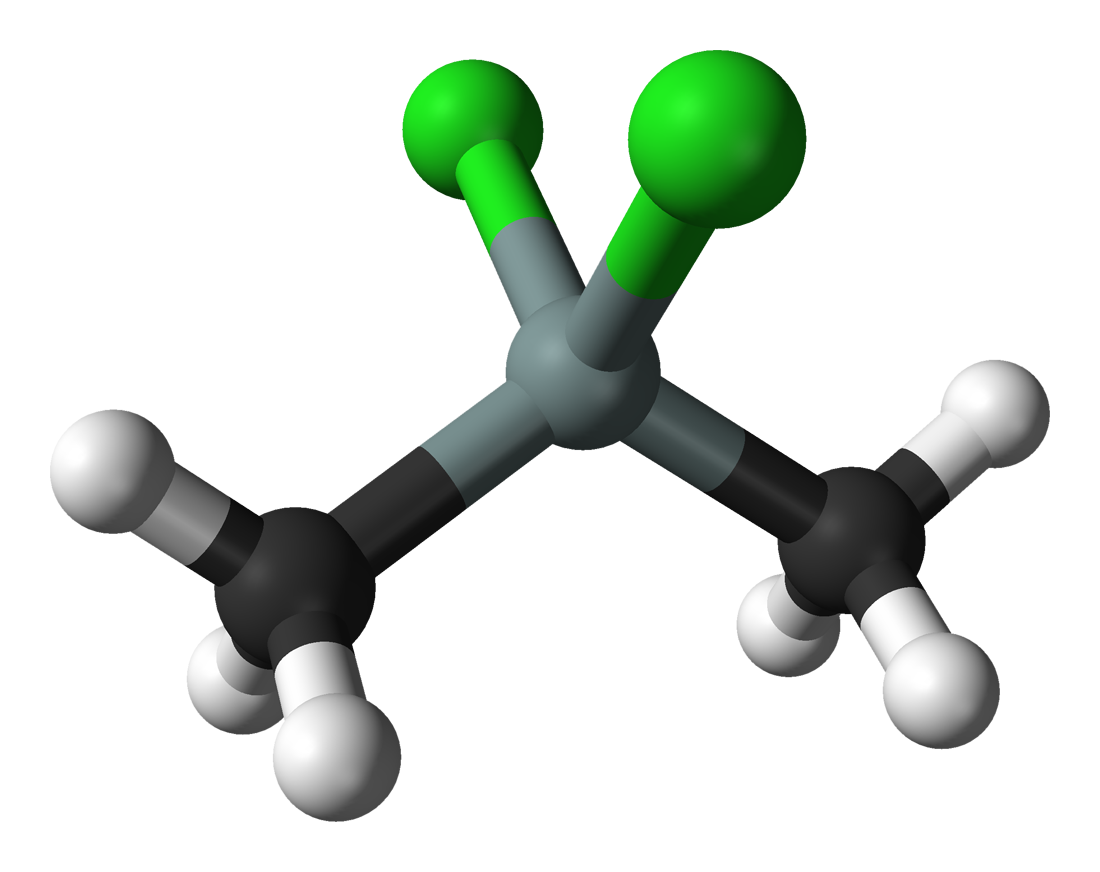

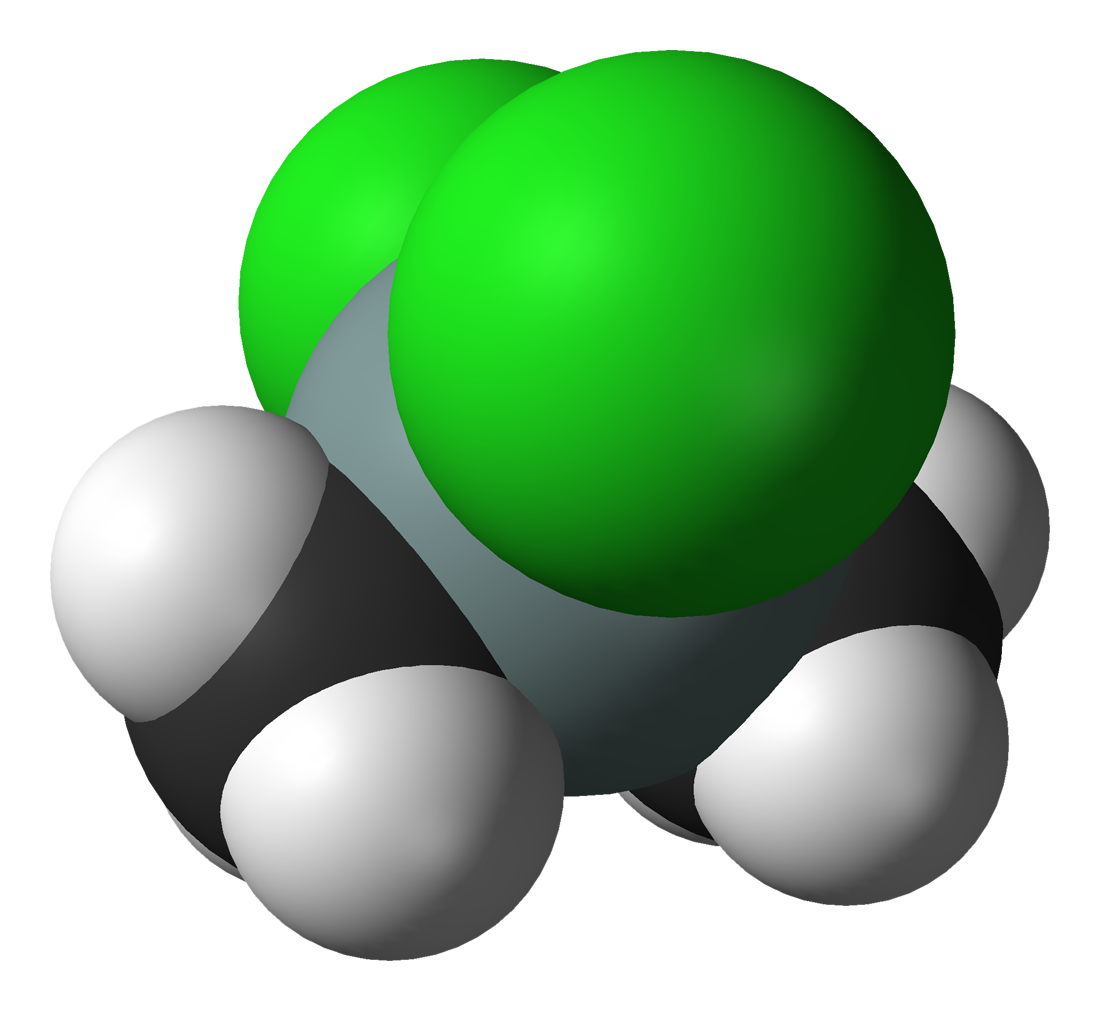

Names
- Preferred IUPAC name Dichlorodi(methyl)silane
- Other names Dichlorodimethylsilane, dichlorodimethylsilicon, dimethylsilicon dichloride, dimethylsilane dichloride, DMDCS

Identifiers
CAS Number	75-78-5
3D model (JSmol)	Interactive image
ChemSpider	6158
ECHA InfoCard	100.000.820
EC Number	200-901-0
PubChem CID	6398
RTECS number	VV3150000
UNII	8TSJ92JX69
UN number	1162
CompTox Dashboard (EPA)	DTXSID9026425
- InChI: InChI=1S/C2H6Cl2Si/c1-5(2,3)4/h1-2H3 Key: LIKFHECYJZWXFJ-UHFFFAOYSA-N; InChI=1/C2H6Cl2Si/c1-5(2,3)4/h1-2H3 Key: LIKFHECYJZWXFJ-UHFFFAOYAT
- SMILES: C[Si](C)(Cl)Cl

Properties
Chemical formula	C_{2}H_{6}Cl_{2}Si
Molar mass	129.06 g·mol^{−1}
Appearance	Colorless liquid
Density	1.07 g·cm^{−3} (l)
Melting point	−76 °C (−105 °F; 197 K)
Boiling point	70 °C (158 °F; 343 K)
Solubility in water	Decomposes

Hazards
- GHS labelling
Pictograms	(GHS02: Flammable) (GHS07: Exclamation mark)
Signal word	Danger
Hazard statements	H225, H315, H319, H335
Precautionary statements	P210, P233, P240, P241, P242, P243, P261, P264, P271, P280, P302+P352, P303+P361+P353, P304+P340, P305+P351+P338, P312, P321, P332+P313, P337+P313, P362, P370+P378, P403+P233, P403+P235, P405, P501
Flash point	−9 °C (16 °F; 264 K)
- Except where otherwise noted, data are given for materials in their standard state (at 25 °C [77 °F], 100 kPa). verify (what is ?) Infobox references

Dimethyldichlorosilane is an organosilicon compound with the formula Si(CH_{3})_{2}Cl_{2}. It is a colorless flammable liquid. Dimethyldichlorosilane is made on an industrial scale as the principal precursor to dimethylsilicone and some polysilanes.

== History ==
Major progress in organosilicon chemistry occurred when Frederick Kipping and his students began experimenting with diorganodichlorosilanes (R_{2}SiCl_{2}). Such compounds were prepared by treating silicon tetrachloride with Grignard reagents. This method, however, suffered from many experimental problems.

In the 1930s, the demand for silicones increased due to the need for better insulators for electric motors and sealing materials for aircraft engines, and with it the need for a more efficient synthesis of dimethyldichlorosilane. To solve the problem, General Electric, Corning Glass Works, and Dow Chemical Company began a partnership that ultimately became the Dow Corning Company. During 1941–1942, Eugene G. Rochow, a chemist from General Electric, and Richard Müller, working independently in Germany, found an alternate synthesis of dimethyldichlorosilane that allowed it to be produced on an industrial scale. This Direct Synthesis, or Direct process, which is used in today’s industry, involves the reaction of elemental silicon with methyl chloride in the presence of a copper catalyst.

== Preparation ==
Rochow's synthesis involved passing methyl chloride through a heated tube packed with ground silicon and copper(I) chloride. The current industrial method places finely ground silicon in a fluidized bed reactor at about 300 °C. The catalyst is applied as Cu_{2}O. Methyl chloride is then passed through the reactor to produce dimethyldichlorosilane:

2 CH_{3}Cl + Si → (CH_{3})_{2}SiCl_{2}

In addition to dimethyldichlorosilane, products of this reaction include CH_{3}SiCl_{3}, CH_{3}SiHCl_{2}, and (CH_{3})_{3}SiCl, which are separated from each other by fractional distillation. The yields and boiling points of these products are shown in the following chart.

Product	Yield (%)	Boiling pt (°C)
(CH_{3})_{2}SiCl_{2}	80–90	70.0
CH_{3}SiCl_{3}	5–15	65.7
CH_{3}SiHCl_{2}	3–5	40.7
(CH_{3})_{3}SiCl	3–5	57.3

== Main reactions ==
Dimethyldichlorosilane hydrolyzes to form linear and cyclic silicones, compounds containing Si-O-Si backbones. The length of the resulting polymer is dependent on the concentration of chain ending groups that are added to the reaction mixture. The rate of the reaction is determined by the transfer of reagents across the aqueous-organic phase boundary; therefore, the reaction is most efficient under turbulent conditions. The reaction medium can be varied further to maximize the yield of a specific product.

n (CH_{3})_{2}SiCl_{2} + n H_{2}O → [Si(CH_{3})_{2}O]_{n} + 2n HCl

Dimethyldichlorosilane reacts with methanol to produce dimethoxydimethylsilanes:

(CH_{3})_{2}SiCl_{2} + 2 CH_{3}OH → (CH_{3})_{2}Si(OCH_{3})_{2} + 2 HCl

Although the hydrolysis of dimethoxydimethylsilanes is slower than that of the dichloride, it is advantageous because it avoids formation of the hydrochloric acid byproduct:

n (CH_{3})_{2}Si(OCH_{3})_{2} + n H_{2}O → [(CH_{3})_{2}SiO]_{n} + 2n CH_{3}OH

Dimethyldichlorosilane also converts to the silylamide when treated with secondary amines:

(CH_{3})_{2}SiCl_{2} + 4 HN(CH_{3})_{2} → (CH_{3})_{2}Si[N(CH_{3})_{2}]_{2} + 2H_{2}N(CH_{3})_{2}Cl

Sodium–potassium alloy reduces dimethyldichlorosilane, producing polysilane chains with a Si-Si backbone. For example, dodecamethylcyclohexasilane can be prepared in this way:

6 (CH_{3})_{2}SiCl_{2} + 12 M → [(CH_{3})_{2}Si]_{6} + 12 MCl (M = Na, K)

The reaction can also produce polydimethylsilane and decamethylpentasilane. Diverse types of dichlorosilane precursors, such as Ph_{2}SiCl_{2}, can be added to adjust the properties of the polymer.

Dimethyldichlorosilane and related compounds react with gem-diols to form cyclic derivatives.

== Applications ==
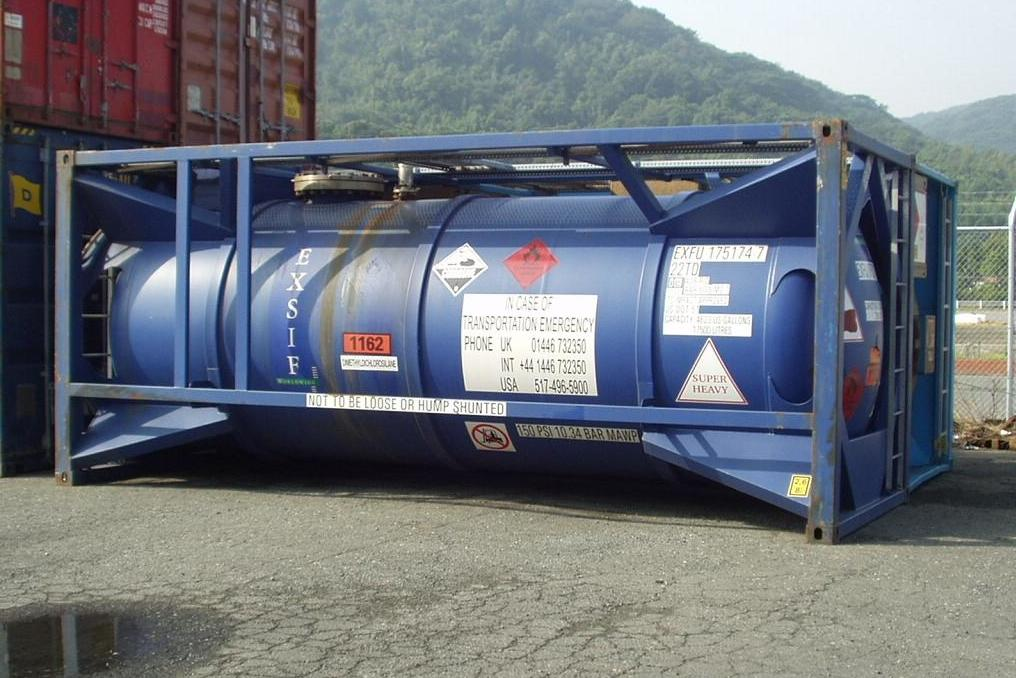
Container with the substance, showing UN number 1162, in Japan.

An ampoule of Dichlorodimethylsilane

The main purpose of dimethyldichlorosilane is for use in the synthesis of silicones, an industry that was valued at more than $10 billion per year in 2005. It is also employed in the production of polysilanes, which in turn are precursors to silicon carbide. In practical uses, dichlorodimethylsilane can be used as a coating on glass to avoid the adsorption of micro-particles.
