= Richard Müller (chemist) =

German chemist (1903–1999)

Richard Gustav Müller
- Born: 17 July 1903; Hartha, German Empire
- Died: 7 July 1999 (aged 95); Radebeul, Germany
- Education: University of Leipzig
- Known for: discovery of Müller-Rochow process
- Scientific career
- Workplaces: Fabrik v. Heyden

Richard Gustav Müller (17 July 1903 – 7 July 1999) was a German chemist. He and Eugene G. Rochow independently discovered the direct process of organosilicon compounds in 1941. That synthesis, also known as the Müller-Rochow process, is the copper-catalysed reaction of chloromethane with silicon. Müller was awarded the National Prize of East Germany in 1952 for his work.

== Career ==
Born in Hartha in the state of Saxony, Müller attended the Volksschule (equivalent to elementary and junior high school) in Hartha and the G.E. Lessing Gymnasium (secondary school) in Döbeln. After studying from 1923 to 1931 at the University of Leipzig, he received his doctorate in chemistry. From 1933 onwards he worked as a laboratory manager at Chemische Fabrik von Heyden, a large chemical plant located in Radebeul and famous as the world's first factory to produce salicylic acid on an industrial scale. During his research there, in 1941 he succeeded in achieving industrial production of methylchlorosilanes, an important feedstock for the production of silicones.

From 1954 to 1972 Müller taught as head of the Institute of Silicone and Fluorocarbon Chemistry at the Dresden University of Technology, where the Faculty of Mathematics and Science, awarded him an honorary doctorate in 1992 “in recognition of outstanding achievements in the field of organosilicon chemistry.” The citation particularly acknowledged his “seminal work on industrially applicable synthesis of methylchlorosilanes, research contributions to the development of silicon organic chemistry and the long years of teaching” at the university.

In 2001, a street in Radebeul was named in honour of Richard Müller.
