= Polysilyne =

Class of silicon polymers with the repeating unit [RSi]

In organosilicon chemistry, polysilynes are chemical compounds with the formula [RSi]_{n}, where R can be hydrogen (e.g. in polysilyne [HSi]_{n}), or organyl (e.g. in poly(methylsilyne)). Although their name suggests a relationship to alkynes (−C≡C−), polysilynes are a class of silicon-based random network polymers primarily composed of tetrahedral silicon atoms, each connected to one hydrogen or carbon and three Si atoms. These compounds are prepared by Wurtz coupling of alkyltrichlorosilanes (RSiCl_{3}):

3 Na + RSiCl_{3} → [RSi]_{n} + 3 NaCl

The methyl and hexyl derivatives have been described. Poly(methylsilyne) (PMSy) [CH_{3}Si]_{n} is a dark yellow powder. With some solvents (tetrahydrofuran, ether, toluene etc.) it forms a colloidal suspension that is clear and non-viscous, which may then be deposited as a film or coating on various substrates.

Poly(methylsilyne) is a preceramic polymer, converting to silicon carbide upon thermolysis in an inert atmosphere. The optical properties of these materials has attracted attention.
