= Phenylsilane =

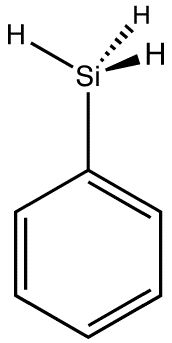
skeletal formula of phenylsilane
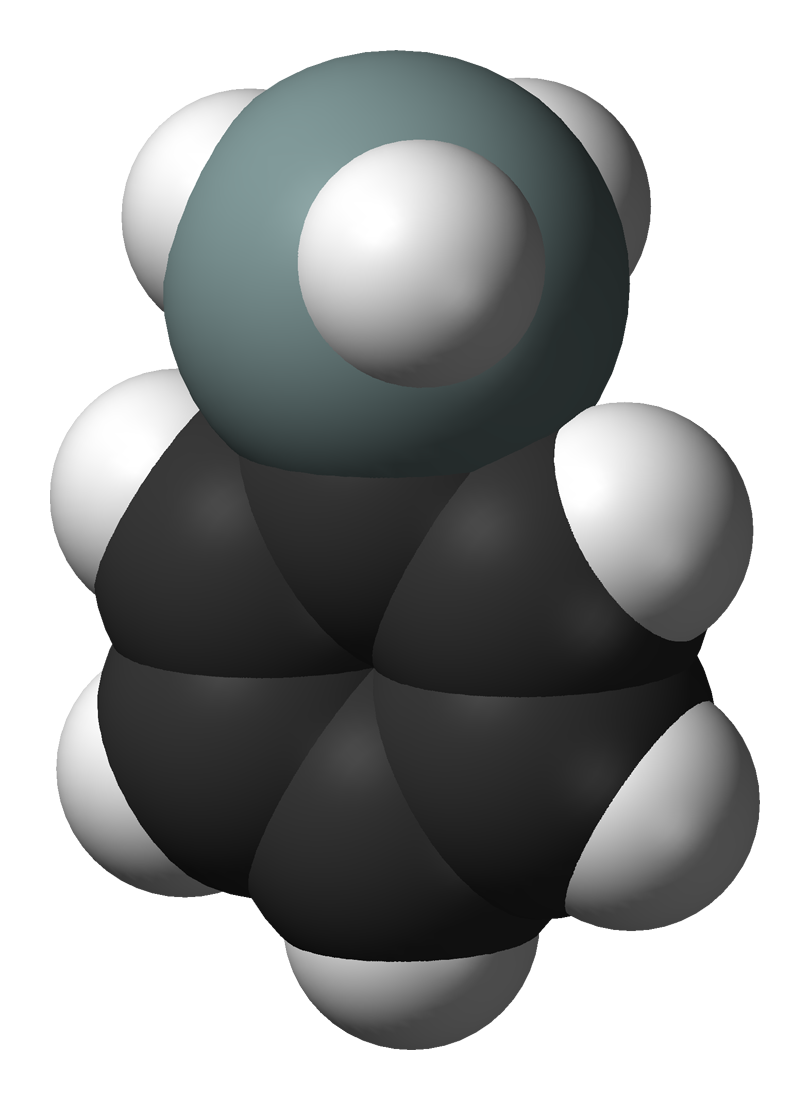
ball-and-stick model of the phenylsilane molecule

Names
- Preferred IUPAC name Phenylsilane
- Other names Silylbenzene

Identifiers
CAS Number	694-53-1
3D model (JSmol)	Interactive image
ChEBI	CHEBI:172874
ChemSpider	12228
ECHA InfoCard	100.010.703
EC Number	211-772-5
PubChem CID	12752
UNII	P2EX7Q1UYS
CompTox Dashboard (EPA)	DTXSID70870757
- InChI: InChI=1S/C6H8Si/c7-6-4-2-1-3-5-6/h1-5H,7H3 Key: PARWUHTVGZSQPD-UHFFFAOYSA-N; InChI=1/C6H8Si/c7-6-4-2-1-3-5-6/h1-5H,7H3 Key: PARWUHTVGZSQPD-UHFFFAOYAT
- SMILES: c1ccccc1[SiH3]

Properties
Chemical formula	C_{6}H_{8}Si
Molar mass	108.215 g·mol^{−1}
Appearance	Colorless liquid
Density	0.878 g/cm^{3}
Boiling point	119 to 121 °C (246 to 250 °F; 392 to 394 K)
Solubility in water	Hydrolyzes

Hazards
- GHS labelling
Pictograms	(GHS02: Flammable) (GHS07: Exclamation mark)
Signal word	Danger
Hazard statements	H225, H302+H332, H315, H319, H335
Precautionary statements	P210, P233, P301+P312, P303+P361+P353, P304+P340+P312, P305+P351+P338
Safety data sheet (SDS)	MSDS
- Except where otherwise noted, data are given for materials in their standard state (at 25 °C [77 °F], 100 kPa). verify (what is ?) Infobox references

Phenylsilane, also known as silylbenzene, a colorless liquid, is one of the simplest organosilanes with the formula C_{6}H_{5}SiH_{3}. It is structurally related to toluene, with a silyl group replacing the methyl group. Both of these compounds have similar densities and boiling points due to these similarities. Phenylsilane is soluble in organic solvents.

== Synthesis and reactions ==
Phenylsilane is produced in two steps from Si(OEt)_{4}. In the first step, phenylmagnesium bromide is added to form Ph−Si(OEt)_{3} via a Grignard reaction. Reduction of the resulting Ph−Si(OEt)_{3} product with LiAlH_{4} affords phenylsilane.

Ph−MgBr + Si(OEt)_{4} → Ph−Si(OEt)_{3} + MgBr(OEt)

4 Ph−Si(OEt)_{3} + 3 LiAlH_{4} → 4 Ph−SiH_{3} + 3 LiAl(OEt)_{4}

== Uses ==
Phenylsilane can be used to reduce tertiary phosphine oxides to the corresponding tertiary phosphine.

P(CH_{3})_{3}O + PhSiH_{3} → P(CH_{3})_{3} + PhSiH_{2}OH

The use of phenylsilane proceeds with retention of configuration at the phosphine. For example, cyclic chiral tertiary phosphine oxides can be reduced to cyclic tertiary phosphines.

Phenylsilane combines with caesium fluoride to give the ate complex [PhSiFH_{3}]^{−}. This species functions as a hydride donor, reducing 4-oxazolium salts to 4-oxazolines.

Phenylsilane has been used as a hydride donor in synthetic enzymes.
