= Magnesocene =

Organometallic compound

Names
- IUPAC name bis(η^{5}-cyclopentadienyl)magnesium

Identifiers
CAS Number	1284-72-6
3D model (JSmol)	Interactive image
ChemSpider	10628001 wrong structure
ECHA InfoCard	100.110.799
EC Number	603-275-0
PubChem CID	24942211
CompTox Dashboard (EPA)	DTXSID50926125
- InChI: InChI=1S/2C5H5.Mg/c2*1-2-4-5-3-1;/h2*1-5H;/q2*-1;+2
- SMILES: [cH-]1cccc1.[cH-]1cccc1.[Mg+2]

Properties
Chemical formula	C_{10}H_{10}Mg
Molar mass	154.495 g·mol^{−1}
Appearance	white powder or crystals
Density	1.1 g/cm^{3}
Melting point	176 °C (349 °F; 449 K)
Boiling point	290.0 °C (554.0 °F; 563.1 K) (decomposes)
Solubility in water	Reacts violently, may ignite upon contact
Vapor pressure	0.043 mmHg @ 25 °C

Hazards
- Occupational safety and health (OHS/OSH)
Main hazards	May cause eye damage. May explode upon heat or contact with oxidizers. Flammable. May self ignite in air.
- GHS labelling
Pictograms	(GHS01: Explosive) (GHS02: Flammable) (GHS05: Corrosive)
Signal word	Danger
Hazard statements	H228, H250, H261, H314
Precautionary statements	P210, P231+P232, P280, P303+P361+P353, P304+P340+P310, P305+P351+P338+P310, P335+P334, P422
NFPA 704 (fire diamond)	3 3 3 W
Flash point	13.9±13.0 °C
Safety data sheet (SDS)	External SDS
- Except where otherwise noted, data are given for materials in their standard state (at 25 °C [77 °F], 100 kPa). Infobox references

Magnesocene, also known as bis(cyclopentadienyl)magnesium(II) and sometimes abbreviated as MgCp_{2}, is an organometallic compound with the formula Mg(η^{5}-C_{5}H_{5})_{2}. It is white powder or crystals. It is an example of an s-block main group sandwich compound, structurally related to the d-block element metallocenes, and consists of a central magnesium atom sandwiched between two cyclopentadienyl rings.

== Properties ==
Magnesocene is a white solid at room temperature. It has a melting point of 176 °C, though at atmospheric pressures it sublimes at 100 °C. Unlike ferrocene, magnesocene displays slight dissociation and subsequent ion association in polar, electron-donating solvents (such as ether and THF).

MgCp_{2} ⇌ MgCp^{+} + Cp^{−}

MgCp_{2} + MgCp^{+} ⇌ Mg_{2}Cp^{+}_{3}

MgCp_{2} + Cp^{−} ⇌ MgCp^{−}_{3}

While ferrocene is stable at ambient conditions, magnesocene decomposes rapidly on exposure to oxygen or moisture, and as such must be synthesized and stored under inert conditions.

== Structure and bonding ==
As revealed by X-ray crystallographic refinement, solid-phase magnesocene exhibits an average Mg-C and C-C bond distance of 2.30 Å and 1.39 Å, respectively, and the Cp rings adopt a staggered conformation (point group D_{5d}). Gas-phase electron diffraction has shown similar bond lengths, albeit with the Cp rings in an eclipsed conformation (point group D_{5h}).

The nature of Mg-Cp bonding has been hotly contested as to whether the interaction is primarily ionic or covalent in character. Gas-phase electron diffraction measurements have been invoked to argue for a covalent model, while vibrational spectroscopy measurements have offered evidence for both.

Hartree-Fock calculations have shown that, in contrast to transition metal metallocenes, the Mg 3d orbitals play no role in metal-ring bonding; instead, favorable bonding interactions with the Cp π system are accomplished by promotion of the two 3s electrons to the 3p_{x,y} orbitals. Further stabilization is afforded by back-donation from the Cp rings to the Mg 3s orbital. Such interactions afford a lesser degree of orbital overlap as compared to ferrocene, resulting in a comparatively weak metal-ring bond and a fairly high effective local charge on Mg. Experimental evidence in favor of an ionic bonding model can thus be explained by the very weak, highly polar Mg-Cp interactions. The weak nature of this bonding mode is responsible for magnesocene's relative instability and vigorous reactivity when compared to ferrocene.

== Synthesis ==
=== High-temperature synthesis ===
The first synthesis of magnesocene, as reported by F. A. Cotton and Geoffrey Wilkinson in 1954, involved the thermal decomposition of the cyclopentadienyl Grignard reagent. A similar procedure was offered by W. A. Barber in which cyclopentadiene is directly reacted with solid magnesium at 500-600 °C. Under water- and oxygen-free conditions, freshly distilled monomeric cyclopentadiene is directed through a tube furnace by an inert carrier gas (such as helium, argon, or nitrogen) and passed over magnesium turnings or powder. Magnesocene deposits on cooler surfaces past the exit end of the furnace. The product of this process is typically a white, fluffy mass of fine microcrystals, but large, colorless single crystals can be obtained by adjusting temperature and flow rate. If solid magnesocene is not needed, the receiving flask can instead be filled with solvent and the product collected in solution, which Barber noted as much safer to handle than the pure solid.

Mg + 2 C_{5}H_{6} → Mg(C_{5}H_{5})_{2} + H_{2} (500-600 °C)

This procedure is capable of producing a gram of product every two minutes under ideal conditions, and that with a vertical setup (in which cyclopentadiene is directed downwards and the product collected below) nearly pure product can be obtained at >80% yield (by cyclopentadiene). A horizontal setup was shown to be possible but at the expense of product purity, due to gas flow restriction by product accumulation.

=== Liquid-phase methods ===
Magnesocene can be produced from magnesium turnings in THF at mild conditions with cyclopentadienyltitanium trichloride (CpTiCl_{3}) acting as a catalyst. Maslennikov et al. later showed similar catalytic activity with Cp_{2}TiCl_{2}, TiCl_{3}, TiCl_{4}, and VCl_{3}. The mechanism, as shown by electron spin resonance, proceeds through a Cp_{2}TiH_{2}MgCl intermediate. Magnesocene formation from elemental magnesium has not been observed in THF without a catalyst present. Attempts to substitute THF with diethyl ether, diglyme, or benzene resulted only in polymerization of cyclopentadiene.

The syntheses of magnesocene and its derivatives have also been carried out in hydrocarbon solvents, such as heptane, from Cp and (^{n}Bu)(^{s}Bu)Mg.

Metallation of cyclopentadiene can also be accomplished by Mg-Al alkyl complexes with a final magnesocene yield of 85%.

== Reactivity and potential applications ==
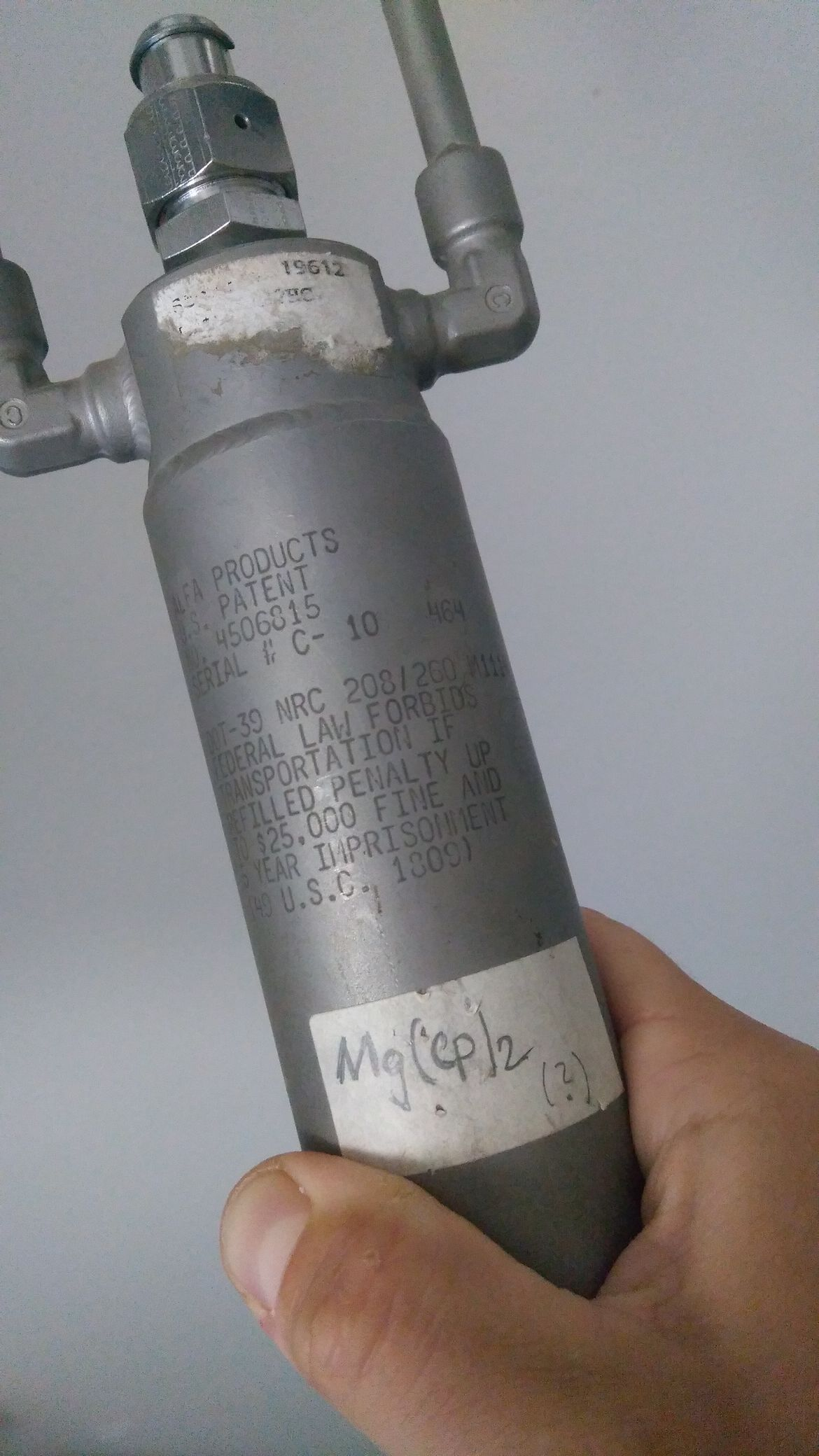
A stainless bottle containing MgCp_{2}

Magnesocene serves as an intermediate in the preparation of transition metal metallocenes:

MgCp_{2} + MCl_{2} → MCp_{2} + MgCl_{2}

Magnesocene also undergoes ligand exchange reactions with MgX_{2} (X = halide) to form CpMgX half-sandwich compounds in THF:

MgCp_{2} + MgX_{2} ⇌ 2 CpMgX

The resulting half-sandwich halides can serve as starting materials for synthesizing substituted cyclopentadienes from organic halides.

Because of its high reactivity, magnesocene is an attractive target for semiconductor research as a starting material for chemical vapor deposition and doping applications.

Magnesocene has also been investigated for its potential use as an electrolyte in next-generation magnesium ion batteries.
