= Direct process =

The direct process, also called the direct synthesis, Rochow process, and Müller-Rochow process is the most common technology for preparing organosilicon compounds on an industrial scale. It was first reported independently by Eugene G. Rochow and Richard Müller in the 1940s.

The process involves copper-catalyzed reactions of alkyl halides with elemental silicon, which take place in a fluidized bed reactor. Although theoretically possible with any alkyl halide, the best results in terms of selectivity and yield occur with chloromethane (CH_{3}Cl). Typical conditions are 300 °C and 2–5 bar. These conditions allow for 90–98% conversion for silicon and 30–90% for chloromethane. Approximately 1.4 Mton of dimethyldichlorosilane (Me_{2}SiCl_{2}) is produced annually using this process.

Few companies actually carry out the Rochow process, because of the complex technology and high capital requirements. Since the silicon is crushed prior to reaction in a fluidized bed, the companies practicing this technology are referred to as silicon crushers.

== Reaction and mechanism ==
The relevant reactions are (Me = CH_{3}):

x MeCl + Si → Me_{3}SiCl, Me_{2}SiCl_{2}, MeSiCl_{3}, Me_{4}Si_{2}Cl_{2}, …

Dimethyldichlorosilane (Me_{2}SiCl_{2}) is of particular value (precursor to silicones), but trimethylsilyl chloride (Me_{3}SiCl) and methyltrichlorosilane (MeSiCl_{3}) are also valuable.

The mechanism of the direct process is still not well understood, despite much research. Copper plays an important role, and almost certainly forms an intermetallic with the approximate composition Cu_{3}Si. This intermediate facilitates the formation of the Si-Cl and Si-Me bonds. It is proposed that close proximity of the Si-Cl to a copper-chloromethane "adduct" allows for formation of the Me-SiCl units. Transfer of a second chloromethane allows for the release of the Me_{2}SiCl_{2}. Thus, copper is oxidized from the zero oxidation state and then reduced to regenerate the catalyst.

The chain reaction can be terminated in many ways. These termination processes give rise to the other products that are seen in the reaction. For example, combining two Si-Cl groups gives the SiCl_{2} group, which undergoes Cu-catalyzed reaction with MeCl to give MeSiCl_{3}.

In addition to copper, the catalyst optimally contains promoter metals that facilitate the reaction. Tin is necessary, and synergistic with zinc; but extremely minute quantities of many other promoter metals appear to influence the reaction. Among the many promoter metals, iron, aluminum, titanium, manganese, nickel, lead, phosphorus, antimony, magnesium, calcium, bismuth, arsenic, and cadmium have been mentioned.

== Product distribution and isolation ==
The major product for the direct process should be dichlorodimethylsilane, Me_{2}SiCl_{2}. However, many other products are formed. Unlike most reactions, this distribution is actually desirable because the product isolation is very efficient. Each methylchlorosilane has specific and often substantial applications. Me_{2}SiCl_{2} is the most useful. It is the precursor for the majority of silicon products produced on an industrial scale. The other products are used in the preparation of siloxane polymers as well as specialized applications.

Dichlorodimethylsilane is the major product of the reaction, as is expected, being obtained in about 70–90% yield. The next most abundant product is methyltrichlorosilane (MeSiCl_{3}), at 5–15% of the total. Other products include Me_{3}SiCl (2–4%), MeHSiCl_{2} (1–4%), and Me_{2}HSiCl (0.1–0.5%).

The Me_{2}SiCl_{2} is purified by fractional distillation. Although the boiling points of the various chloromethylsilanes are similar (Me_{2}SiCl_{2}: 70 °C, MeSiCl_{3}: 66 °C, Me_{3}SiCl: 57 °C, MeHSiCl_{2}: 41 °C, Me_{2}HSiCl: 35 °C), the distillation utilizes columns with high separating capacities, connected in series. The purity of the products crucially affects the production of siloxane polymers, otherwise chain branching arises.
