= Organoyttrium chemistry =

Study of chemical compounds containing yttrium-carbon bonds

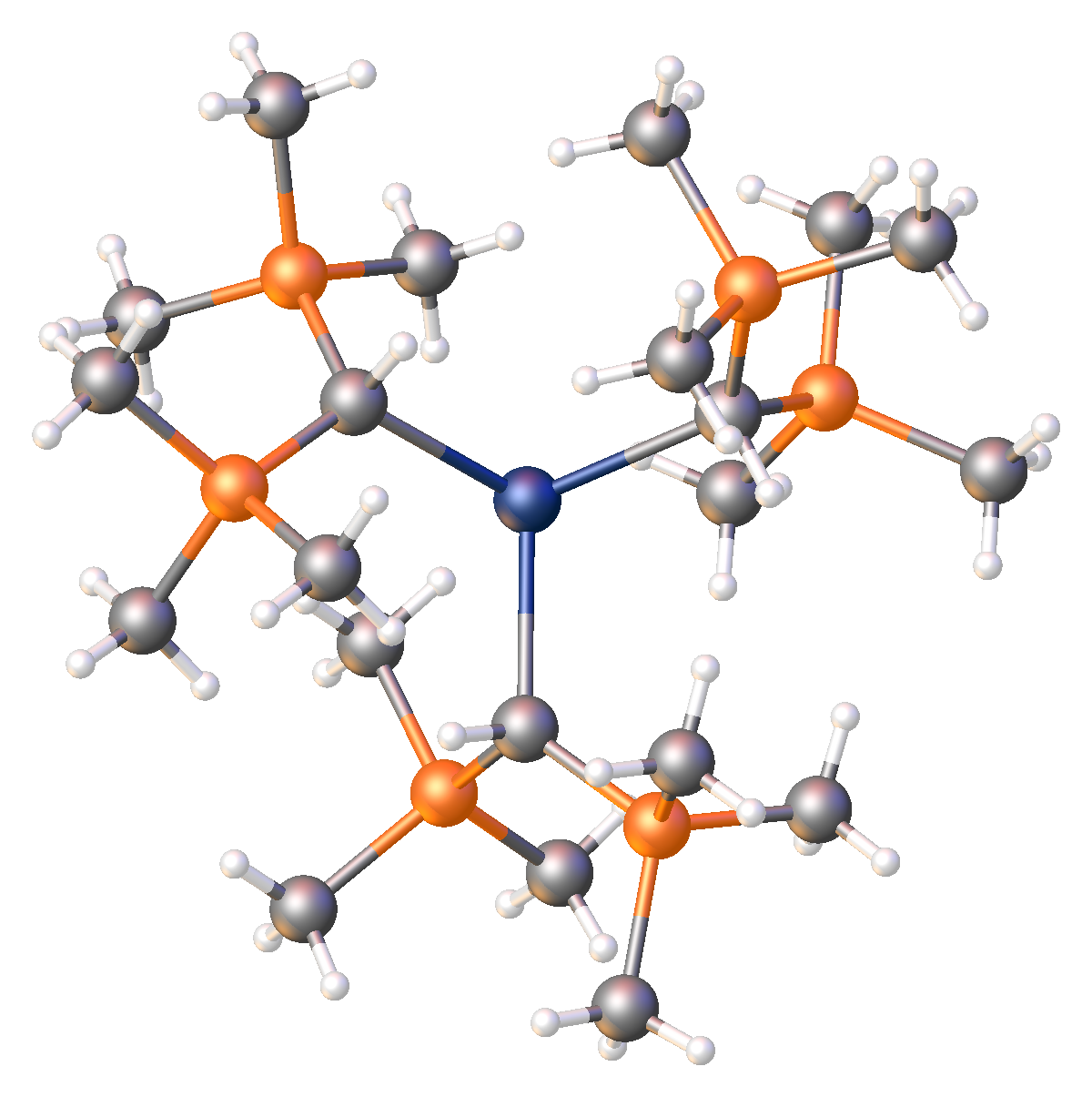
Structure of Y(CH(tms)_{2})_{3} (tms = SiMe_{3}).

Organoyttrium chemistry is the study of compounds containing carbon-yttrium bonds. These compounds are almost invariably formal Y^{3+} derivatives, are generally diamagnetic and colorless, a consequence of the closed-shell configuration of the trication. Organoyttrium compounds are mainly of academic interest.

Organoyttrium compounds are often prepared by alkylation of YCl_{3}.
