= Knölker complex =

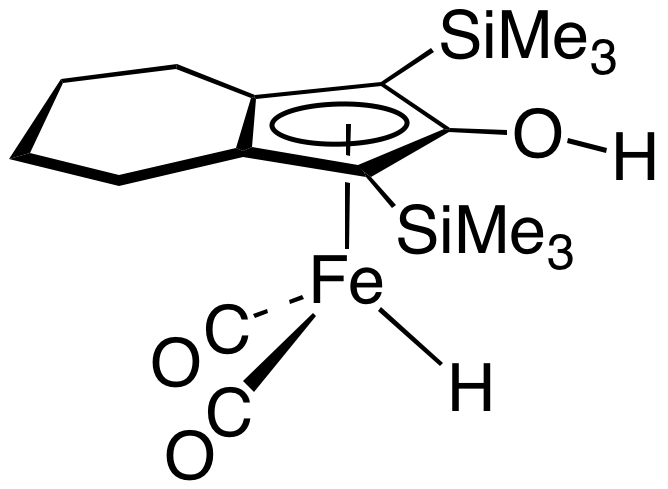

Names
- IUPAC name Dicarbonylhydro[(1,2,3,3a,7a-η)-4,5,6,7-tetrahydro-2-hydroxy-1,3-bis(trimethylsilyl)-1H-inden-1-yl]iron

Identifiers
| CAS Number | 243866-64-0 |
| 3D model (JSmol) | Interactive image |
- InChI: InChI=1S/C15H27OSi2.2CO.Fe.H/c1-17(2,3)14-11-9-7-8-10-12(11)15(13(14)16)18(4,5)6;2*1-2;;/h16H,7-10H2,1-6H3;;;;/q-1;;;+1; Key: SOJBHSHALNCIOI-UHFFFAOYSA-N
- SMILES: [H-][Fe+2]1234(C#O)(C#O)C5(O)=C4(C=63CCCCC62[C-]51[Si](C)(C)C)[Si](C)(C)C

Properties
| Chemical formula | C_{17}H_{28}FeO_{3}Si_{2} |
| Molar mass | 392.423 g·mol^{−1} |
| Solubility in water | polar organic solvents |
- Except where otherwise noted, data are given for materials in their standard state (at 25 °C [77 °F], 100 kPa). Infobox references

The Knölker complex is an organoiron compound, which is a catalyst for transfer hydrogenation. The complex features an hydroxycyclopentadienyl ligand bound to an Fe(CO)_{2}H centre. It is generated by the corresponding cyclopentadienone tricarbonyl by treatment with base followed by acidification. It is named for Hans-Joachim Knölker The compound is related to the organoruthenium compound called Shvo's complex, a hydroxycyclopentadienyl derivative that also functions as a catalyst for hydrogenation.
