= Shvo catalyst =

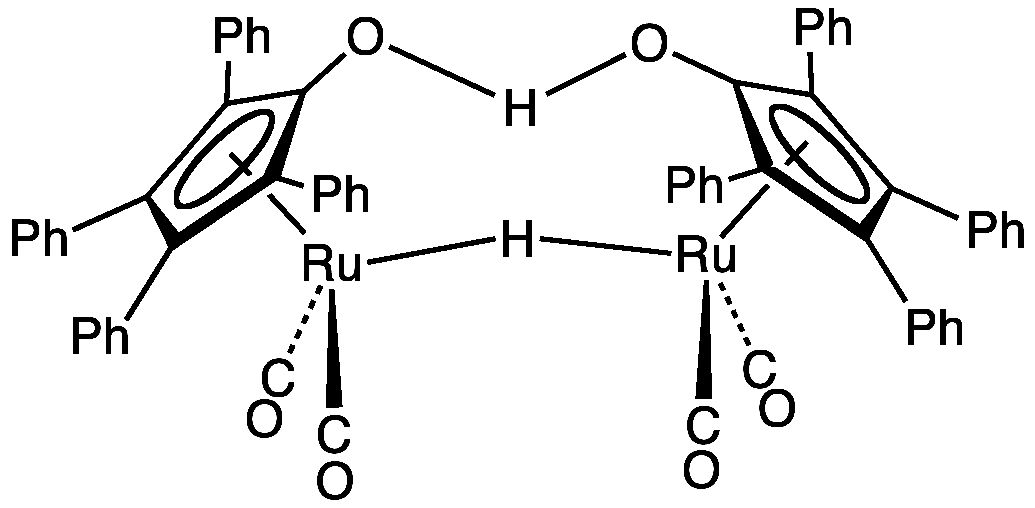

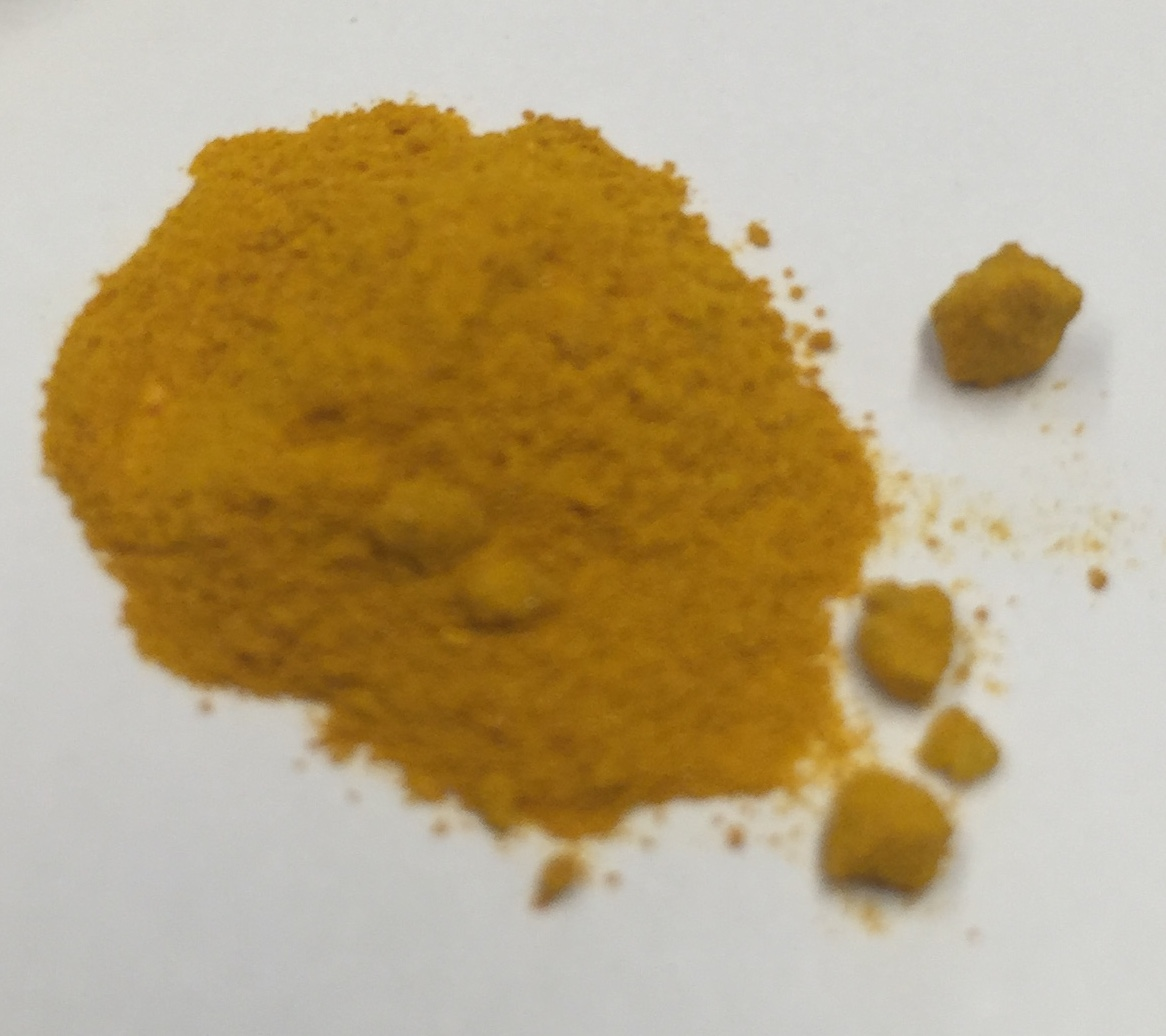

Names
- IUPAC name 1-Hydroxytetraphenylcyclopentadienyl-(tetraphenyl-2,4-cyclopentadien-1-one)-μ-hydrotetracarbonyldiruthenium(II)

Identifiers
CAS Number	104439-77-2
3D model (JSmol)	Interactive image
ChemSpider	26606435
PubChem CID	56845452
- InChI: InChI=1S/C29H21O.C29H20O.4CO.2Ru/c2*30-29-27(23-17-9-3-10-18-23)25(21-13-5-1-6-14-21)26(22-15-7-2-8-16-22)28(29)24-19-11-4-12-20-24;4*1-2;;/h1-20,30H;1-20H;;;;;; Key: LYADOKFHMFDLJK-UHFFFAOYSA-N
- SMILES: [C-]#[O+].[C-]#[O+].[C-]#[O+].[C-]#[O+].C1=CC=C(C=C1)C2=C(C(=O)C(=C2C3=CC=CC=C3)C4=CC=CC=C4)C5=CC=CC=C5.C1=CC=C(C=C1)[C]2[C]([C]([C]([C]2C3=CC=CC=C3)O)C4=CC=CC=C4)C5=CC=CC=C5.[Ru].[Ru]

Properties
Chemical formula	C_{62}H_{42}O_{6}Ru_{2}
Molar mass	1085.13
Appearance	orange solid
Melting point	223 to 227 °C (433 to 441 °F; 496 to 500 K)
Solubility in water	polar organic solvents
- Except where otherwise noted, data are given for materials in their standard state (at 25 °C [77 °F], 100 kPa). verify (what is ?) Infobox references

The Shvo catalyst is an organoruthenium compound that catalyzes the reduction of polar functional groups including aldehydes, ketones and imines through hydrogenation and transfer hydrogenation reactions. It is also known to catalyse the reverse reactions, the dehydrogenation of alcohols and amines to the corresponding carbonyl compounds and imines. The complex is an early example of a (transfer) hydrogenation catalyst that operates via an "outer sphere mechanism" and is the namesake for the entire class of Shvo-type catalysts.

== Synthesis and structure ==
The catalyst is named after Youval Shvo, who uncovered it through studies on the effect of diphenylacetylene on the catalytic properties of triruthenium dodecacarbonyl. The reaction of diphenylacetylene and Ru_{3}(CO)_{12} gives the piano stool complex (Ph_{4}C_{4}CO)Ru(CO)_{3}) (1). Subsequent hydrogenation of this tricarbonyl affords Shvo's catalyst. The iron analogue is also known, see Knölker complex.

The compound contains a pair of equivalent Ru centres that are bridged by a strong hydrogen bond and a bridging hydride. In solution, the complex dissociates unsymmetrically:

(C_{5}Ph_{4}O)_{2}HRu_{2}H(CO)_{4} $\ce{<<=>}$ C_{5}Ph_{4}OH)RuH(CO)_{2} + (C_{5}Ph_{4}O)Ru(CO)_{2}

== (De-)Hydrogenation catalysis ==
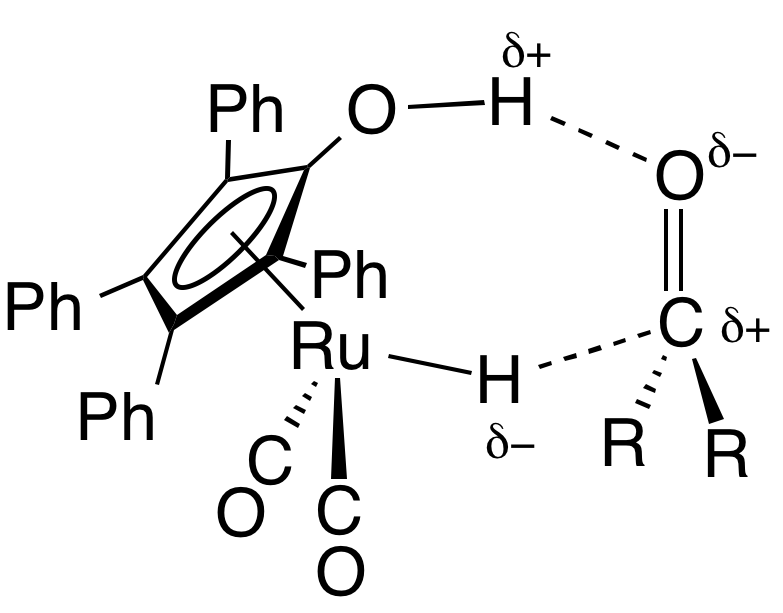
Structure of proposed intermediate in transfer hydrogenation of a ketone by Shvo's catalyst.

Example of hydrogenation of a carbonyl using Shvo's catalyst.

In the presence of a suitable hydrogen donor or hydrogen gas, Shvo's catalyst effects the hydrogenation of several polar functional groups, e.g. aldehydes, ketones, imines, and iminium ions. Many alkenes and ketones undergo hydrogenation, although conditions are forcing: 145 °C (500 psi). One obstacle to the use of Shvo's catalyst in the hydrogenation of alkynes is its propensity to bind the alkyne quite tightly, forming a stable vinyl ethercomplex that gradually poisons the catalyst. Intramolecular reactions proceed as well, illustrated by the conversion of allylic alcohols to ketones. Shvo's catalyst also catalyzes dehydrogenations.

Example of an imine hydrogenation using Shvo's catalyst.

=== Mechanism ===
The mechanism of hydrogenation catalyzed by Shvo's catalyst has been a matter of debate, broadly between two alternative descriptions of the double bond's interaction with the complex at the rate-determining step. The proposed alternatives are an inner-sphere mechanism, where the transition state involves interaction with the metal only, and an outer-sphere mechanism, in which the cyclopentadienol proton also interacts with the substrate. Kinetic isotope studies provide evidence of a concerted transfer due to strong rate influence from both the ligand -OH and the metal hydride.

== Other reactions ==
Shvo's catalyst facilitates the Tishchenko reaction, i.e., the formation of esters from alcohols. The early step in this reaction is the conversion of the primary alcohol to the aldehyde.

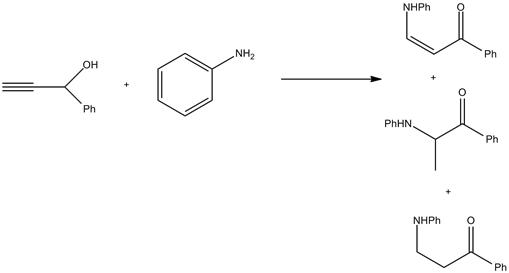
Products obtained from amination of a propargylic alcohol using Shvo's catalyst.

Addition of the amine is facilitated through oxidation to the ynone, followed by reduction of the product.

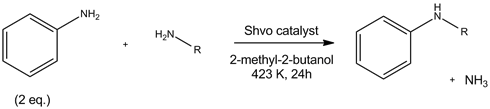
Example of alkylation of an amine using Shvo's catalyst.

Another case of "hydrogen borrowing", the alkylation of amines using other amines is also promoted by Shvo's catalyst. The reaction proceeds through oxidation to an imine, which allows nucleophilic attack, followed by an elimination step and reduction of the double bond.
