= Chloro(cyclopentadienyl)bis(triphenylphosphine)ruthenium =

CpRuCl(PPh_{3})_{2}
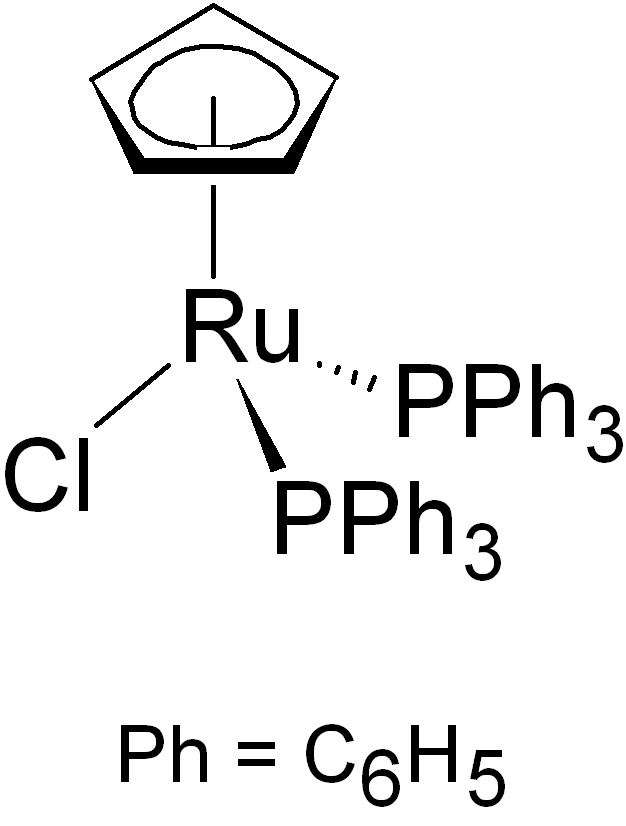

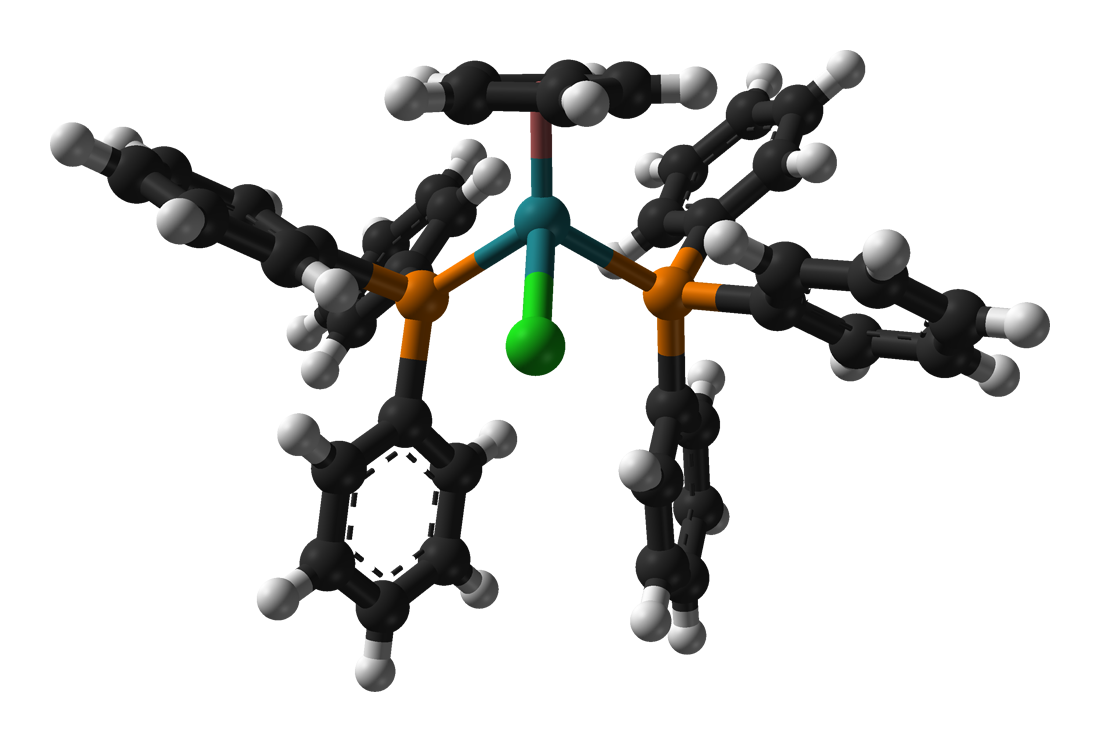

Identifiers
CAS Number	32993-05-8
3D model (JSmol)	Interactive image
ChemSpider	34560989
ECHA InfoCard	100.154.457
PubChem CID	78076231
- InChI: InChI=1S/2C18H15P.C5H5.ClH.Ru/c2*1-4-10-16(11-5-1)19(17-12-6-2-7-13-17)18-14-8-3-9-15-18;1-2-4-5-3-1;;/h2*1-15H;1-3H,4H2;1H;/q;;-1;;+2/p-1 Key: WGQMSPWAXIDKEY-UHFFFAOYSA-M; InChI=1/2C18H15P.C5H5.ClH.Ru/c2*1-4-10-16(11-5-1)19(17-12-6-2-7-13-17)18-14-8-3-9-15-18;1-2-4-5-3-1;;/h2*1-15H;1-3H,4H2;1H;/q;;-1;;+2/p-1 Key: WGQMSPWAXIDKEY-REWHXWOFAY
- SMILES: c1ccc(cc1)P(c2ccccc2)c3ccccc3.c1ccc(cc1)P(c2ccccc2)c3ccccc3.c1ccc[cH-1]1.[Cl-].[Ru+2]

Properties
Chemical formula	C_{41}H_{35}ClP_{2}Ru
Molar mass	726.19 g/mol
Appearance	Orange solid
Melting point	135 °C (275 °F; 408 K)
Solubility in water	Insoluble

Hazards
- GHS labelling
Pictograms	(GHS07: Exclamation mark)
Signal word	Warning
Hazard statements	H302, H312, H315, H319, H332, H335
Precautionary statements	P261, P264, P270, P271, P280, P301+P312, P302+P352, P304+P312, P304+P340, P305+P351+P338, P312, P321, P322, P330, P332+P313, P337+P313, P362, P363, P403+P233, P405, P501
- Except where otherwise noted, data are given for materials in their standard state (at 25 °C [77 °F], 100 kPa). verify (what is ?) Infobox references

Chloro(cyclopentadienyl)bis(triphenylphosphine)ruthenium is the organoruthenium half-sandwich compound with formula RuCl(PPh_{3})_{2}(C_{5}H_{5}). It as an air-stable orange crystalline solid that is used in a variety of organometallic synthetic and catalytic transformations. The compound has idealized C_{s} symmetry. It is soluble in chloroform, dichloromethane, and acetone.

== Preparation ==
Chloro(cyclopentadienyl)bis(triphenylphosphine)ruthenium was first reported in 1969 when it was prepared by reacting dichlorotris(triphenylphosphine)ruthenium(II) with cyclopentadiene.

RuCl_{2}(PPh_{3})_{3} + C_{5}H_{6} → RuCl(PPh_{3})_{3}(C_{5}H_{5}) + HCl

It is prepared by heating a mixture of ruthenium(III) chloride, triphenylphosphine, and cyclopentadiene in ethanol.

== Reactions ==
Chloro(cyclopentadienyl)bis(triphenylphosphine)ruthenium(II) undergoes a variety of reactions often by involving substitution of the chloride. With phenylacetylene it gives the phenyl vinylidene complex:

(C_{5}H_{5})(PPh_{3})_{2}RuCl + HC_{2}Ph + NH_{4}[PF_{6}] → [Ru(C:CHPh)(PPh_{3})_{2}(C_{5}H_{5})][PF_{6}] + NH_{4}Cl

Displacement of one PPh_{3} by carbon monoxide affords a chiral compound.

(C_{5}H_{5})(PPh_{3})_{2}RuCl + CO → (C_{5}H_{5})(PPh_{3})(CO)RuCl + PPh_{3}

The compound can also be converted into the hydride:

(C_{5}H_{5})(PPh_{3})_{2}RuCl + NaOMe → (C_{5}H_{5})(PPh_{3})_{2}RuH + NaCl + CH_{2}O

A related complex is tris(acetonitrile)cyclopentadienylruthenium hexafluorophosphate, which has three labile MeCN ligands.

== Applications ==
Chloro(cyclopentadienyl)bis(triphenylphosphine)ruthenium(II) serves as a catalyst for a variety of specialized reactions. For example, in the presence of NH_{4}PF_{6} it catalyzes the isomerisation of allylic alcohols to the corresponding saturated carbonyls.
