= Pentamethylcyclopentadienyl ruthenium dichloride dimer =

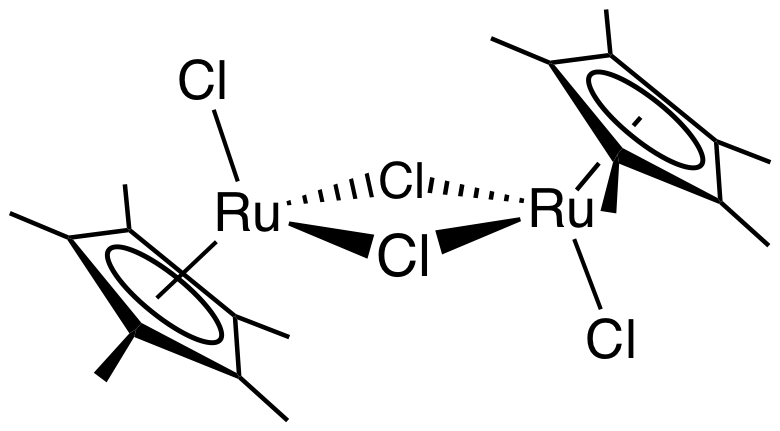

Names
- IUPAC name Di-μ-chlorido-bis[chlorido(pentamethyl-η^{5}-cyclopentadienyl)ruthenium(III)]
- Other names Di-μ-chloro-bis[chloro(pentamethylcyclopentadienyl)ruthenium(III)] Dichloro(pentamethylcyclopentadienyl)ruthenium(III)

Identifiers
CAS Number	82091-73-4
3D model (JSmol)	Interactive image; monomer: Interactive image
ChemSpider	57426912
PubChem CID	170852889; monomer: 23290171
- InChI: InChI=1S/2C10H15.4ClH.2Ru/c2*1-6-7(2)9(4)10(5)8(6)3;;;;;;/h2*1-5H3;4*1H;;/q;;;;;;2*+2/p-4 Key: VDXZXHGAMPUNED-UHFFFAOYSA-J; monomer: InChI=1S/C10H15.2ClH.Ru/c1-7-6-10(4,5)9(3)8(7)2;;;/h1-5H3;2*1H;/q-1;;;+2/p-2 Key: CHSNJSBMXZWKQT-UHFFFAOYSA-L
- SMILES: CC1=C([C](C(=C1C)C)C)C.CC1=C([C](C(=C1C)C)C)C.[Cl-].[Cl-].[Cl-].[Cl-].[Ru+2].[Ru+2]; monomer: CC1=[C-]C(C(=C1C)C)(C)C.Cl[Ru]Cl

Properties
Chemical formula	C_{20}H_{30}Cl_{4}Ru_{2}
Appearance	brown solid
- Except where otherwise noted, data are given for materials in their standard state (at 25 °C [77 °F], 100 kPa). Infobox references

Pentamethylcyclopentadienyl ruthenium dichloride is an organoruthenium chemistry with the formula [(C_{5}(CH_{3})_{5})RuCl_{2}]_{2}, commonly abbreviated [Cp*RuCl_{2}]_{2}. This brown paramagnetic solid is a reagent in organometallic chemistry. It is an unusual example of a compound that exists as isomers that differ in the intermetallic separation, a difference that is manifested in a number of physical properties.

== Preparation, structure, reactions ==
The compound has C_{2h} symmetry, with each metal atom having pseudo-octahedral geometry. In the crystal structure, two isomers are observed in the unit cell, one with a 2.93 Å ruthenium–ruthenium bond and the other with a long internuclear distance of 3.75 Å. The former isomer is diamagnetic, and the latter is magnetic.

It is prepared by the reaction of hydrated ruthenium trichloride with pentamethylcyclopentadiene.

2 Cp*H + 2 RuCl_{3}·3H_{2}O → [Cp*RuCl_{2}]_{2} + 2 HCl + 6 H_{2}O

The reaction is accompanied by formation of decamethylruthenocene.

Pentamethylcyclopentadienyl ruthenium dichloride can reduced to the diamagnetic tetramer of Ru(II):

2 [Cp*RuCl_{2}]_{2} + 2 Zn → [Cp*RuCl]_{4} + 2 ZnCl_{2}

Methoxide also can be used to produce a related diruthenium(II) derivative, which is also diamagnetic:

[Cp*RuCl_{2}]_{2} + 3 NaOCH_{3} + HOCH_{3} → [Cp*RuOCH_{3}]_{2}] + 3 NaCl + CH_{2}O + HCl

Treating the tetramer with 1,5-cyclooctadiene in etheral solvent gives the mononuclear complex chloro(1,5-cyclooctadiene)(pentamethylcyclopentadienyl)ruthenium(II).

0.25 [Cp*RuCl]_{4} + 1,5-cyclooctadiene → Cp*RuCl(1,5-cyclooctadiene)

Compounds like Cp*RuCl(1,5-cyclooctadiene), the tetramer [Cp*RuCl]_{4}, and related diamagnetic Cp*Ru(III) complexes have been investigated as hydrogenation catalysts.

== See also ==
- (Cymene)ruthenium dichloride dimer - [(cymene)RuCl_{2}]_{2}
- Pentamethylcyclopentadienyl iridium dichloride dimer - [Cp*IrCl_{2}]_{2}
