= Martin A. Bennett =

Australian inorganic chemist

Martin A. Bennett FRS FAA
- Born: 11 August 1935 (age 90); Harrow, England
- Education: Imperial College
- Employer: Australian National University

Martin Arthur Bennett FRS FAA (born 11 August 1935) is an Australian inorganic chemist. He gained recognition for studies on the co-ordination chemistry of tertiary phosphines, olefins, and acetylenes, and the relationship of their behaviour to homogeneous catalysis.

== Professional career ==
Born in Harrow, London on 11 August 1935, Bennett studied at The Haberdashers' Aske's Boys' School and received his PhD under the supervision of Geoffrey Wilkinson at Imperial College. He was subsequently a researcher at University College, London with Ronald Nyholm and then with Arthur Adamson. While in London, he prepared the rhodium complex [RhCl(PPh_{3})_{3}], now known as Wilkinson's catalyst. In the 1960s he took a position in the Research School of Chemistry at the Australian National University in Canberra.

Bennett was elected a Fellow of the Australian Academy of Science in 1980 and of the Royal Society in 1995.

== Contributions ==
At ANU, Bennett developed several lines of research broadly on themes in organometallic chemistry. This included extending work on the iridium analogue of Wilkinson's catalyst which he began at University College with Milner. Wilkinson's catalyst can be prepared by reducing rhodium(III) chloride in boiling ethanol in the presence of an excess of triphenylphosphine, but the equivalent preparative conditions lead not to [IrCl(PPh_{3})_{3}] but instead to a mixture of iridium(III) products, primarily the hydrogen chloride adduct of the analogue:

IrCl_{3}(H_{2}O)_{3} + 4 PPh_{3} → [HIrCl_{2}(PPh_{3})_{3}] + OPPh_{3} + HCl + 2 H_{2}O

Bennett prepared the analogue from the 1,5-cyclooctadiene (1,5-cod) iridium(I) dimer, [(η^{4}-1,5-cod)Ir(μ-Cl)]_{2}, using an excess of triphenylphosphine in ligroin under reflux. The product is isomorphous with Wilkinson's catalyst but does not lose a triphenylphosphine ligand through dissociation in organic solvents anywhere near as readily. A phosphine is lost under oxidative conditions with chlorine, affording initially [IrCl_{3}(PPh_{3})_{2}] and with excess chlorine, the iridium(IV) complex [IrCl_{4}(PPh_{3})_{2}] is obtained. [IrCl(PPh_{3})_{3}] rearranges on heating via an insertion reaction, an ortho-metalation of one of the phenyl moieties, to produce the six-co-ordinate organometallic iridium(III) hydride [HIrCl(PPh_{3})_{2}(Ph_{2}PC_{6}H_{4})] – an example of iridium(I)-iridium(III) tautomerism involving the formation of a bidentate phosphine ligand with a carbon donor atom:

[(η^{4}-1,5-cod)Ir(μ-Cl)]_{2} + 4 PPh_{3} → 2 [IrCl(PPh_{3})_{3}] + 2 1,5-cod

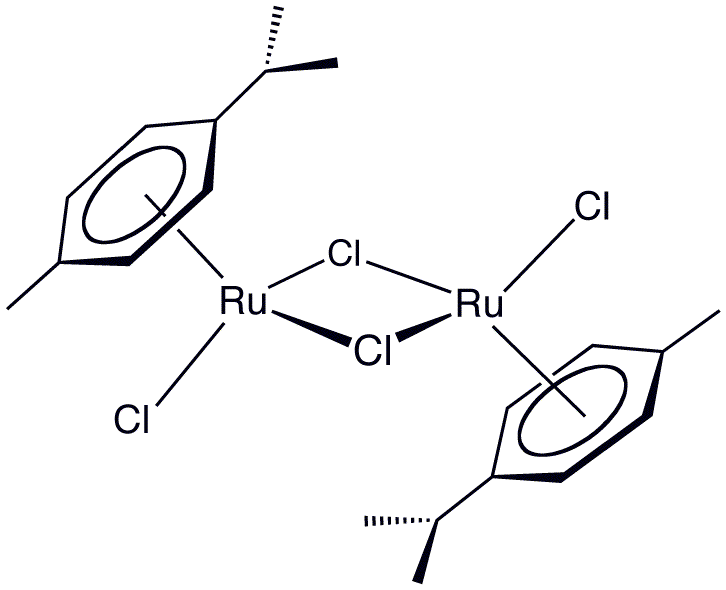
The (cymene)ruthenium dichloride dimer

Bennett was the first to prepare complexes of cyclooctyne, cycloheptyne, and cyclohexyne. He developed rare examples of metal-alkene complexes that exist in two oxidation states. His group first prepared the now-popular reagent (cymene)ruthenium dichloride dimer, which is converted into a monomer by reaction with 1,1'-bis(diphenylphosphino)ferrocene for use in borrowing hydrogen catalysis
