= (Pentamethylcyclopentadienyl)titanium trichloride =

Names
- Other names Cp*TiCl_{3}

Identifiers
CAS Number	12129-06-5
3D model (JSmol)	Interactive image
ChemSpider	11601864
ECHA InfoCard	100.152.688
EC Number	624-062-9
PubChem CID	16212911
UNII	RM8V7EFM46
UN number	3261
- InChI: InChI=1S/C10H15.3ClH.Ti/c1-6-7(2)9(4)10(5)8(6)3;;;;/h1-5H3;3*1H;/q;;;;+3/p-3 Key: QCEOZLISXJGWSW-UHFFFAOYSA-K
- SMILES: CC1=C([C](C(=C1C)C)C)C.Cl[Ti](Cl)Cl

Properties
Chemical formula	C_{10}H_{15}Cl_{3}Ti
Molar mass	289.45 g·mol^{−1}
Appearance	Orange solid
Melting point	225 °C (437 °F; 498 K)

Hazards
- GHS labelling
Pictograms	(GHS05: Corrosive)
Signal word	Danger
Hazard statements	H314
Precautionary statements	P280, P305+P351+P338, P310
- Except where otherwise noted, data are given for materials in their standard state (at 25 °C [77 °F], 100 kPa). Infobox references

(Pentamethylcyclopentadienyl)titanium trichloride is an organotitanium compound with the formula Cp*TiCl_{3} (Cp* = C_{5}(CH_{3})_{5}). It is an orange solid. The compound adopts a piano stool geometry. An early synthesis involve the combination of lithium pentamethylcyclopentadienide and titanium tetrachloride.

The compound is an intermediate in the synthesis of decamethyltitanocene dichloride. In the presence of organoaluminium compounds and other additives, it catalyzes the polymerization of alkenes.

== See also ==
- (Cyclopentadienyl)titanium trichloride
