= (Cyclopentadienyl)titanium trichloride =

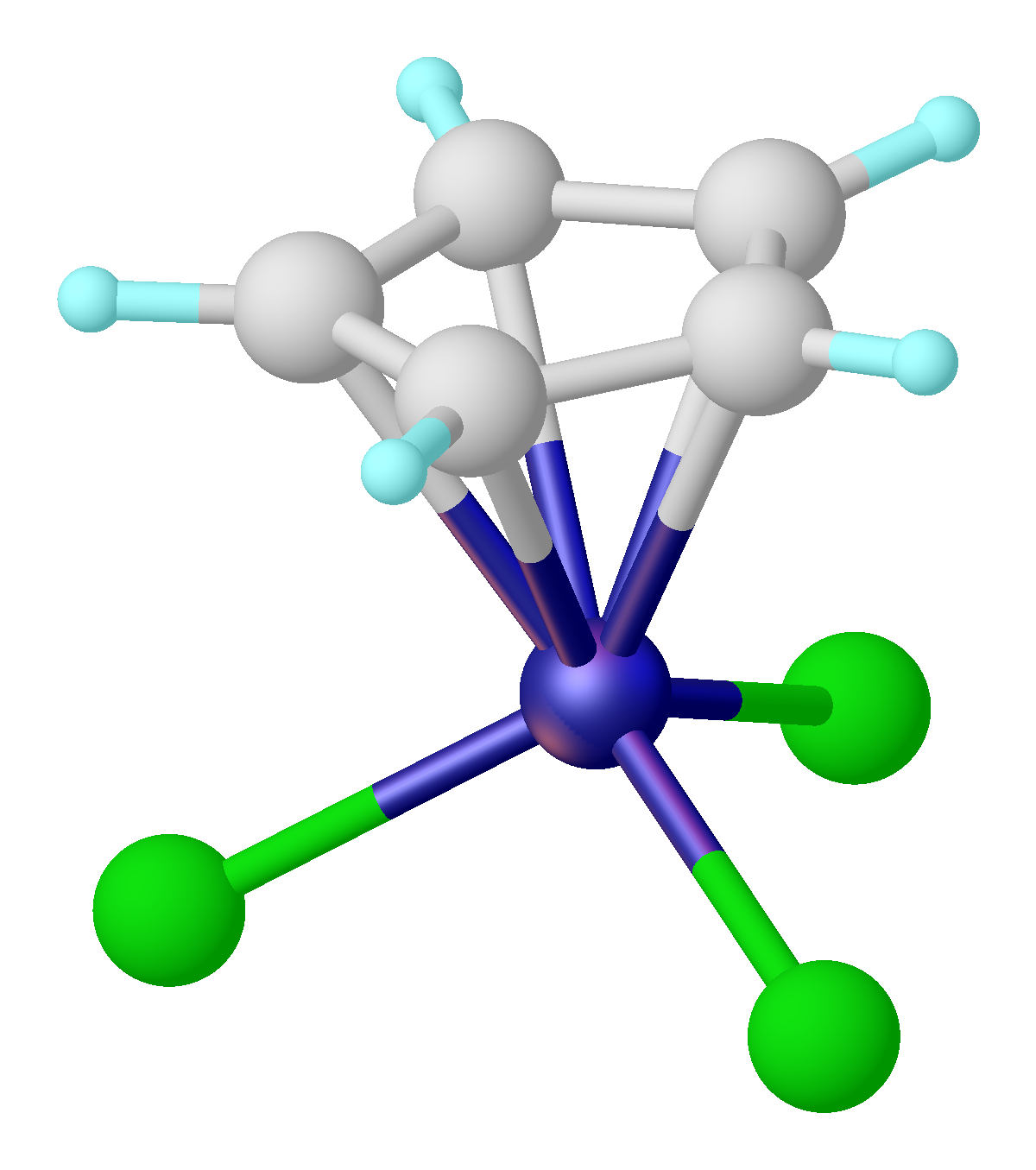

Names
- Other names Titanocene trichloride

Identifiers
CAS Number	1270-98-0
3D model (JSmol)	Interactive image
ChemSpider	11601864
ECHA InfoCard	100.156.156
PubChem CID	11127785
UNII	BPJ2QGJ6ZF
CompTox Dashboard (EPA)	DTXSID50925759
- InChI: InChI=1S/C5H5.3ClH.Ti/c1-2-4-5-3-1;;;;/h1-5H;3*1H;/q;;;;+3/p-3 Key: AENCLWKVWIIOQH-UHFFFAOYSA-K
- SMILES: c1[cH-]ccc1.Cl[Ti+](Cl)Cl

Properties
Chemical formula	C_{5}H_{5}Cl_{3}Ti
Molar mass	219.31 g·mol^{−1}
Appearance	orange solid
Density	1.768 g/cm^{3}
Melting point	210 °C (410 °F; 483 K)
- Except where otherwise noted, data are given for materials in their standard state (at 25 °C [77 °F], 100 kPa). Infobox references

(Cyclopentadienyl)titanium trichloride is an organotitanium compound with the formula (C_{5}H_{5})TiCl_{3}. It is a moisture sensitive orange solid. The compound adopts a piano stool geometry.

== Preparation and reactions ==
(C_{5}H_{5})TiCl_{3} is prepared by the reaction of titanocene dichloride and titanium tetrachloride:

(C_{5}H_{5})_{2}TiCl_{2} + TiCl_{4} → 2 (C_{5}H_{5})TiCl_{3}

The complex is electrophilic, readily forming alkoxide complexes upon treatment with alcohols.

Reduction of (cyclopentadienyl)titanium trichloride with zinc powder gives the polymeric Ti(III) derivative (cyclopentadienyl)titanium dichloride:

(C_{5}H_{5})TiCl_{3} + 0.5 Zn → 1/n [(C_{5}H_{5})TiCl_{2}]_{n} + ZnCl_{2}

A related reduction can be effected with cobaltocene:

(C_{5}H_{5})TiCl_{3} + (C_{5}H_{5})_{2}Co → [(C_{5}H_{5})_{2}Co]^{+}[(C_{5}H_{5})TiCl_{3}]^{−}

Other evidence for the Lewis acidity of the trichloride is the ready formation of adducts with phosphine ligands:

(C_{5}H_{5})TiCl_{3} + P(CH_{3})_{3} → (C_{5}H_{5})TiCl_{3}(P(CH_{3})_{3}

== See also ==
- (Cyclopentadienyl)zirconium trichloride
- (Pentamethylcyclopentadienyl)titanium trichloride
- (Indenyl)titanium trichloride
