= Senecio polyanthemoides =

Scientific classification
- Kingdom: Plantae
- Clade: Tracheophytes
- Clade: Angiosperms
- Clade: Eudicots
- Clade: Asterids
- Order: Asterales
- Family: Asteraceae
- Genus: Senecio
- Species: S. polyanthemoides

Binomial name
- Senecio polyanthemoides Sch.Bip.

Species of flowering plant

Senecio polyanthemoides is a species of flowering plant in the family Asteraceae, native to KwaZulu-Natal, South Africa.

== Description ==
A bushy annual herb that grows up to 1.8 metres tall. The stems are woody at the base and are covered with fine loose whitish hairs that resemble cobwebs, with glands on the surface. Leaves are present along the full length of the stem.

=== Leaves ===
Leaves grow up to 15 by 4 cm but are often smaller, sometimes only half that size, and tend to become smaller towards the top of the plant. They are lance-shaped, longer than wide and tapering at both ends, with a pointed tip. The base narrows into a shape that resembles a stalk and sometimes the leaf base runs down the stem. The edges are rolled towards the underside and are either smooth, sharply toothed, or divided into lobes. The upper surface is smooth or may be slightly rough and the underside has a thin white woolly covering.

=== Flower heads ===
The flower heads have ray florets, which are the petal-like outer flowers typical of this genus. The flower stalks have small bracts that resemble small leaves, arranged in a branched flat-topped cluster. The cup of bracts beneath the flower head is bell-shaped, approximately 4mm tall by 3mm wide, and is composed of 16 to 20 smooth bracts with a ridge along the back. There are around 8 ray florets and the centre of the flower is bright yellow.

=== Seeds ===
The seeds are 1.5mm long, cylindrical, ribbed and slightly angular with minute hairs.

== Distribution ==
This species occurs from Port St Johns through Natal to the mountains of the eastern Transvaal and Swaziland, as far north as the Zoutpansberg, and also in Mozambique. It is found from sea level up to 1,500m. It grows on forest margins, roadsides, old fields and felled plantations. Flowers appear mainly in September and October, though the plant may flower in any month. It has been introduced as a weed in the Cape Peninsula and in Australia.

== Chemistry ==
A study of the essential oils of Senecio polyanthemoides across three district municipalities of KwaZulu-Natal identified 63 constituents, with four distinct chemotypes found across populations. Major components include β-pinene, myrcene, α-phellandrene, α-pinene, sabinene, α-terpinene, p-cymene, β-phellandrene, limonene, cis-β-ocimene, trans-β-ocimene, γ-terpinene, β-caryophyllene, α-humulene, germacrene D, bicyclogermacrene and δ-cadinene.
