= Tris(acetonitrile)cyclopentadienylruthenium hexafluorophosphate =

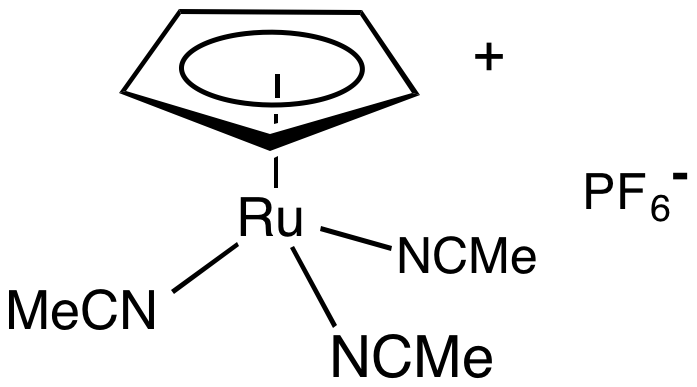

Identifiers
| CAS Number | 80049-61-2 |
| 3D model (JSmol) | Interactive image |
| ChemSpider | 9255715 |
| ECHA InfoCard | 100.152.130 |
| PubChem CID | 11080566 |
| CompTox Dashboard (EPA) | DTXSID60746270 |
- InChI: InChI=1S/C5H5.3C2H3N.F6P.Ru/c1-2-4-5-3-1;3*1-2-3;1-7(2,3,4,5)6;/h1-5H;3*1H3;;/q;;;;-1;+1 Key: HJQVFVSAQOQXRG-UHFFFAOYSA-N
- SMILES: CC#N.CC#N.CC#N.C1=C[CH]C=C1.F[P-](F)(F)(F)(F)F.[Ru+]

Properties
| Chemical formula | C_{11}H_{14}N_{3}RuPF_{6} |
| Molar mass | 434.28 |
| Appearance | yellow/brown solid |
- Except where otherwise noted, data are given for materials in their standard state (at 25 °C [77 °F], 100 kPa). Infobox references

Tris(acetonitrile)cyclopentadienylruthenium hexafluorophosphate is an organoruthenium compound with the formula [(C_{5}H_{5})Ru(NCCH_{3})_{3}]PF_{6}, abbreviated [CpRu(NCMe)_{3}]PF_{6}. It is a yellow-brown solid that is soluble in polar organic solvents. The compound is a salt consisting of the hexafluorophosphate anion and the cation [CpRu(NCMe)_{3}]^{+}. In coordination chemistry, it is used as a source of RuCp^{+} for further derivitization. In organic synthesis, it is a homogeneous catalyst. It enables C-C bond formation and promotes cycloadditions. The cyclopentadienyl ligand (Cp) is bonded in an η^{5} manner to the Ru(II) center.

== Preparation ==
The title complex is synthesized in two steps from the (benzene)ruthenium dichloride dimer. In the first step, the Cp^{−} group is installed using cyclopentadienylthallium:

[(C_{6}H_{6})RuCl_{2}]_{2} + 2 TlCp + 2 NH_{4}PF_{6} → 2 [Cp(C_{6}H_{6})Ru]PF_{6} + 2 TlCl + 2 NH_{4}Cl

The second step entails photochemical displacement of the benzene ligand, which is replaced by three equivalents of acetonitrile (MeCN):

[Cp(C_{6}H_{6})Ru]PF_{6} + 3 MeCN → [CpRu(NCMe)_{3}]PF_{6} + C_{6}H_{6}
