= Decamethyltitanocene dichloride =

Names
- Other names Bis(Pentamethylcyclopentadienyl)titanium dichloride

Identifiers
CAS Number	11136-36-0
3D model (JSmol)	Interactive image
ChemSpider	22504666
ECHA InfoCard	100.149.726
PubChem CID	129692992
CompTox Dashboard (EPA)	DTXSID00747928
- InChI: InChI=1S/2C10H20.2ClH.Ti/c2*1-6-7(2)9(4)10(5)8(6)3;;;/h2*6-10H,1-5H3;2*1H;/q;;;;+2/p-2 Key: HWBFYOZNVALDJL-UHFFFAOYSA-L
- SMILES: C[C-]1C(=C(C(=C1C)C)C)C.C[C-]1C(=C(C(=C1C)C)C)C.[Cl-].Cl[Cl-][Ti+4]

Properties
Chemical formula	C_{20}H_{30}Cl_{2}Ti
Molar mass	389.23 g·mol^{−1}
Appearance	red solid
Density	1.32 g/cm^{3}
Melting point	190 °C (374 °F; 463 K)
- Except where otherwise noted, data are given for materials in their standard state (at 25 °C [77 °F], 100 kPa). Infobox references

Decamethyltitanocene dichloride is an organotitanium compound with the formula Cp*_{2}TiCl_{2} (where Cp* is C_{5}(CH_{3})_{5}, derived from pentamethylcyclopentadiene). It is a red solid that is soluble in nonpolar organic solvents. The complex has been the subject of extensive research. It is a precursor to many organotitanium complexes. The complex is related to titanocene dichloride, which lacks the methyl groups.

== Synthesis and reactions ==
The complex is prepared by the reaction of titanium tetrachloride with LiCp*. An intermediate in this synthesis is (pentamethylcyclopentadienyl)titanium trichloride.

Reduction of Cp*_{2}TiCl_{2} in the presence of ethylene gives the adduct Cp*_{2}Ti(C_{2}H_{4}). The analogous Cp compound has not been prepared, a contrast that highlights the advantages of the Cp* ligand. This pentamethylcyclopentadienyl (Cp*) species undergoes many reactions such as cycloadditions of alkynes.

The dicarbonyl complex Cp*_{2}Ti(CO)_{2} is prepared by reduction of Cp*_{2}TiCl_{2} in the presence of carbon monoxide.
