= Half sandwich compound =

Class of coordination compounds

Half sandwich compounds, also known as piano stool complexes, are organometallic complexes that feature a cyclic polyhapto ligand bound to an ML_{n} center, where L is a unidentate ligand. Thousands of such complexes are known. Well-known examples include cyclobutadieneiron tricarbonyl and (C_{5}H_{5})TiCl_{3}. Commercially useful examples include (C_{5}H_{5})Co(CO)_{2}, which is used in the synthesis of substituted pyridines, and methylcyclopentadienyl manganese tricarbonyl, an antiknock agent in petrol.

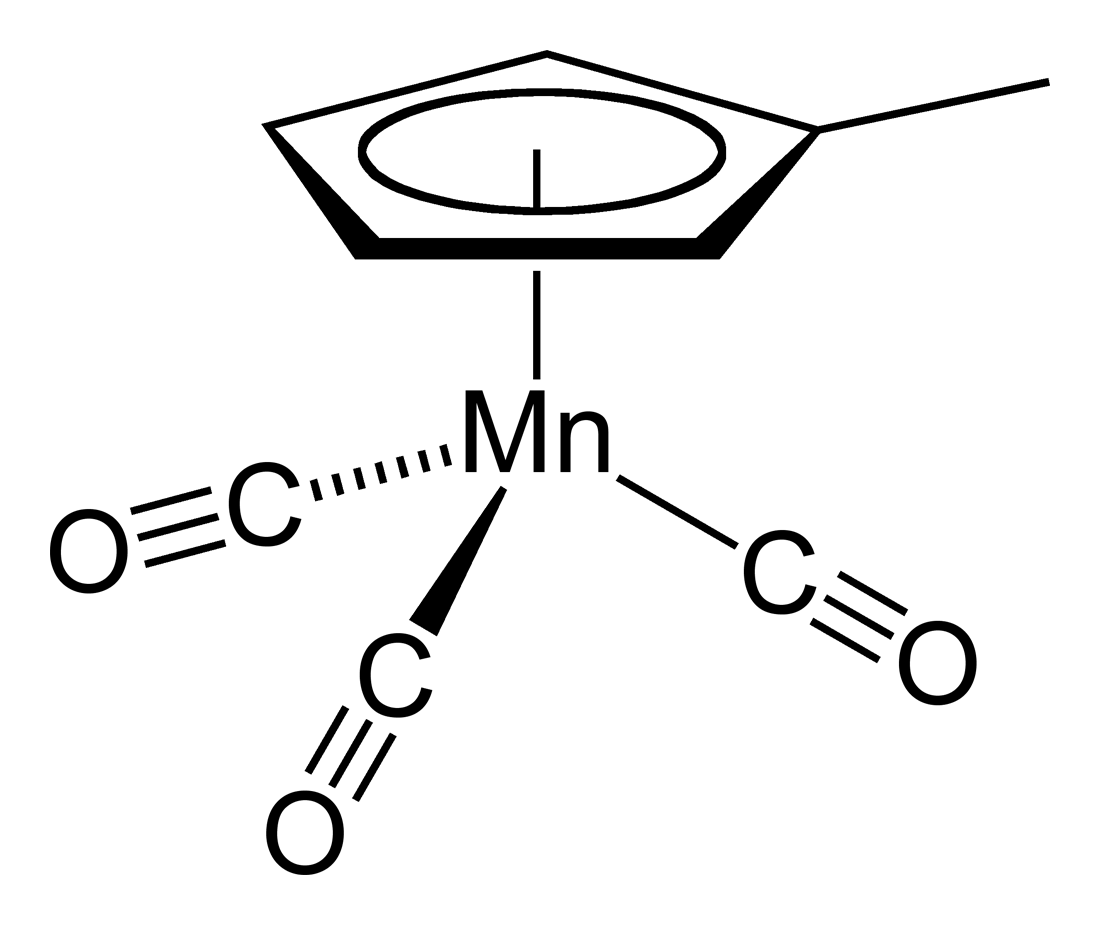
MMT is a commercially useful antiknock compound.

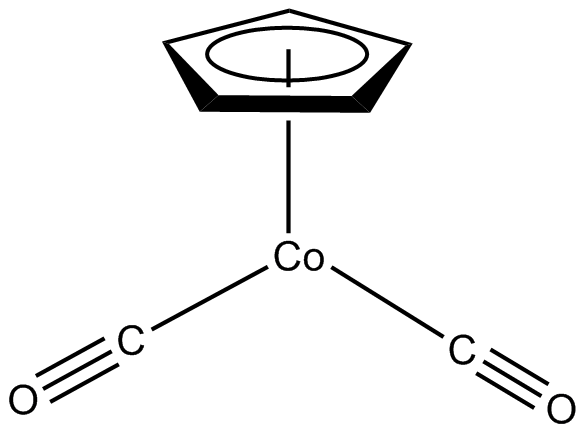
CpCo(CO)_{2} is a catalyst for the synthesis of pyridines.

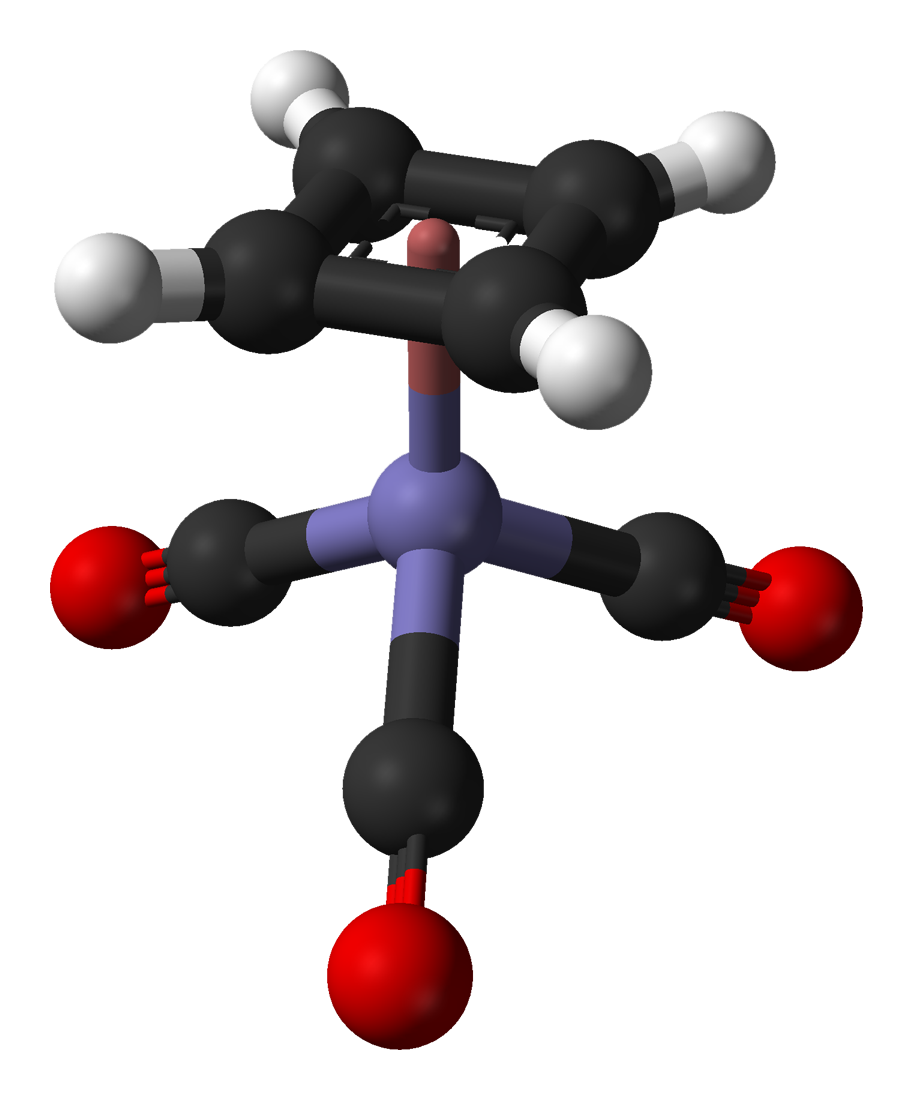
(C_{4}H_{4})Fe(CO)_{3}.

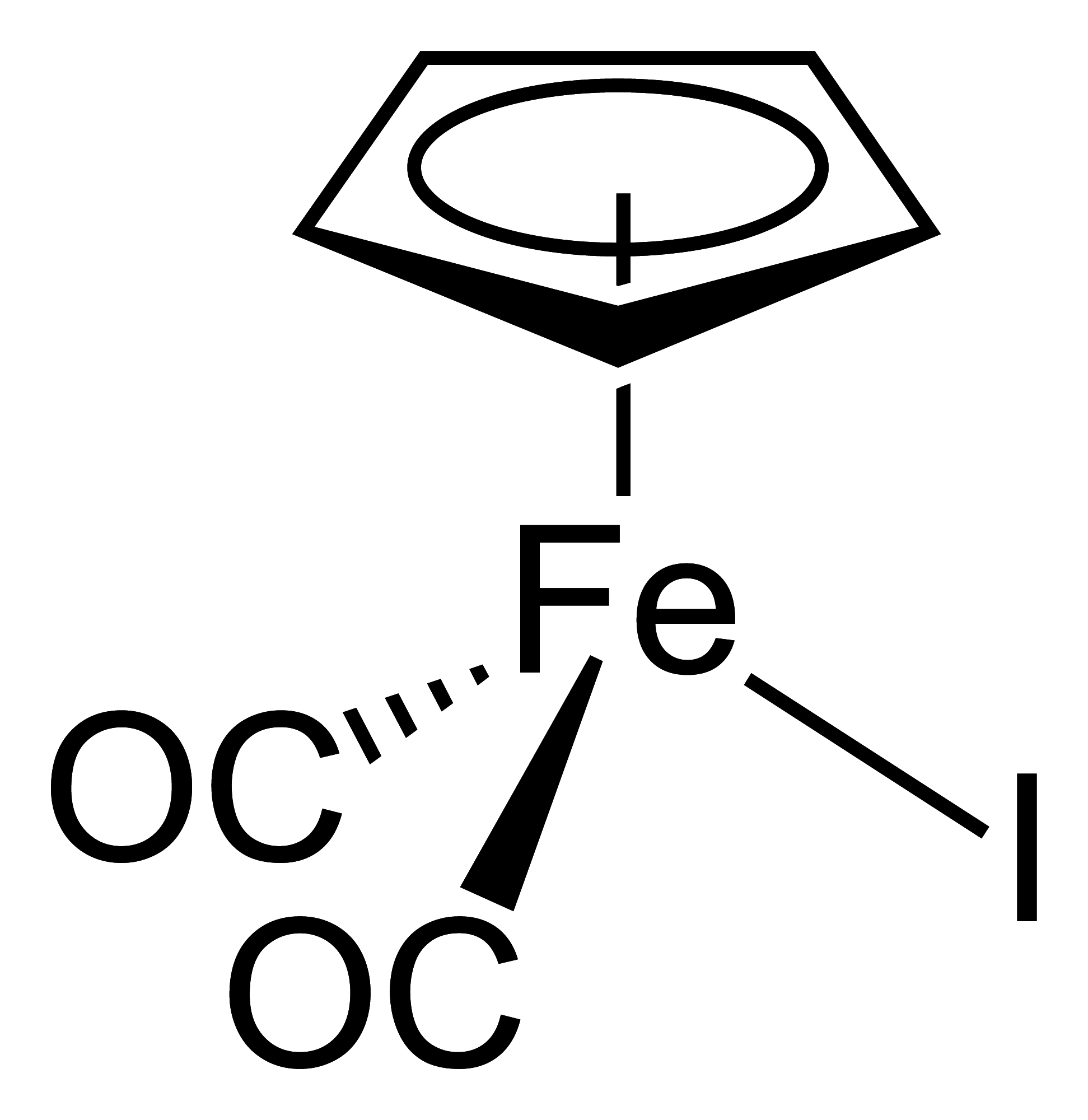
CpFe(CO)_{2}I is an example of a piano stool complex with two different monodentate ligands.

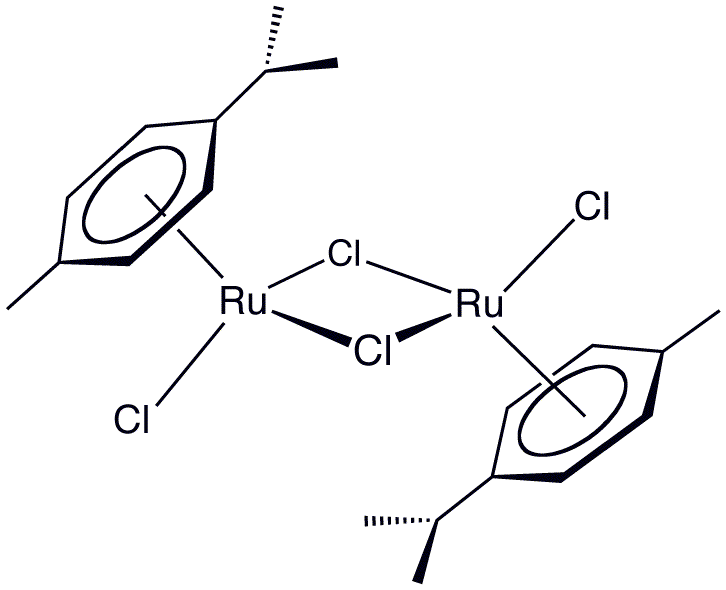
The diruthenium of cymene is readily cleaved by ligands to give monoRu half-sandwich derivatives.

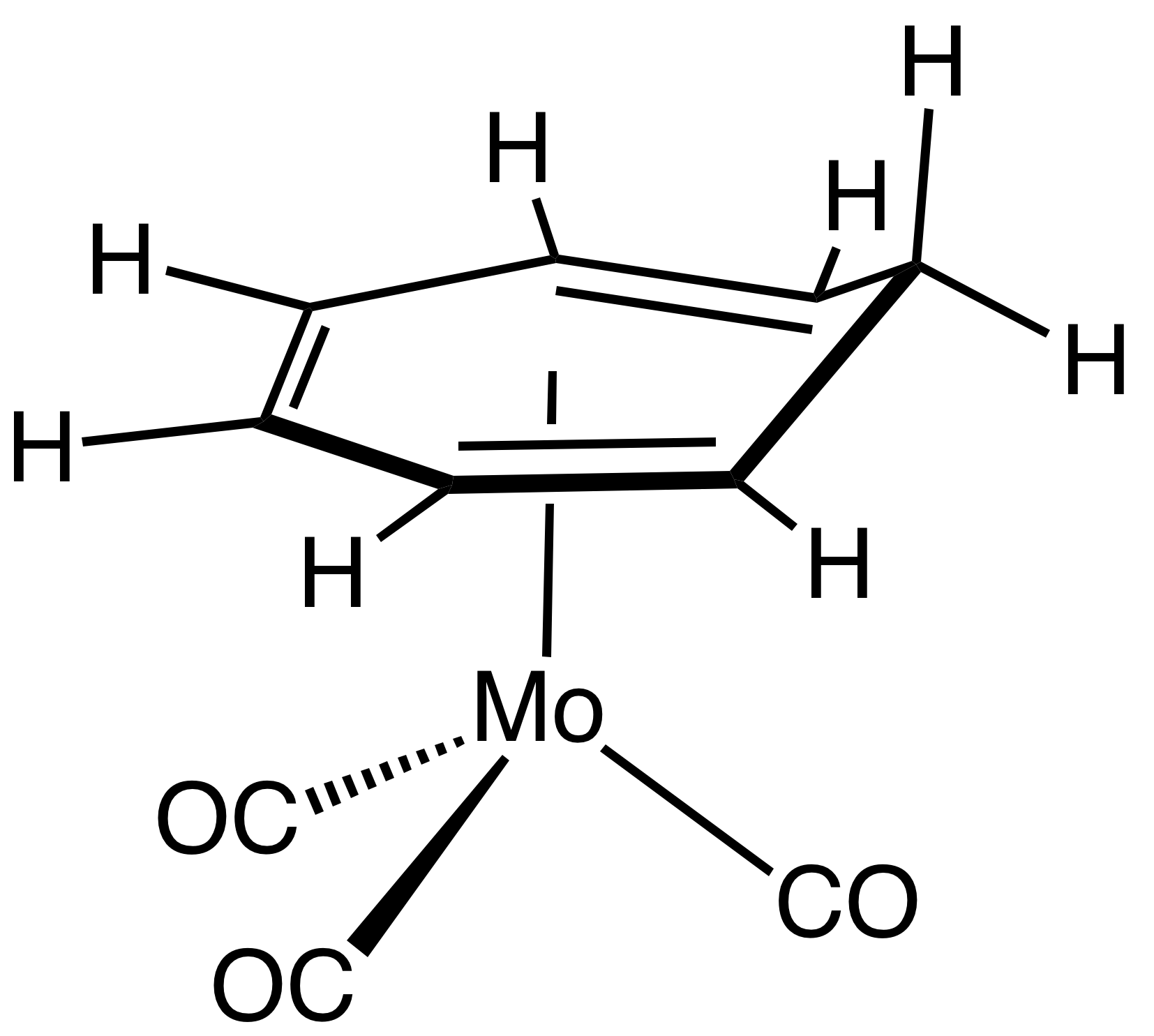
Cycloheptatriene molybdenum tricarbonyl

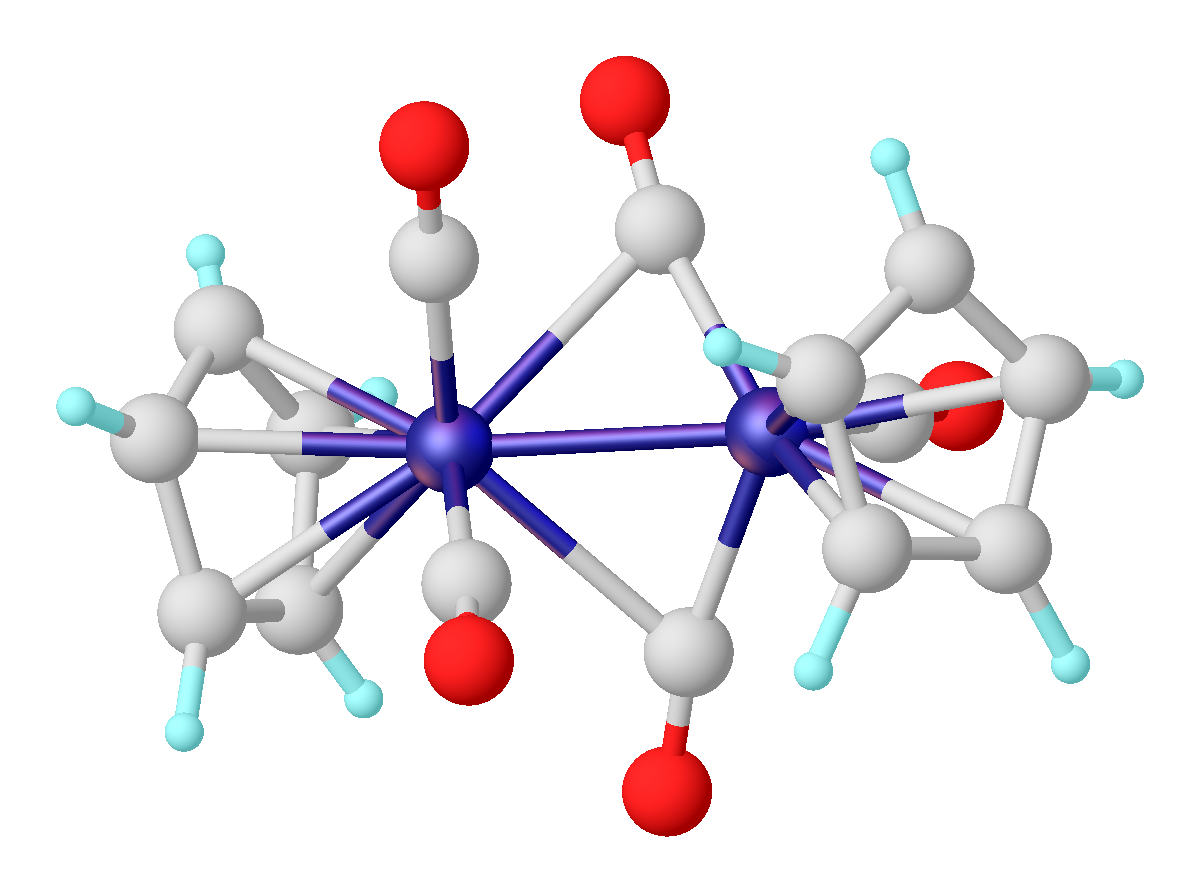
Cp_{2}V_{2}(CO)_{5} featuring a pair of semi-bridging CO ligands.

== (η^{5}-C_{5}H_{5}) piano stool compounds ==
Half sandwich complexes containing cyclopentadienyl ligands are common. Well studied examples include (η^{5}-C_{5}H_{5})V(CO)_{4}, (η^{5}-C_{5}H_{5})Cr(CO)_{3}H, (η^{5}-CH_{3}C_{5}H_{4})Mn(CO)_{3}, (η^{5}-C_{5}H_{5})Cr(CO)_{3}H, [(η^{5}-C_{5}H_{5})Fe(CO)_{3}]^{+}, (η^{5}-C_{5}H_{5})V(CO)_{4}I, and (η^{5}-C_{5}H_{5})Ru(NCMe)^{+}_{3}. (η^{5}-C_{5}H_{5})Co(CO)_{2} is a two-legged piano stool complex. Bulky cyclopentadienyl ligands such as 1,2,4-C_{5}H_{2}(tert-Bu)_{3}^{−} form unusual half-sandwich complexes.

== (η^{6}-C_{6}H_{6}) piano stool compounds ==
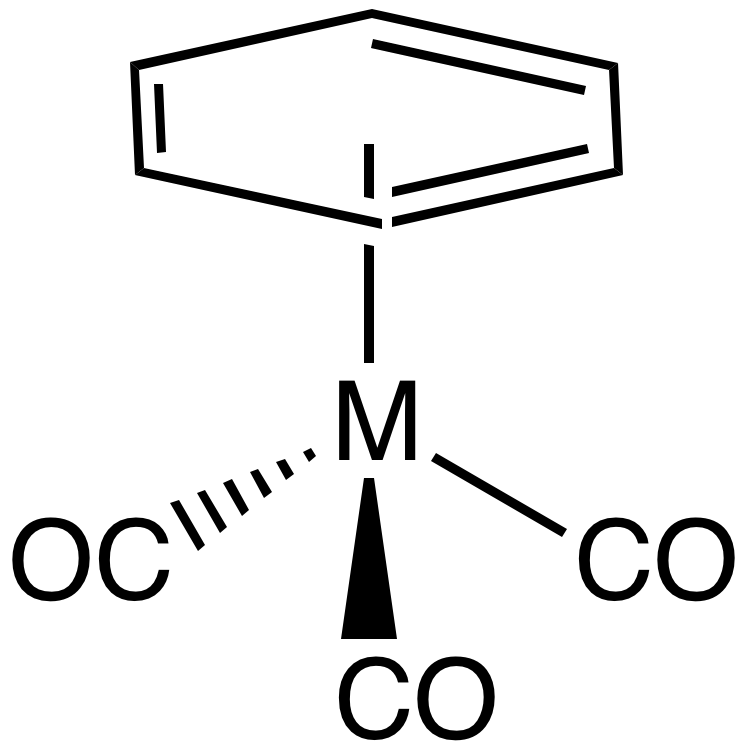

In organometallic chemistry, (η^{6}-C_{6}H_{6}) piano stool compounds are half-sandwich compounds with (η^{6}-C_{6}H_{6})ML_{3} structure (M = Cr, Mo, W, Mn(I), Re(I) and L = typically CO). (η^{6}-C_{6}H_{6}) piano stool complexes are stable 18-electron coordination compounds with a variety of chemical and material applications. Early studies on (η^{6}-C_{6}H_{6})Cr(CO)_{3} were carried out by Natta, Ercoli and Calderazzo, and Fischer and Ofele, and the crystal structure was determined by Corradini and Allegra in 1959. The X-ray data indicate that the plane of the benzene ring is nearly parallel to the plane defined by the oxygen atoms of the carbonyl ligands, and so the structure resembles a benzene seat mounted on three carbonyl legs tethered by the metal atom.

=== Cr and Mn(I) (η^{6}-C_{6}H_{6}) piano stool complexes ===
Piano stool complexes of the type (η^{6}-C_{6}H_{6})M(CO)_{3} are typically synthesized by heating the appropriate metal carbonyl compound with benzene. Alternately, the same compounds can be obtained by carbonylation of the bis(arene) sandwich compounds, such as (η^{6}-C_{6}H_{6})_{2}M compound with the metal carbonyl compound. This second approach may be more appropriate for arene ligands containing thermally fragile substituents.

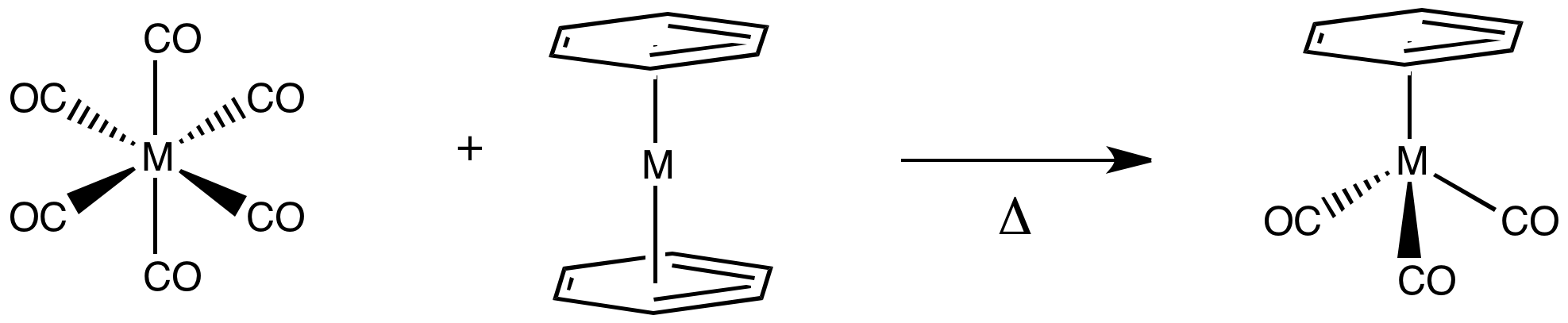

==== Reactivity of (η^{6}-C_{6}H_{6})Cr(CO)_{3} ====
The benzene ligand in (η^{6}-C_{6}H_{6})Cr(CO)_{3} is prone to deprotonation. For example, Organolithium compounds form adducts featuring cyclohexadienyl ligands. Subsequent oxidation of the complex results in the release of a substituted benzene. Oxidation of the chromium atom by I_{2} and other iodine reagents has been shown to promote exchange of arene ligands, but the intermediate chromium iodide species has not been characterized.

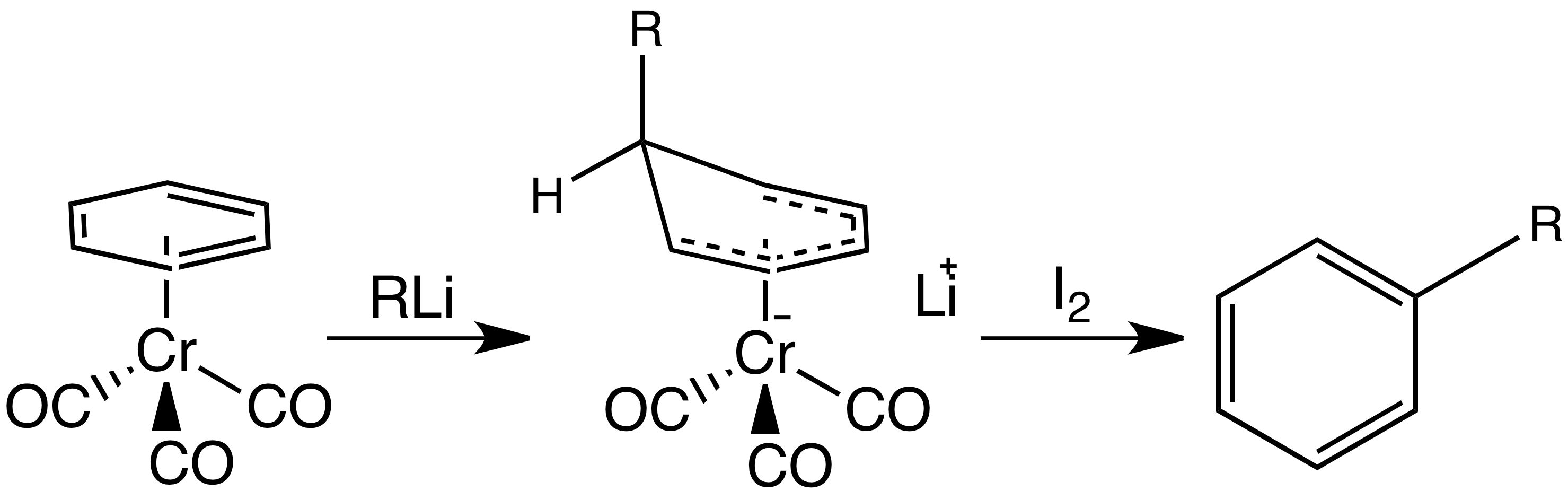

(η^{6}-C_{6}H_{6})Cr(CO)_{3} complexes exhibit "cine" and "tele" nucleophilic aromatic addition. Processes of this type involve reaction of (η^{6}-C_{6}H_{6})Cr(CO)_{3} with an alkyl lithium reagent. Subsequent treatment with an acid results in the addition of a nucleophile to the benzene ring at a site ortho ("cine"), meta or para ("tele") to the ipso carbon (see Arene substitution patterns).

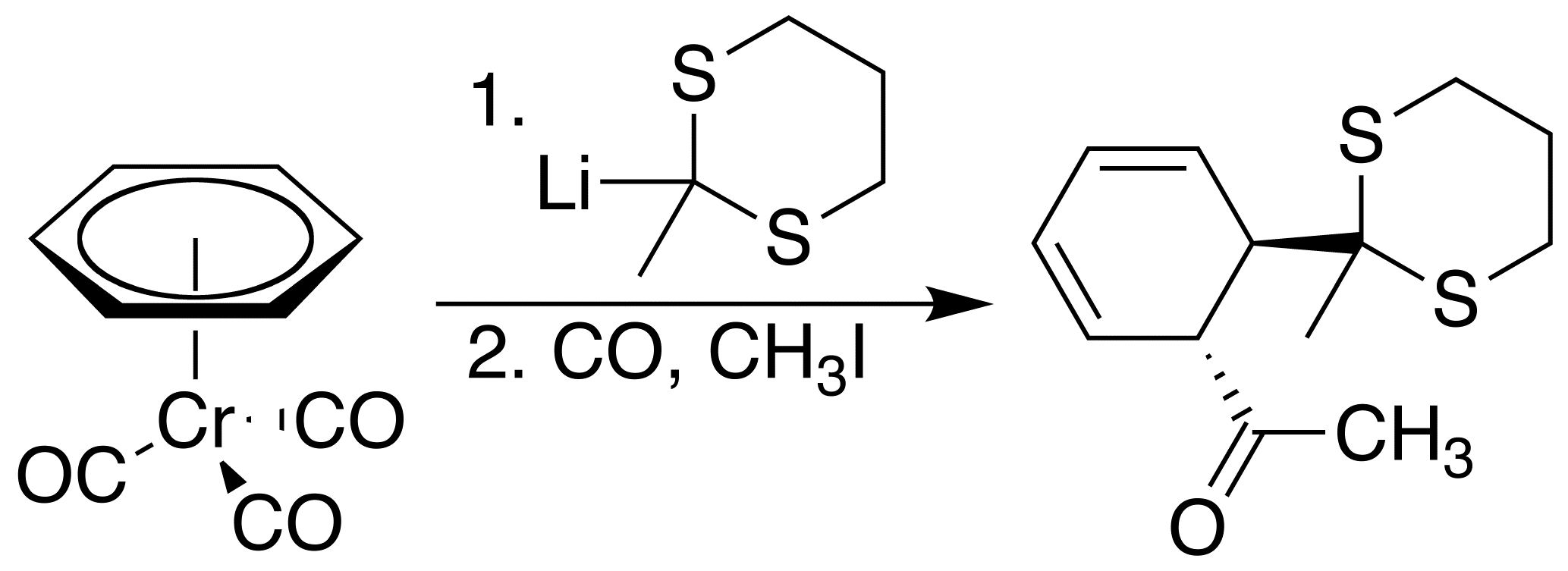

Reflecting its increased acidity, the benzene ligand can be lithiated with n-butyllithium. The resulting organolithium compound serves as a nucleophile in various reactions, for example, with trimethylsilyl chloride:

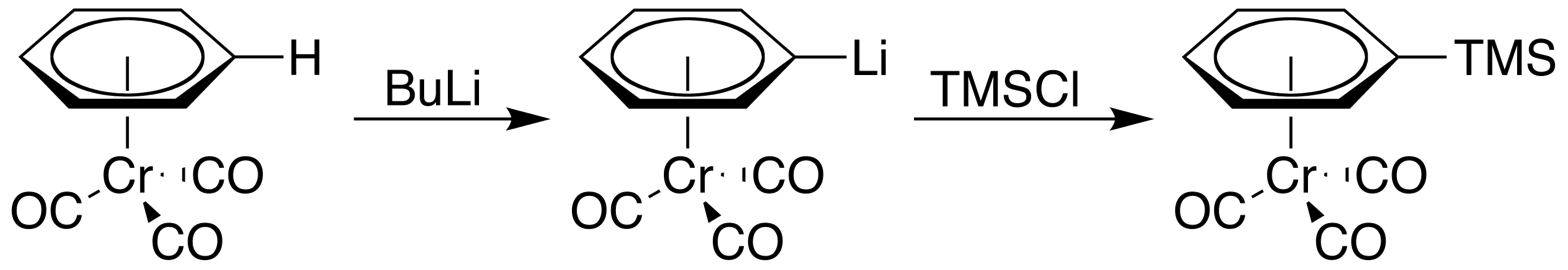

(η^{6}-C_{6}H_{6})Cr(CO)_{3} is a useful catalyst for the hydrogenation of 1,3-dienes. The product alkene results from 1,4-addition of hydrogen. The complex does not hydrogenate isolated double bonds.

A variety of arenes ligands have been installed aside from benzene. Weakly coordinating ligands may be employed to improve ligand exchange and thus the turnover rates for (η^{6}-C_{6}H_{6})M(CO)_{3} complexes.(η^{6}-C_{6}H_{6})M(CO)_{3} complexes have been incorporated into high surface area porous materials.

(η^{6}-C_{6}H_{6})M(CO)_{3} complexes serve as models for the interaction of metal carbonyls with graphene and carbon nanotubes. The presence of M(CO)_{3} on extended π-network materials has been shown to improve electrical conductivity across the material.

==== Reactivity of [(η^{6}-C_{6}H_{6})Mn(CO)_{3}]^{+} ====
Typical arene tricarbonyl piano stool complexes of Mn(I) and Re(I) are cationic and thus exhibit enhanced reactivity toward nucleophiles. Subsequent to nucleophilic addition, the modified arene can be recovered from the metal.

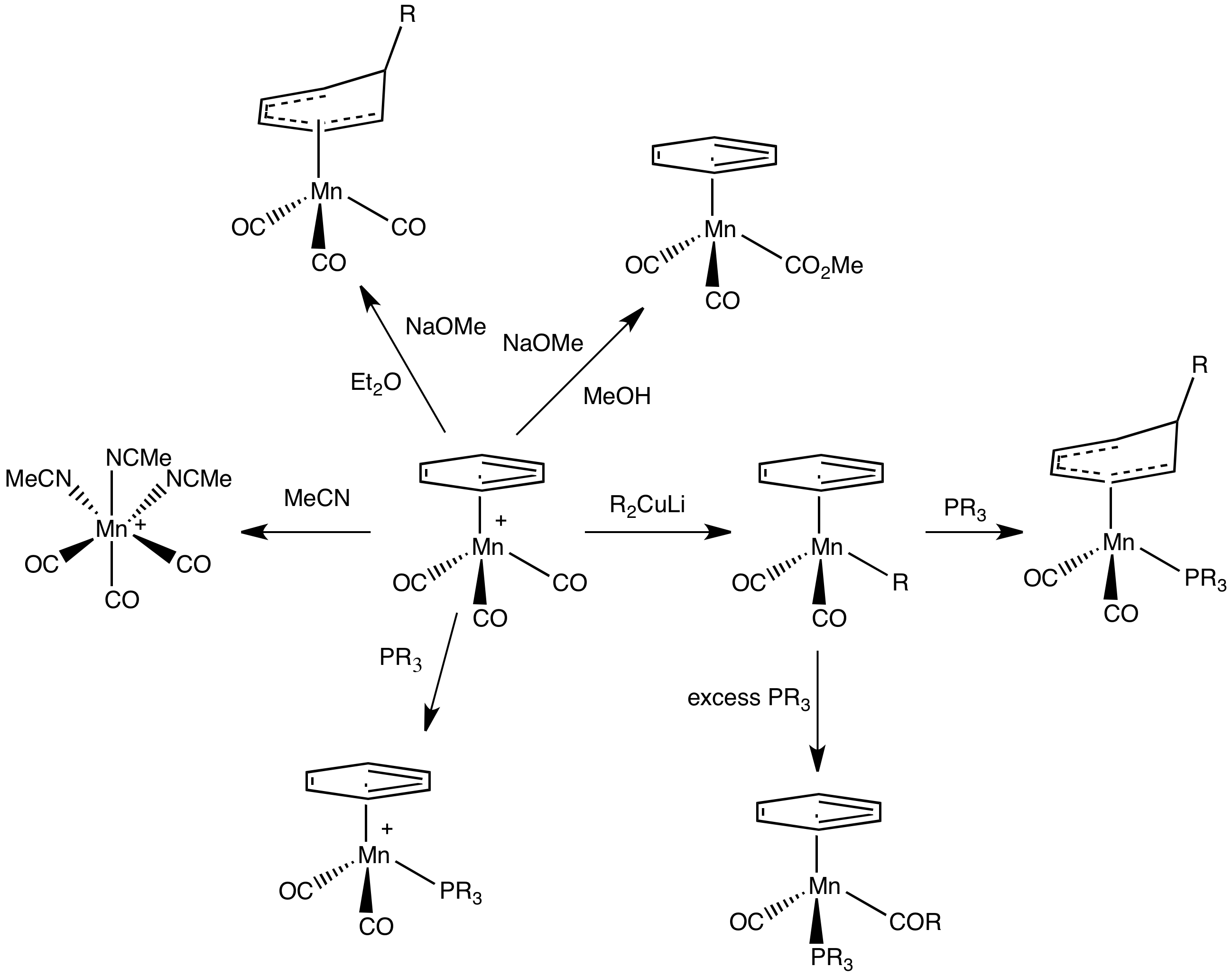

=== (η^{6}-C_{6}H_{6})Ru complexes ===
Half-sandwich compounds employing Ru(II), such as (cymene)ruthenium dichloride dimer, have been mainly investigated as catalysts for transfer hydrogenation. These complexes feature three coordination sites that are susceptible to substitution, while the arene ligand is tightly bonded and protects the metal against oxidation to Ru(III). They are prepared by reaction of RuCl_{3}·x(H_{2}O) with 1,3-cyclohexadienes. Work is also conducted on their potential as anticancer drugs.

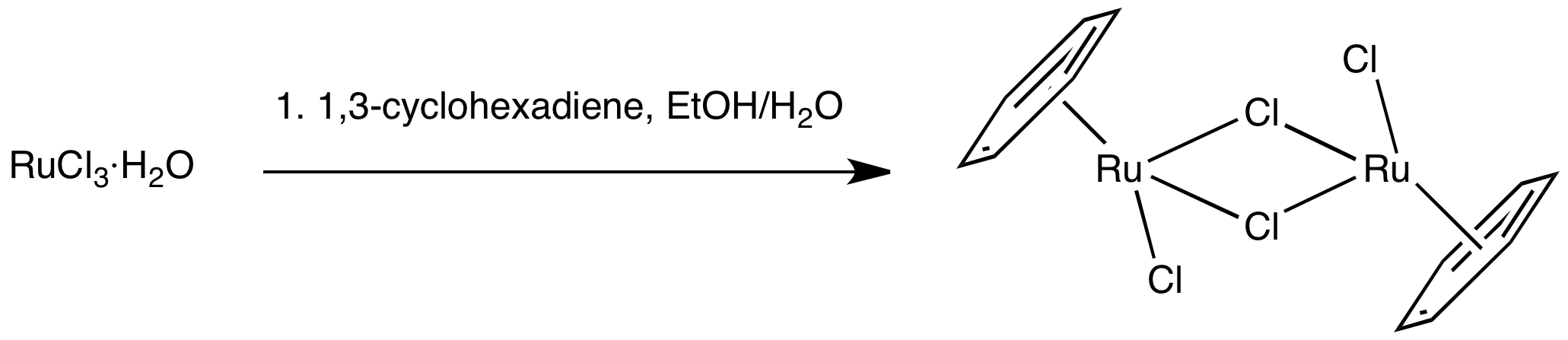

(η^{6}-C_{6}H_{6})RuCl_{2} readily undergoes ligand exchange via cleavage of the chloride bridges, making this complex a versatile precursor to Ru(II) piano stool derivatives.
