= (Cyclopentadienyl)zirconium trichloride =

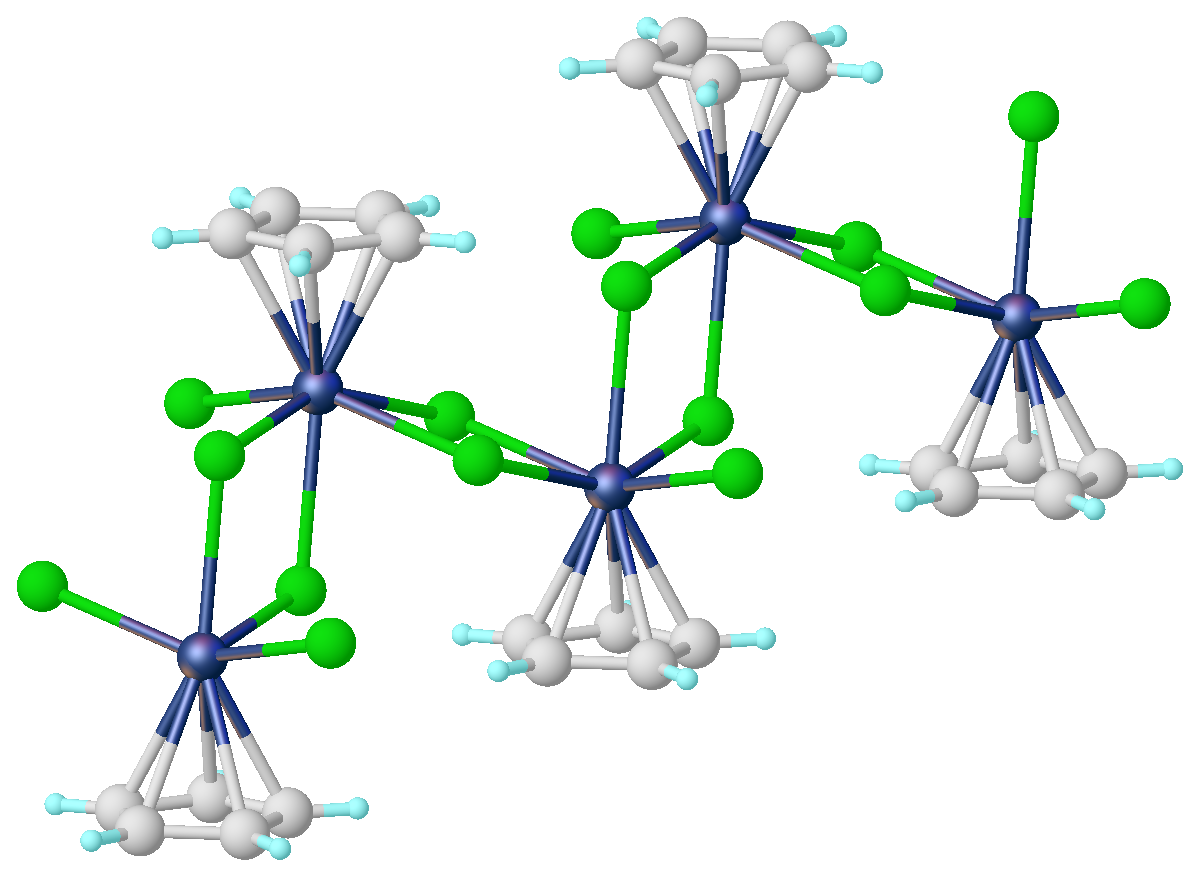

Identifiers
| CAS Number | 34767-44-7 |
| 3D model (JSmol) | Interactive image |
| ChemSpider | 24589200 |
| ECHA InfoCard | 100.154.012 |
| EC Number | 625-524-2 |
| PubChem CID | 56846602 |
- InChI: InChI=1S/C5H5.3ClH.Zr/c1-2-4-5-3-1;;;;/h1-3H,4H2;3*1H;/q-1;;;;+4/p-3 Key: MYLJKJHBXQNZMW-UHFFFAOYSA-K
- SMILES: C1C=CC=[C-]1.[Cl-].[Cl-].[Cl-].[Zr+4]

Properties
| Chemical formula | C_{5}H_{5}Cl_{3}Zr |
| Molar mass | 262.67 g·mol^{−1} |
| Appearance | white solid |
| Density | 2.31 g/cm^{3} |
- Except where otherwise noted, data are given for materials in their standard state (at 25 °C [77 °F], 100 kPa). Infobox references

(Cyclopentadienyl)zirconium trichloride is an organozirconium compound with the formula (C_{5}H_{5})ZrCl_{3}. It a moisture-sensitive white solid. The compound adopts a polymeric structure. The compound has been well studied spectroscopically.

== Synthesis and reactions ==
It is prepared by chlorination of zirconocene dichloride. Being polymeric, complex is insoluble in nonpolar solvents. It dissolves in the presence of basic ligands to give adducts.

== See also ==
- (Cyclopentadienyl)titanium trichloride, which exists as a monomer.
