= (Benzene)ruthenium dichloride dimer =

(benzene)ruthenium dichloride dimer
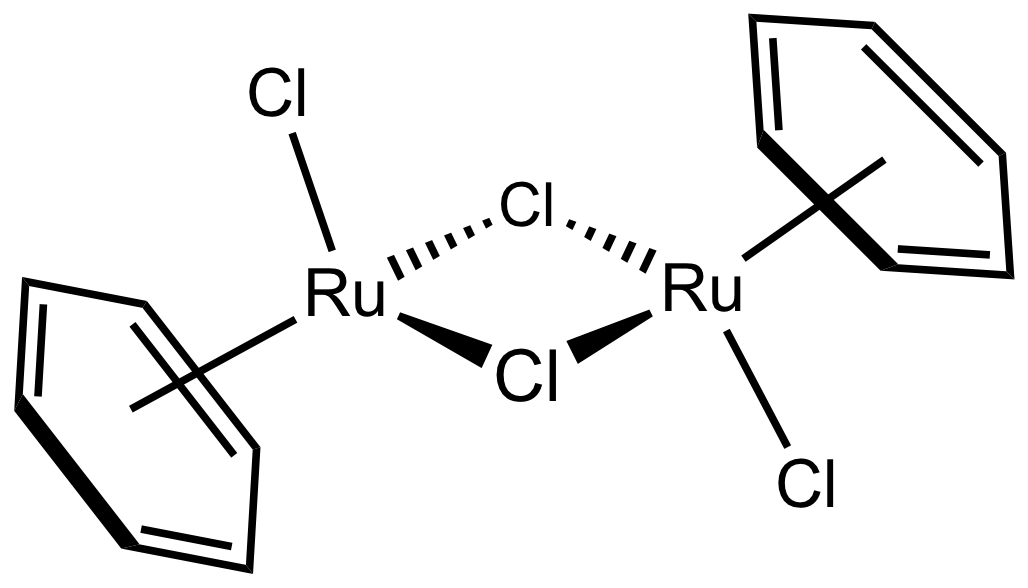

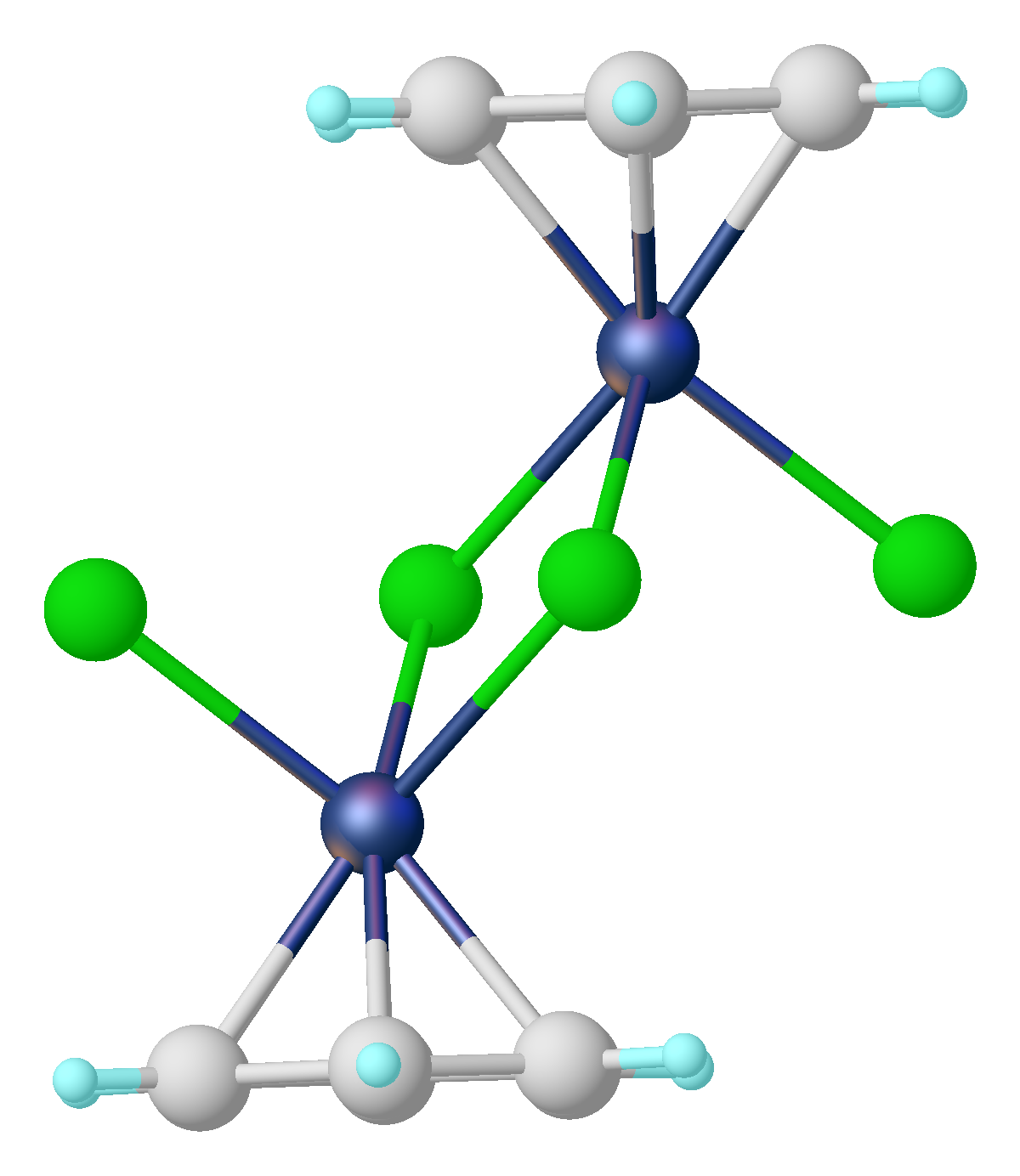

Names
- Other names Dichloro(benzene)ruthenium(II) dimer, bis(η6-benzene)di-μ-chlorodichlorodiruthenium, (benzene)dichlororuthenium dimer, benzeneruthenium dichloride dimer, benzeneruthenium(II) chloride dimer

Identifiers
CAS Number	37366-09-9
3D model (JSmol)	Interactive image
ChemSpider	9137359
ECHA InfoCard	100.155.159
EC Number	626-792-3
PubChem CID	10962144
CompTox Dashboard (EPA)	DTXSID40449898
- InChI: InChI=1S/2C6H6.4ClH.2Ru/c2*1-2-4-6-5-3-1;;;;;;/h2*1-6H;4*1H;;/q;;;;;;2*+2/p-4 Key: YGXMUPKIEHNBNQ-UHFFFAOYSA-J
- SMILES: C1=CC=CC=C1.C1=CC=CC=C1.Cl[Ru]Cl.Cl[Ru]Cl

Properties
Chemical formula	C_{12}H_{12}Cl_{4}Ru_{2}
Molar mass	500.17 g·mol^{−1}
Appearance	Red-brown solid
Density	2.343 g/cm^{3}
Melting point	decomposes
Solubility in water	Slightly, with hydrolysis

Hazards
- GHS labelling
Pictograms	(GHS07: Exclamation mark)
Signal word	Warning
Hazard statements	H315, H319, H335
Precautionary statements	P261, P264, P271, P280, P302+P352, P304+P340, P305+P351+P338, P312, P321, P332+P313, P337+P313, P362, P403+P233, P405, P501
- Except where otherwise noted, data are given for materials in their standard state (at 25 °C [77 °F], 100 kPa). verify (what is ?) Infobox references

(Benzene)ruthenium dichloride dimer is the organoruthenium compound with the formula [(C_{6}H_{6})RuCl_{2}]_{2}. This red-coloured, diamagnetic solid is a reagent in organometallic chemistry and homogeneous catalysis.

== Preparation, structure, and reactions ==
The dimer is prepared by the reaction of cyclohexadienes with hydrated ruthenium trichloride. As verified by X-ray crystallography, each Ru center is coordinated to three chloride ligands and a η^{6}-benzene. The complex can be viewed as an edge-shared bioctahedral structure.

(Benzene)ruthenium dichloride dimer reacts with Lewis bases to give monometallic adducts:

[(C_{6}H_{6})RuCl_{2}]_{2} + 2 PPh_{3} → 2 (C_{6}H_{6})RuCl_{2}(PPh_{3})

== Related compounds ==
- (Cymene)ruthenium dichloride dimer, a more soluble analogue of (benzene)ruthenium dichloride dimer.
- (Mesitylene)ruthenium dichloride dimer, another more soluble derivative.
