= Phellandrene =

Phellandrenes
α-Phellandrene
α-Phellandrene
β-Phellandrene
β-Phellandrene

Names
- IUPAC names (α): 2-Methyl-5-(propan-2-yl)cyclohexa-1,3-diene (β): 3-Methylidene-6-(propan-2-yl)cyclohex-1-ene

Identifiers
CAS Number	(α): 99-83-2; (β): 555-10-2; (−)-(α): 4221-98-1; (+)-(α): 2243-33-6; (−)-(β): 6153-17-9; (+)-(β): 6153-16-8
3D model (JSmol)	(α): Interactive image; (β): Interactive image; (−)-(α): Interactive image; (+)-(α): Interactive image
ChEBI	(β): CHEBI:48741; (−)-(α): CHEBI:301; (+)-(α): CHEBI:367; (−)-(β): CHEBI:129; (+)-(β): CHEBI:53
ChemSpider	(α): 7180; (β): 10669
ECHA InfoCard	100.014.121
EC Number	(α): 202-792-5; (β): 209-081-9; (−)-(α): 224-167-6
KEGG	(−)-(α): C09875; (+)-(α): C11391; (−)-(β): C11392; (+)-(β): C09877
PubChem CID	(α): 7460; (β): 11142; (−)-(α): 442482; (+)-(α): 443160; (−)-(β): 443161
UNII	(α): 49JV13XE39; (β): 2KK225M001; (−)-(α): 56UV8X65K0; (+)-(α): E45FS72C5K
CompTox Dashboard (EPA)	(α): DTXSID8051673
- InChI: (α): InChI=1S/C10H16/c1-8(2)10-6-4-9(3)5-7-10/h4-6,8,10H,7H2,1-3H3 Key: OGLDWXZKYODSOB-UHFFFAOYSA-N; (β): InChI=1S/C10H16/c1-8(2)10-6-4-9(3)5-7-10/h4,6,8,10H,3,5,7H2,1-2H3 Key: LFJQCDVYDGGFCH-UHFFFAOYSA-N; (−)-(α): InChI=1S/C10H16/c1-8(2)10-6-4-9(3)5-7-10/h4-6,8,10H,7H2,1-3H3/t10-/m1/s1 Key: OGLDWXZKYODSOB-SNVBAGLBSA-N; (+)-(α): InChI=1S/C10H16/c1-8(2)10-6-4-9(3)5-7-10/h4-6,8,10H,7H2,1-3H3/t10-/m0/s1 Key: OGLDWXZKYODSOB-JTQLQIEISA-N
- SMILES: (α): CC1=CCC(C=C1)C(C)C; (β): CC(C)C1CCC(=C)C=C1; (−)-(α): CC1=CC[C@@H](C=C1)C(C)C; (+)-(α): CC1=CC[C@H](C=C1)C(C)C

Properties
Chemical formula	C_{10}H_{16}
Molar mass	136.24 g/mol
Appearance	Colorless oil (α and β)
Density	α: 0.846 g/cm^{3} β: 0.85 g/cm^{3}
Boiling point	α: 171–172 °C β: 171–172 °C
Solubility in water	Insoluble (α and β)

Hazards
- GHS labelling
Pictograms	(GHS02: Flammable) (GHS08: Health hazard)
Signal word	Danger
Hazard statements	H226, H304
Precautionary statements	P210, P233, P240, P241, P242, P243, P280, P301+P310, P303+P361+P353, P331, P370+P378, P403+P235, P405, P501
- Except where otherwise noted, data are given for materials in their standard state (at 25 °C [77 °F], 100 kPa). verify (what is ?) Infobox references

Phellandrenes are organic compounds with the formula C_{10}H_{16}. They have a similar molecular structure and similar chemical properties. α-Phellandrene and β-phellandrene are cyclic monoterpenes and are double-bond isomers. In α-phellandrene, both double bonds are endocyclic, and in β-phellandrene, one of them is exocyclic. Both are insoluble in water, but miscible with organic solvents.

== Etymology and occurrence ==
α-Phellandrene was named after Eucalyptus phellandra, now called Eucalyptus radiata, from which it can be isolated. It is also a constituent of the essential oil of Eucalyptus dives. β-Phellandrene has been isolated from the oil of water fennel and Canada balsam oil. The main source of β-phellandrene is terpentine.

β-Pinene is a source of β-phellandrene.

== Reactions and uses ==
α-Phellandrene undergoes hydrochlorination to give phellandrene hydrochloride (a cyclohexenyl chloride). Base hydrolysis of this hydrochloride gives piperitol.

The phellandrenes are used in fragrances because of their pleasing aromas. The odor of β-phellandrene has been described as peppery-minty and slightly citrusy.

Like other cyclohexadienes, α-phellandrene reacts with ruthenium trichloride to give (cymene)ruthenium chloride dimer.

== Biosynthesis ==
The biosynthesis of phellandrene begins with dimethylallyl pyrophosphate and isopentenyl pyrophosphate condensing in an S_{N}1 reaction to form geranyl pyrophosphate. The resultant monoterpene undergoes cyclization to form a menthyl cationic species. A hydride shift then forms an allylic carbocation. Finally, an elimination reaction occurs at one of two positions, yielding either α-phellandrene or β-phellandrene.

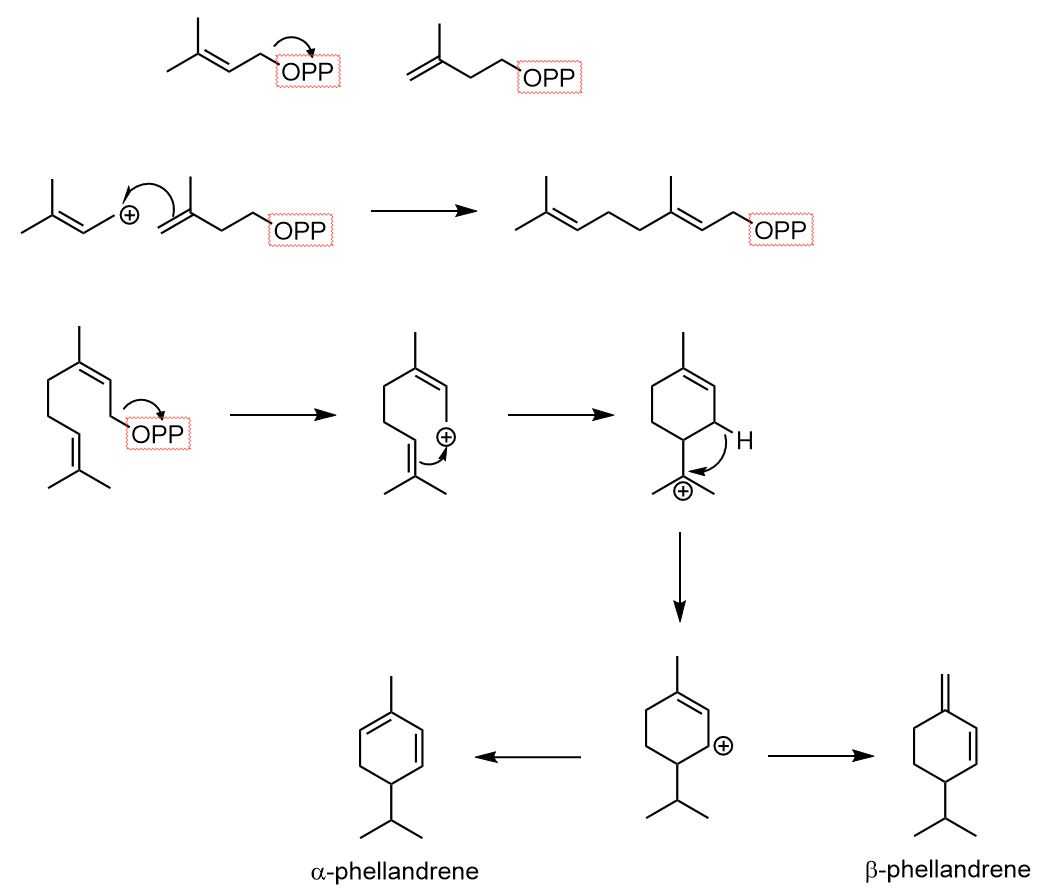

== Safety ==
The α-phellandrene isomer can form hazardous and explosive peroxides on contact with air at elevated temperatures.
