= Organoruthenium chemistry =

Organoruthenium chemistry is the chemistry of organometallic compounds containing a carbon to ruthenium chemical bond. Several organoruthenium catalysts are of commercial interest and organoruthenium compounds have been considered for cancer therapy. The chemistry has some stoichiometric similarities with organoiron chemistry, as iron is directly above ruthenium in group 8 of the periodic table. The most important reagents for the introduction of ruthenium are ruthenium(III) chloride and triruthenium dodecacarbonyl.

In its organometallic compounds, ruthenium is known to adopt oxidation states from −2 ([Ru(CO)_{4}]^{2−}) to +6 ([RuN(Me)4]^{−}). Most common are those in the +2 oxidation state, as illustrated below.

1st generation Grubbs catalyst

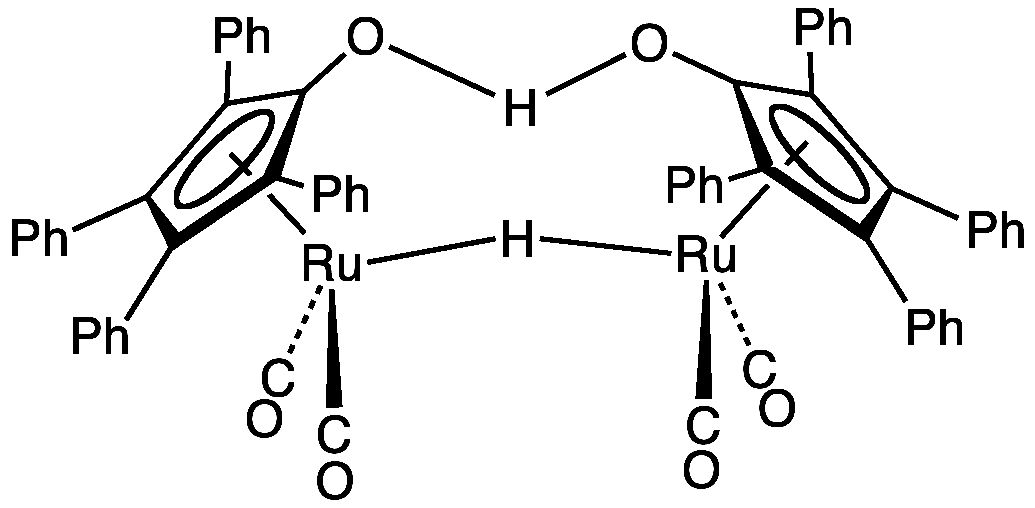
Shvo catalyst

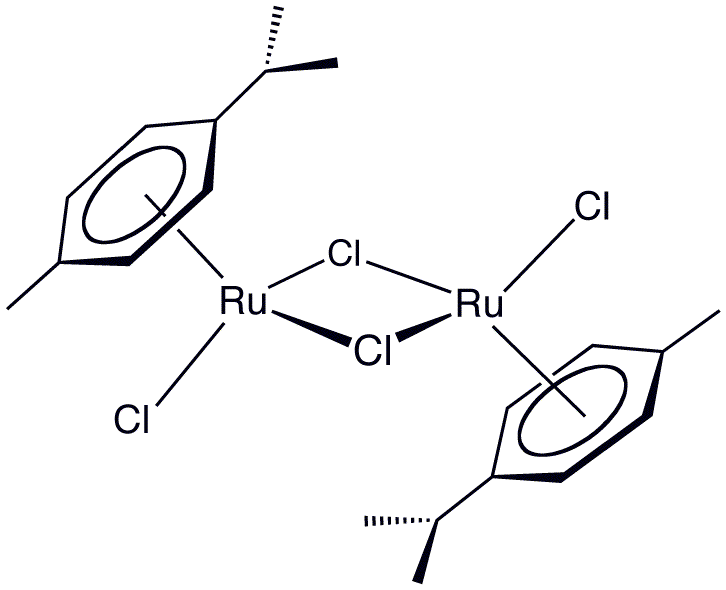
(cymene)ruthenium dichloride dimer

triruthenium dodecacarbonyl.

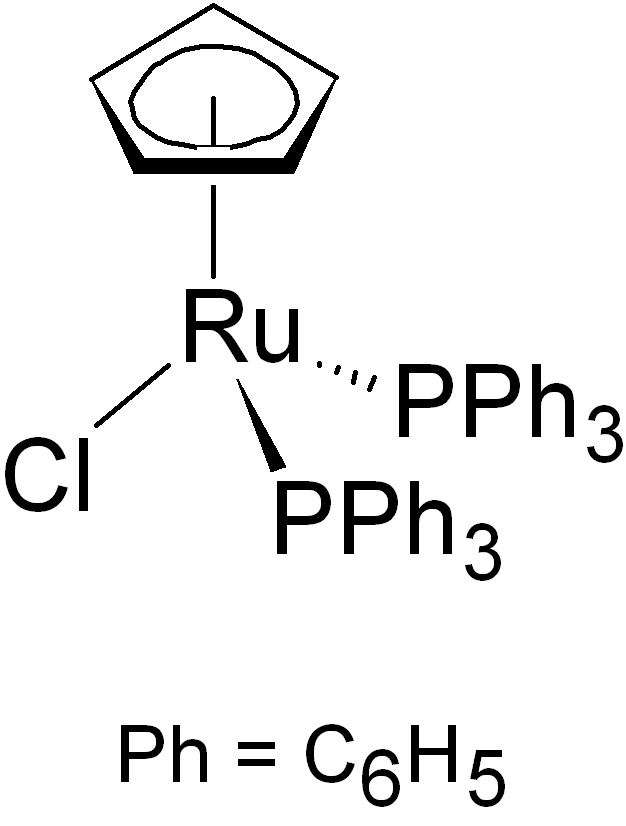
chloro(cyclopentadienyl)bis(triphenylphosphine)ruthenium

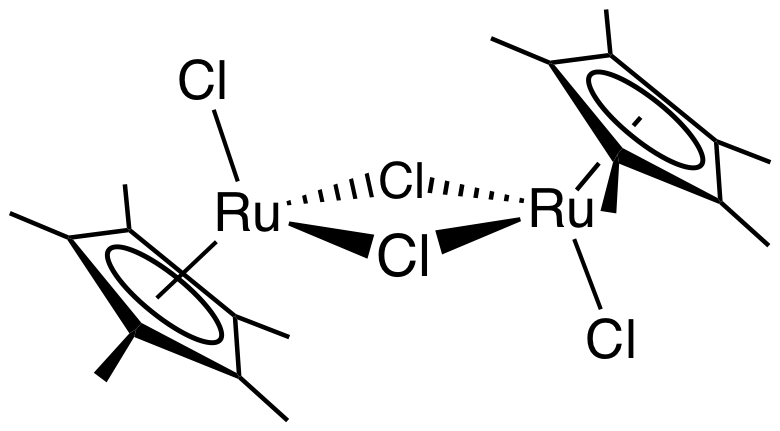
pentamethylcyclopentadienyl ruthenium dichloride dimer

== Ligands ==
As with other late transition metals, ruthenium binds more favorably with soft ligands. The most important ligands for ruthenium are:

- halides, especially chloride.
- phosphines, especially triphenylphosphine.
- N-heterocyclic carbenes (NHCs).
- cyclopentadienyl ligands.
- various arenes and dienes
- carbon monoxide.
- hydride, notably in the Shvo catalyst.
- metal carbenes, notably in the Grubbs catalyst.

=== Phosphine ligands ===
While monodentate phosphine ligands such as triphenylphosphine and tricyclohexylphosphine are most common, bidentate phosphine ligands can also be useful in organoruthenium compounds. BINAP, in particular, is a useful asymmetric ligand for many asymmetric ruthenium catalysts.

=== N-Heterocyclic carbene ligands ===
NHC ligands have become very common in organoruthenium complexes. NHC ligands can be prepared with precise steric and electronic parameters, and can be chiral for use in asymmetric catalysis. NHCs, as strongly donating L-type ligands, are often used to replace phosphine ligands. A notable example is 2nd generation Grubbs catalyst, in which a phosphine of the 1st generation catalyst is replaced by an NHC.

=== Cyclopentadienyl ligands ===
The parent compound ruthenocene is unreactive because it is coordinatively saturated and contains no reactive groups. Shvo catalyst ([Ph_{4}(η^{5}-C_{4}CO)]_{2}H]}Ru_{2}(CO)_{4}(μ-H)) is also coordinatively saturated, but features reactive OH and RuH groups that enable it to function in transfer hydrogenation. It is used in hydrogenation of aldehydes, ketones, via transfer hydrogenation, in disproportionation of aldehydes to esters and in the isomerization of allylic alcohols.

Chloro(cyclopentadienyl)bis(triphenylphosphine)ruthenium features a reactive chloro group, which is readily substituted by organic substrates.

=== Arene and alkene ligands ===
One example of an Ru-arene complex is (cymene)ruthenium dichloride dimer, which is the precursor to a versatile catalyst for transfer hydrogenation. Acenaphthylene forms a useful catalyst derived from triruthenium dodecacarbonyl. The hapticity of the hexamethylbenzene ligand in Ru(C_{6}Me_{6})_{2} depends on the oxidation state of the metal centre: The compound Ru(COD)(COT) is capable of dimerizing norbornadiene:

Norbornadiene dimerization

Multinuclear organo-ruthenium complexes have been investigated for anti-cancer properties. The compounds studied include di-, tri-, and tetra-nuclear complexes and tetrara-, hexa-, and octa- metalla-cages.

=== Carbonyls ===
The main ruthenium carbonyl is triruthenium dodecacarbonyl, Ru_{3}(CO)_{12}. The analogues of the popular reagents Fe(CO)_{5} and Fe_{2}(CO)_{9} are not very useful. Ruthenium pentacarbonyl decarbonylates readily:

Ru_{3}(CO)_{12} + 3 CO ⇌ 3 Ru(CO)_{5}

Carbonylation of ruthenium trichloride gives a series of Ru(II) chlorocarbonyls. These are the precursors to Ru_{3}(CO)_{12}.

== Organoosmium compounds ==
In the same group 8 elements osmium resembles ruthenium in its complexes. Because Os is more expensive than Ru, the chemistry is less developed and has fewer applications. Of course the cost of the catalyst is offset if turnover numbers are high. Thus, osmium tetroxide is an important oxidizing agent in organic chemistry especially in the conversion of alkenes to 1,2-diols.

The 5d-orbitals in Os are higher in energy that the 4d-orbitals in Ru. Thus, π backbonding to alkenes and CO is stronger for Os compounds, which leads to more stable organic derivatives. This effect is illustrated by the stability of the alkene derivatives of the type [Os(NH_{3})_{5}(alkene)]^{2+} or [Os(NH_{3})_{5}(arene)]^{2+} as in the example below.

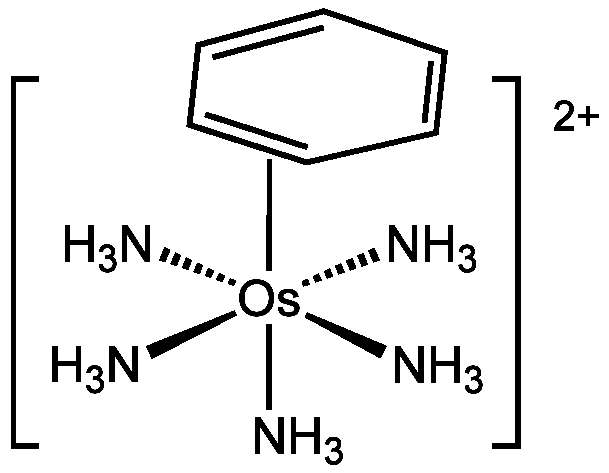

Important compounds, at least for academic studies, are the carbonyls such as triosmium dodecacarbonyl and decacarbonyldihydridotriosmium. The phosphine complexes are analogous to those or ruthenium, but hydride derivatives, e.g. OsHCl(CO)(PPh_{3})_{3}, tend to be more stable.
