= (Cymene)ruthenium dichloride dimer =

(cymene)ruthenium dichloride dimer
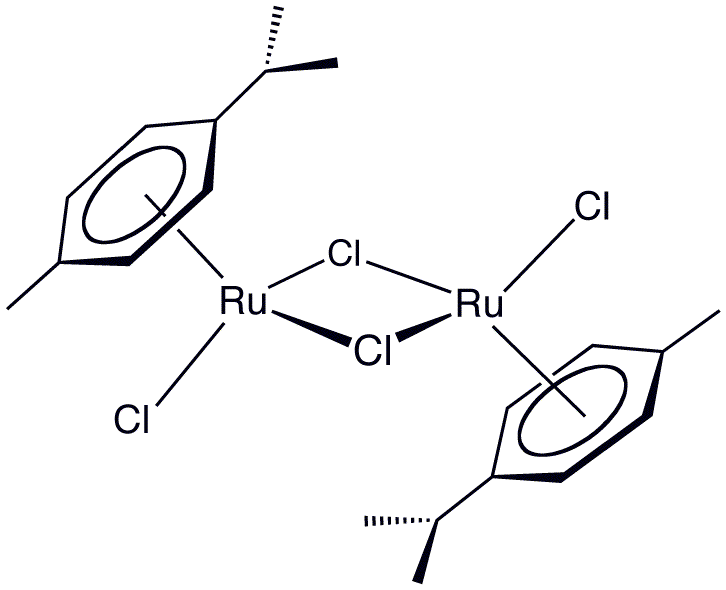

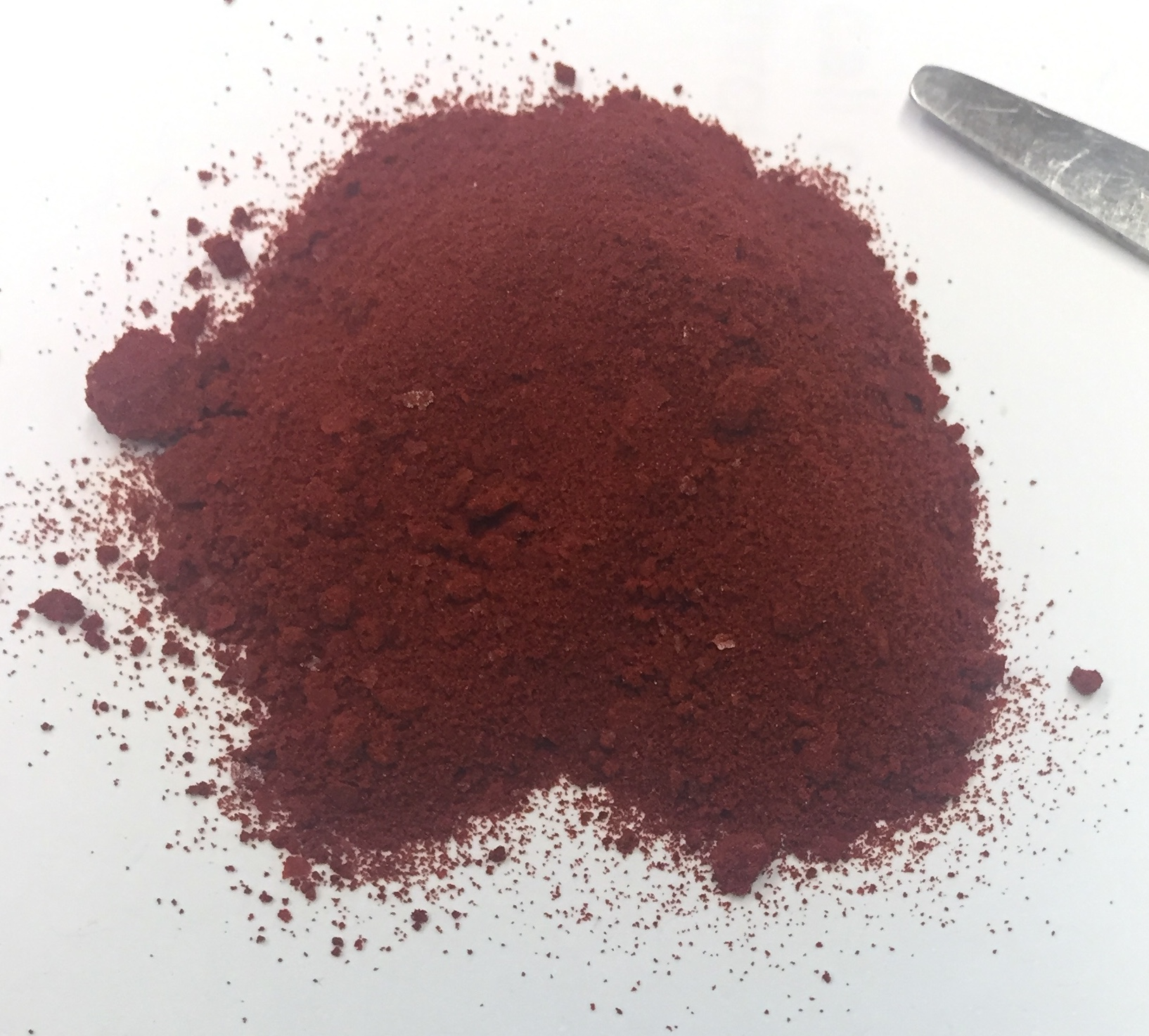

Names
- Other names Dichloro(p-cymene)ruthenium(II) dimer

Identifiers
CAS Number	52462-29-0
3D model (JSmol)	Interactive image; Interactive image
ChemSpider	8297222
ECHA InfoCard	100.103.371
PubChem CID	10121702
CompTox Dashboard (EPA)	DTXSID50447901
- InChI: InChI=1S/2C10H14.4ClH.2Ru/c2*1-8(2)10-6-4-9(3)5-7-10;;;;;;/h2*4-8H,1-3H3;4*1H;;/q;;;;;;2*+2/p-4 Key: LAXRNWSASWOFOT-UHFFFAOYSA-J; InChI=1/2C10H14.4ClH.2Ru/c2*1-8(2)10-6-4-9(3)5-7-10;;;;;;/h2*4-8H,1-3H3;4*1H;;/q;;;;;;2*+2/p-4 Key: LAXRNWSASWOFOT-XBHQNQODAM
- SMILES: [Ru+2].[Ru+2].[Cl-].[Cl-].[Cl-].[Cl-].c1cc(ccc1C(C)C)C.c1cc(ccc1C(C)C)C; Cc1ccc(cc1)C(C)C.Cc1ccc(cc1)C(C)C.[Cl-].[Cl-].[Cl-].[Cl-].[Ru+2].[Ru+2]

Properties
Chemical formula	C_{20}H_{28}Cl_{4}Ru_{2}
Molar mass	612.38 g·mol^{−1}
Appearance	Red solid
Melting point	247 to 250 °C (477 to 482 °F; 520 to 523 K) (decomposes)
Solubility in water	Slightly, with hydrolysis
- Except where otherwise noted, data are given for materials in their standard state (at 25 °C [77 °F], 100 kPa). verify (what is ?) Infobox references

(Cymene)ruthenium dichloride dimer is the organometallic compound with the formula [(cymene)RuCl_{2}]_{2}. This red-coloured, diamagnetic solid is a reagent in organometallic chemistry and homogeneous catalysis. The complex is structurally similar to (benzene)ruthenium dichloride dimer.

== Preparation and reactions ==
The dimer is prepared by the reaction of the phellandrene with hydrated ruthenium trichloride. At high temperatures, [(cymene)RuCl_{2}]_{2} exchanges with other arenes:

[(cymene)RuCl_{2}]_{2} + 2 C_{6}Me_{6} → [(C_{6}Me_{6})RuCl_{2}]_{2} + 2 cymene

(Cymene)ruthenium dichloride dimer reacts with Lewis bases to give monometallic adducts:

[(cymene)RuCl_{2}]_{2} + 2 PPh_{3} → 2 (cymene)RuCl_{2}(PPh_{3})

Such monomers adopt pseudo-octahedral piano-stool structures.

== Precursor to catalysts ==
Treatment of [(cymene)RuCl_{2}]_{2} with the chelating ligand TsDPENH gives (cymene)Ru(TsDPEN-H), a catalyst for asymmetric transfer hydrogenation.

[(cymene)RuCl_{2}]_{2} is also used to prepare catalysts (by monomerization with dppf) used in borrowing hydrogen catalysis, a catalytic reaction that is based on the activation of alcohols towards nucleophilic attack.

It can also used to prepare other ruthenium—arene complexes.
