= Bis(allyl)nickel =

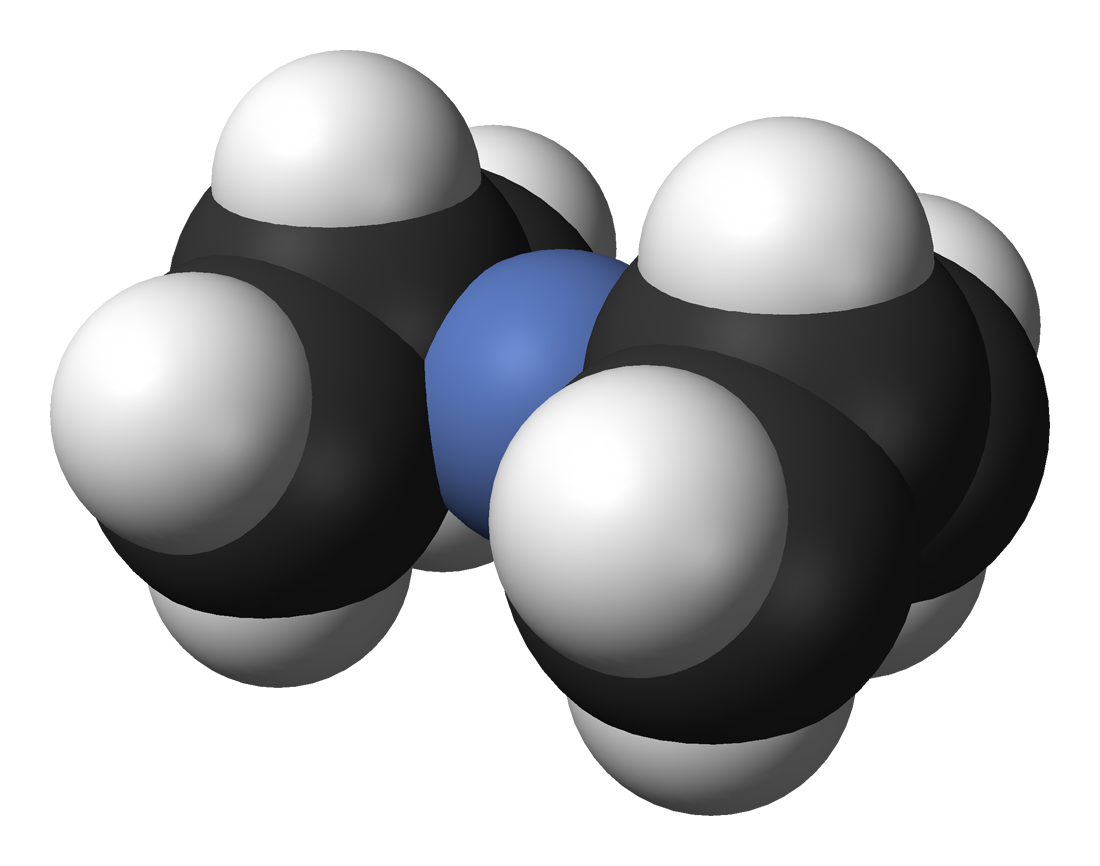

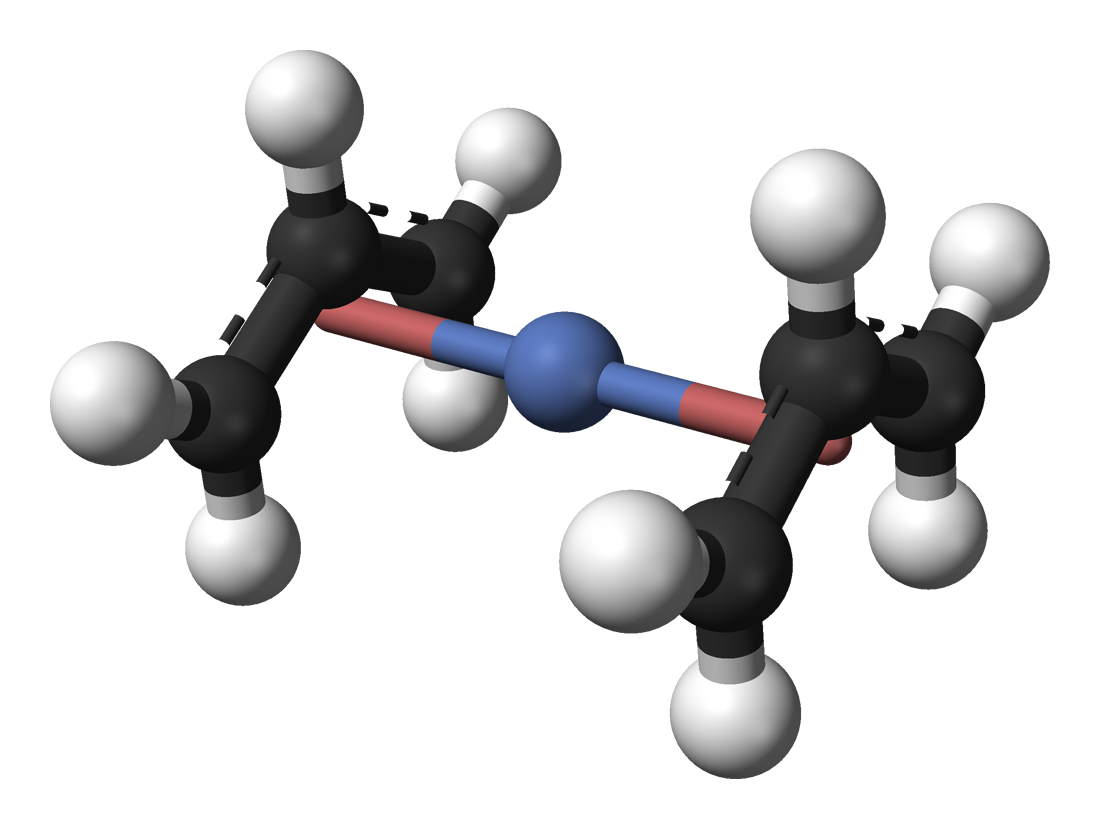

Names
- IUPAC name Bis(η^{3}‐allyl)nickel(II)
- Other names diallylnickel

Identifiers
CAS Number	12077-85-9
3D model (JSmol)	Interactive image
ChemSpider	17218878
PubChem CID	12494635
- InChI: InChI=1S/2C3H5.Ni/c2*1-3-2;/h2*3H,1-2H2;/q2*-1;+2 Key: CXZRBHUCODWFTL-UHFFFAOYSA-N
- SMILES: [CH2-]C=C.[CH2-]C=C.[Ni+2]

Properties
Chemical formula	C_{6}H_{10}Ni
Molar mass	140.839 g·mol^{−1}
Appearance	yellow liquid
Density	1.537 g/cm^{3}
Melting point	0 °C (32 °F; 273 K)
- Except where otherwise noted, data are given for materials in their standard state (at 25 °C [77 °F], 100 kPa). Infobox references

Bis(allyl)nickel is an organonickel compound with the formula Ni(η^{3}-C_{3}H_{5})_{2}. The molecule consists of two allyl ligands bound to nickel(II). It has inversion symmetry. It is a volatile yellow liquid at room temperature.

== Preparation and reactions ==
It can be prepared by the reaction of allyl magnesium bromide with anhydrous nickel chloride. It was first prepared similarly by Gunther Wilke et al. The same group reported that the complex react with carbon monoxide to give nickel tetracarbonyl and 1,5-hexadiene. It catalyzes the trimerization of butadiene. With tertiary phosphines, the complex gives the tetrakis derivative. Such reactions to proceed via the intermediacy of the 18-electron adduct.

Ni(C_{3}H_{5})_{2} + PR_{3} → Ni(C_{3}H_{5})_{2}(PR_{3})
Ni(C_{3}H_{5})_{2}PR_{3} → Ni(CH_{2}=CHCH_{2}CH_{2}CH=CH_{2})(PR_{3})
Ni(CH_{2}=CHCH_{2}CH_{2}CH=CH_{2})(PR_{3}) + 3 PR_{3} → Ni(PR_{3})_{4} + CH_{2}=CHCH_{2}CH_{2}CH=CH_{2}
