= Organonickel chemistry =

Branch of organometallic chemistry

organonickel

Organonickel chemistry is a branch of organometallic chemistry that deals with organic compounds featuring nickel-carbon bonds. They are used as a catalyst, as a building block in organic chemistry and in chemical vapor deposition. Organonickel compounds are also short-lived intermediates in organic reactions. The first organonickel compound was nickel tetracarbonyl Ni(CO)_{4}, reported in 1890 and quickly applied in the Mond process for nickel purification. Organonickel complexes are prominent in numerous industrial processes including carbonylations, hydrocyanation, and the Shell higher olefin process.

== Classes of compounds ==
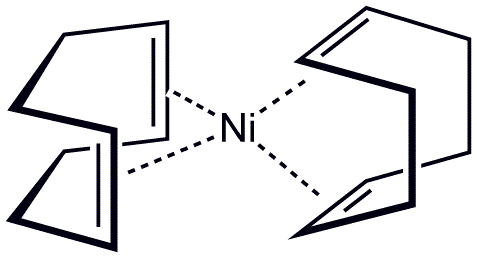
Bis(1,5-cyclooctadiene)nickel(0)

=== Alkyl and aryl complexes ===
A popular reagent is Ni(CH_{3})_{2}(tetramethylethylenediamine).

Many alkyl and aryl complexes are known with the formula NiR(X)L_{2}. Examples include [(dppf)Ni(cinnamyl)Cl)], trans-(PCy_{2}Ph)_{2}Ni(o-tolyl)Cl]], (dppf)Ni(o-tolyl)Cl]], (TMEDA)Ni(o-tolyl)Cl, and (TMEDA)NiMe_{2}, (TMEDA)Ni(Br)(C_{6}F_{5}).

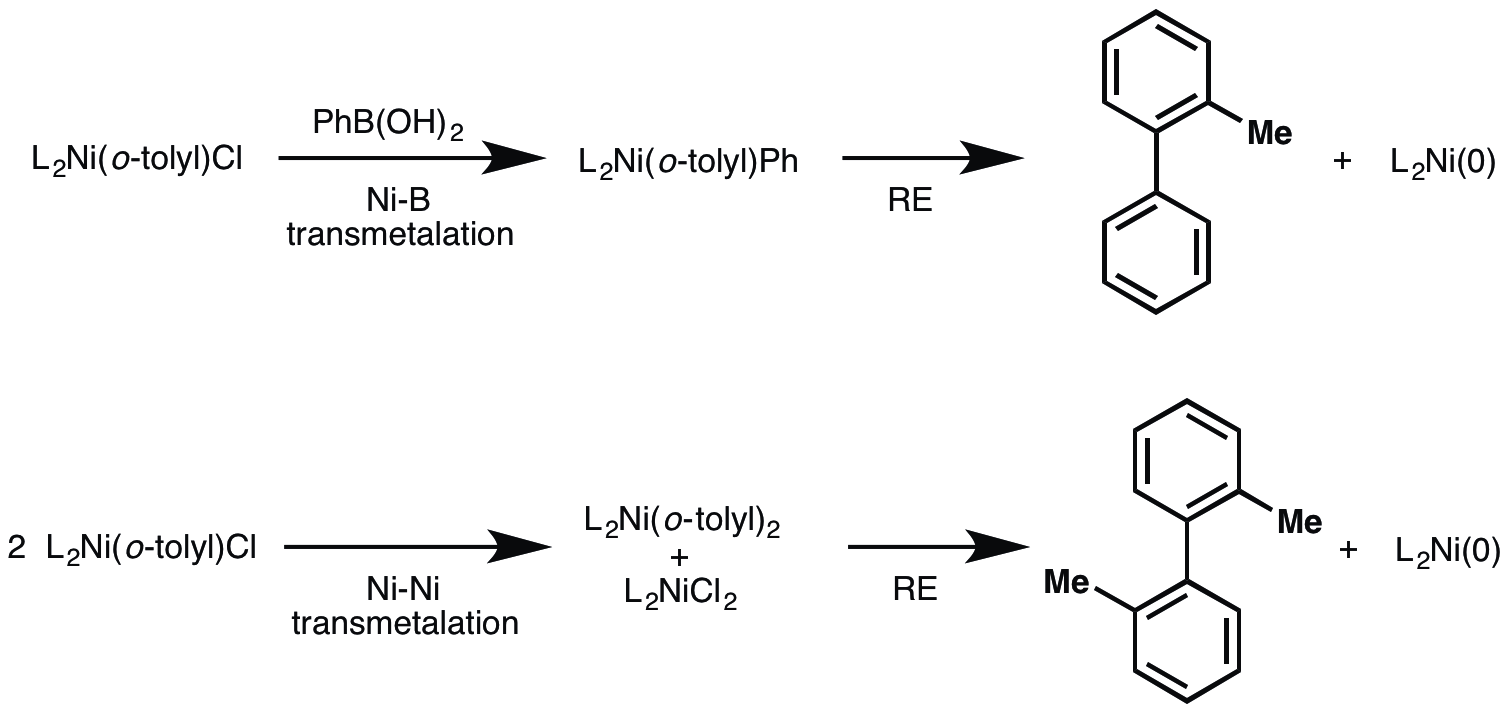
Synthesis of [(TMEDA)Ni(o-tolyl)Cl].

Nickel compounds of the type NiR_{2} also exist with just 12 valence electrons. In solution however solvent always interact with the metal atom increasing the electron count. One 12 VE compound is di(mesityl)nickel prepared from (allyl)_{2}Ni_{2}Br_{2} and the corresponding Grignard reagent.

(allyl)_{2}Ni_{2}Br_{2} + 4 C_{6}H_{2}Me_{3}MgBr → 2 (allyl)MgBr + 2 MgBr_{2} + 2 (C_{6}H_{2}Me_{3})_{2}Ni

=== Alkene complexes ===
Many complexes exist of nickel coordinated to an alkene. Practical applications of this theme include polymerization or oligomerization of alkenes, as in the Shell Higher Olefin Process. In these compounds nickel is formally zerovalent Ni^{0} and the bonding is described with the Dewar–Chatt–Duncanson model. One common representative is Bis(cyclooctadiene)nickel(0) (Ni(COD)_{2}), which contains two cyclooctadiene ligands. It is a 18VE compound with 10 electrons provided by nickel itself and 4x2 electrons more by the double bonds. This solid, which melts at 60 °C and decomposes upon exposure to air, is used as a catalyst and as a precursor for many other nickel compounds, such as the air-stable analog Ni(COD)(DQ).

=== Allyl complexes ===
Bis(allyl)nickel

Nickel forms several simple allyl complexes. Allyl halides react with Ni(CO)_{4} to form pi-allyl complexes, (allyl)_{2}Ni_{2}Cl_{2}. These compounds in turn are sources of allyl nucleophiles. In (allyl)_{2}Ni_{2}Br_{2} and (allyl)Ni(C_{5}H_{5}), nickel is assigned to oxidation number +2, and the electron counts are 16 and 18, respectively. Bis(allyl)nickel is prepared from allyl magnesium bromide and nickel chloride.

=== Cyclopentadienyl complexes ===
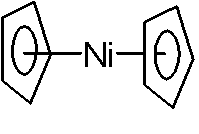
Nickelocene

Nickelocene NiCp_{2} with +2 Ni oxidation state and 20 valence electrons is the main metallocene of nickel. It can be oxidized by one electron. The corresponding palladocene and platinocene are unknown. From nickelocene, many derivatives are generated, e.g. CpNiLCl, CpNiNO, and Cp_{2}Ni_{2}(CO)_{3}.

=== Carbene complexes ===
Nickel forms carbene complexes, formally featuring C=Ni double bonds.

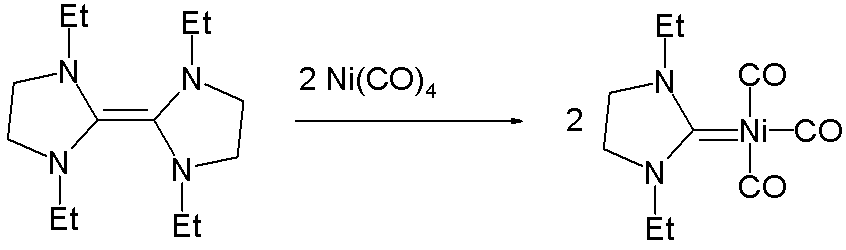

== Reactions ==
=== Alkene/alkyne oligomerizations ===
Nickel compounds catalyze the oligomerization of alkenes and alkynes. This property validated the research and development of Ziegler–Natta catalysts in the 1950s. That discovery shown by nickel impurities originating from an autoclave which killed the propagation reaction (Aufbau) in favor of termination reaction to a terminal alkene: the polymerization of ethylene suddenly stopped at 1-butene. This so-called nickel effect prompted the search for other catalysts capable of this reaction, with results in the finding of new catalysts that technically produced high molar mass polymers, like the modern Ziegler–Natta catalysts.

One practical implementation of alkyne oligomerization is the Reppe synthesis; for example in the synthesis of cyclooctatetraene:

This is a formal [2+2+2+2]cycloaddition. The oligomerization of butadiene with ethylene to trans-1,4-hexadiene was an industrial process at one time.

Formal [2+2+2]cycloadditions also take place in alkyne trimerisation. This extensible trimerisation can generally include benzyne. Benzyne is generated in situ from a benzene compound attached to a triflate and a trimethylsilyl substituent in the ortho- positions and reacts with a di-yne such as 1,7-octadiyne along with a nickel(II) bromide / zinc catalyst system (NiBr_{2} bis(diphenylphosphino) ethane / Zn) to synthesize the corresponding naphthalene derivative.

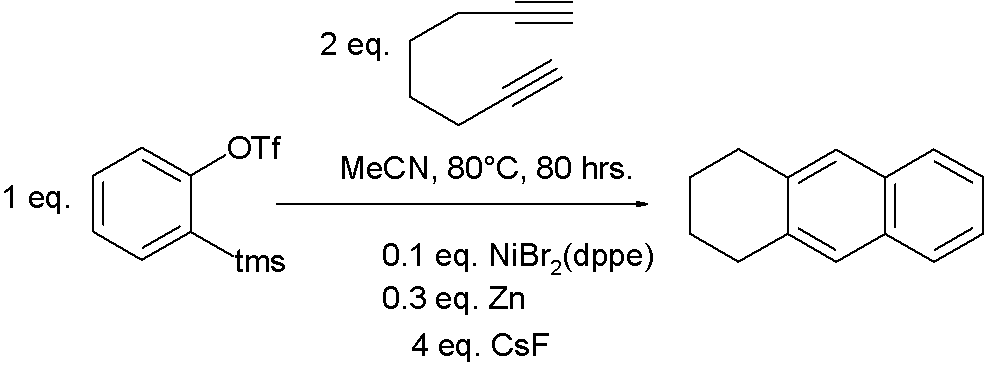

In the catalytic cycle elementary zinc serves to reduce nickel(II) to nickel(0) to which can then coordinate two alkyne bonds. A cyclometalation step follows to the nickelcyclopentadiene intermediate and then coordination of the benzyne which gives a C-H insertion reaction to the nickelcycloheptatriene compound. Reductive elimination liberates the tetrahydroanthracene compound.

The formation of organonickel compounds in this type of reaction is not always obvious but in a carefully designed experiment two such intermediates are formed quantitatively:

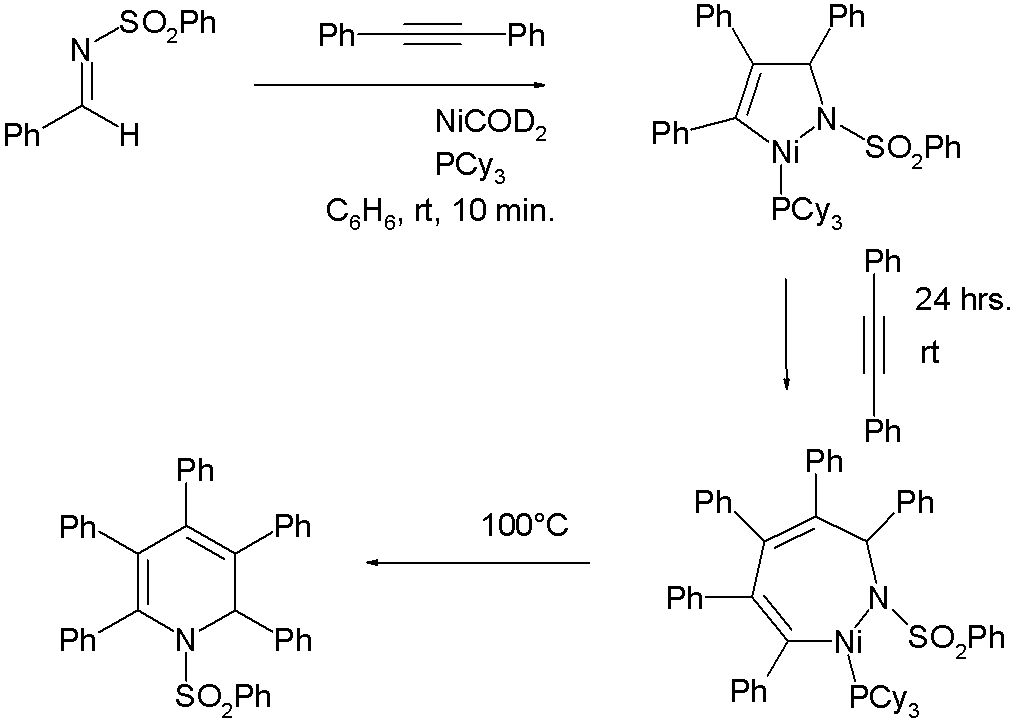

It is noted in one study that this reaction only works with acetylene itself or with simple alkynes due to poor regioselectivity. From a terminal alkyne 7 isomers are possibly differing in the position of the substituents or the double bond positions. One strategy to remedy this problem employs certain diynes:

The selected reaction conditions also minimize the amount formed of competing [2+2+2]cycloaddition product to the corresponding substituted arene.

=== Coupling reactions ===
Nickel compounds cause the coupling reaction between allyl and aryl halides. Other coupling reactions involving nickel in catalytic amounts are the Kumada coupling and the Negishi coupling.

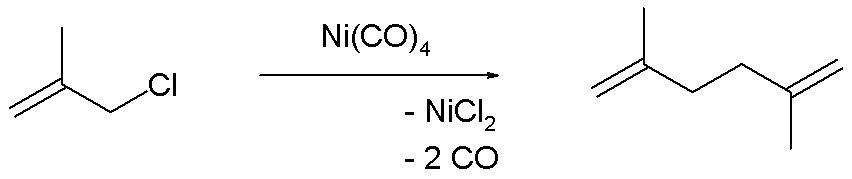

=== Ni carbonylation ===
Ni catalyzes the addition of carbon monoxide to alkenes and alkynes. The industrial production of acrylic acid at one time consisted of combining acetylene, carbon monoxide and water at 40-55 atm and 160-200 °C with nickel(II) bromide and a copper halide.

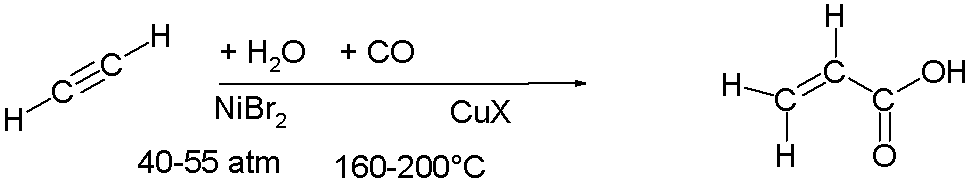

== See also ==
- Nickel(IV) organometallic complex
- Nickel(II) precatalysts
- Lactate racemase
