= Platinum diphosphide =

Identifiers
CAS Number	12165-68-3
3D model (JSmol)	Interactive image
- InChI: InChI=1S/2P.Pt Key: KOMIUMNDFGSLAN-UHFFFAOYSA-N
- SMILES: [Pt]1P=P1

Properties
Chemical formula	P_{2}Pt
Molar mass	257.032 g·mol^{−1}
Appearance	silvery-white crystals
Melting point	1,500 °C (2,730 °F; 1,770 K)
Solubility in water	insoluble

Related compounds
Related compounds	Osmium diphosphide
- Except where otherwise noted, data are given for materials in their standard state (at 25 °C [77 °F], 100 kPa). Infobox references

Platinum diphosphide is a binary inorganic compound of platinum metal and phosphorus with the chemical formula PtP_{2}.

== Synthesis ==
Platinum diphosphide can be prepared by passing phosphorus vapors over spongy platinum or prolonged heating of platinum and phosphorus in a vacuum ampoule at 570 °C:

2 Pt + P_{4} → 2 PtP_{2}

Also, by reducing platinum(II) acetylacetonate to platinum nanoparticles and reacting with trioctylphosphine at 370 °C.

== Properties ==
Platinum diphosphide forms silvery-white crystals of cubic crystal system with the space group Pa3.

== Uses ==
Platinum diphosphide can be used as a semiconductor and catalyst.
