= Nickel pincer mononucleotide =

Names
- Other names nickel-pincer nucleotide, NPMN, NPN
- Except where otherwise noted, data are given for materials in their standard state (at 25 °C [77 °F], 100 kPa). Infobox references

Nickel pincer mononucleotide (NPMN) or nickel pincer nucleotide (NPN) is a mononucleotide prosthetic group present in certain nickel metalloproteins. It contains a nickel-carbon bond.

It was first identified in lactate racemase (LarA) from Lactobacillus plantarum. It is able to catalyze the transfer of a hydride.

== Structure ==
NPMN is a pincer complex, which binds nickel ion by two sulfur atoms and one carbon atom of the pyridinium center in a tridentate manner.

In enzymes, NPMN is bound by a lysine residue to a protein through one of the thioesters. The fourth ligand for nickel is usually a histidine residue.

== Biosynthesis ==
NPMN is a coenzyme similar to NAD^{+} and is synthesized from nicotinic acid adenine dinucleotide (NaAD), the deamidated form of NAD^{+}. Its biosynthesis was described in Lactiplantibacillus plantarum. In this process, the pyridinium ring of NaAD is first carboxylated by the enzyme LarB to create dinicotinic acid adenine dinucleotide (DaAD), which is then hydrolyzed to form pyridinium-3,5-biscarboxylic acid mononucleotide (P2CMN) and AMP. Using ATP as energy source, sulfide is then inserted into P2CMN twice by enzyme LarE, forming two thioester groups, which results in pyridinium-3,5-bisthiocarboxylic acid mononucleotide (P2TMN). In the last step of the biosynthesis, the enzyme LarC, which is CTP-dependent, inserts nickel ion in-between the two thioester groups and the pyridinium ring.

Biosynthesis of nickel pincer mononucleotide

=== LarE ===
Interestingly, LarE from L. plantarum, classified as a sincle-Cys version of LarE, transfers sulfide from a cysteine (Cys) residue in its own sequence rather than from a free Cys or an inorganic source. In the process, the Cys is turned into a dehydroalanine (Dha) residue and it is speculated, that a salvaging mechanism exists to turn it back into Cys. A persulfide version of coenzyme A has been shown to revert this Dha into a Cys, but it is unknown whether such reactivity exists in vivo.

The so-called tri-Cys versions of LarE can be found in Thermotoga maritima and Methanococcus maripaludis. These enzymes utilize a labile [4Fe-4S] cluster instead, which is bound by three Cys residues. Using E. coli cysteine desulfurase, researchers were able to turn this cluster into [4Fe-5S] cluster, which was then able to catalyze change from P2CMN to P2TMN.

== Reactivity ==
NPMN is present as a prosthetic group in several nickel-dependent enzymes, most notably lactate racemase (LarA), in which it was discovered. However, various NPMN-containing enzymes are able to oxidize sugars or act as epimerases.

Thanks to a bioinformatic analysis, homologs in about 100 genomes of the enzyme LarA have been discovered, suggesting a wide distribution of this coenzyme.

Recently, thanks to a bioinformatic pipeline, new NPMN-dependent hydride transferases have been discovered.
