= Nickelocene =

Nickelocene
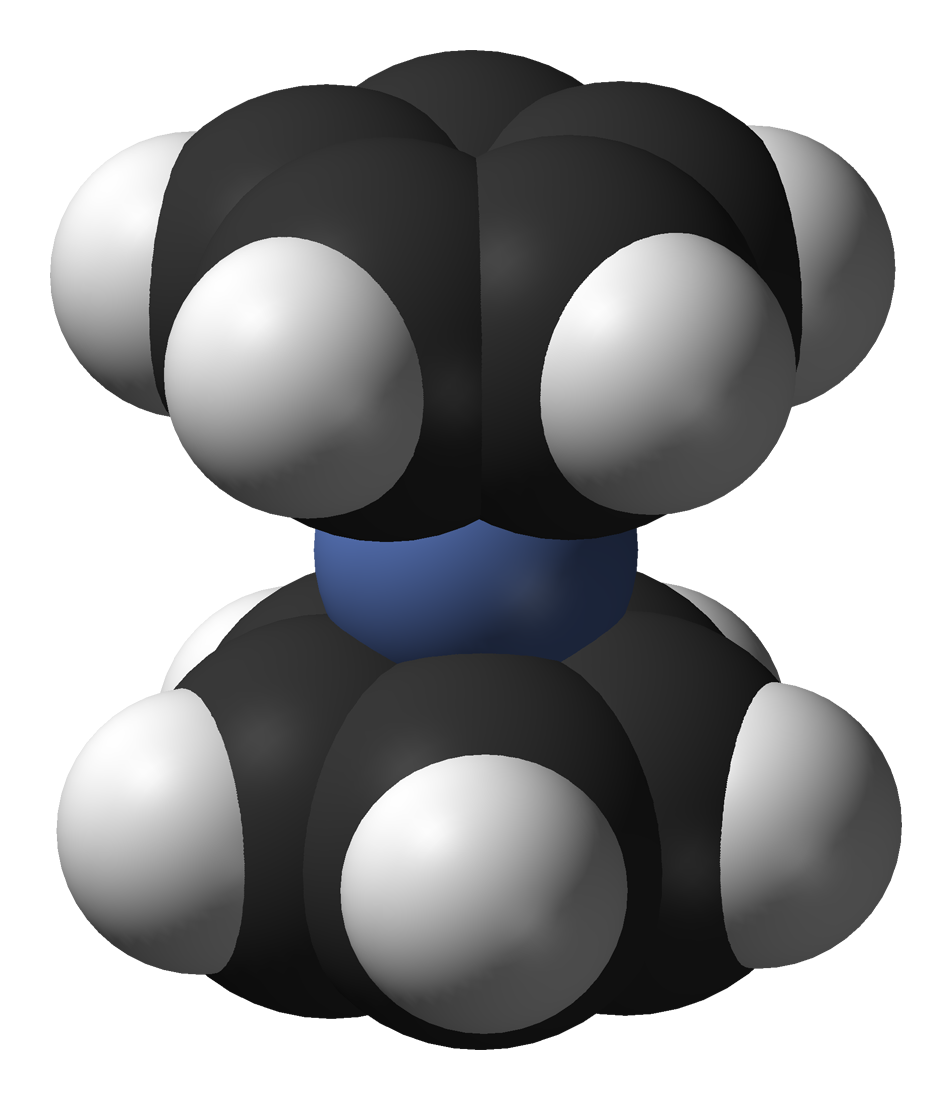
Space-filling model of nickelocene
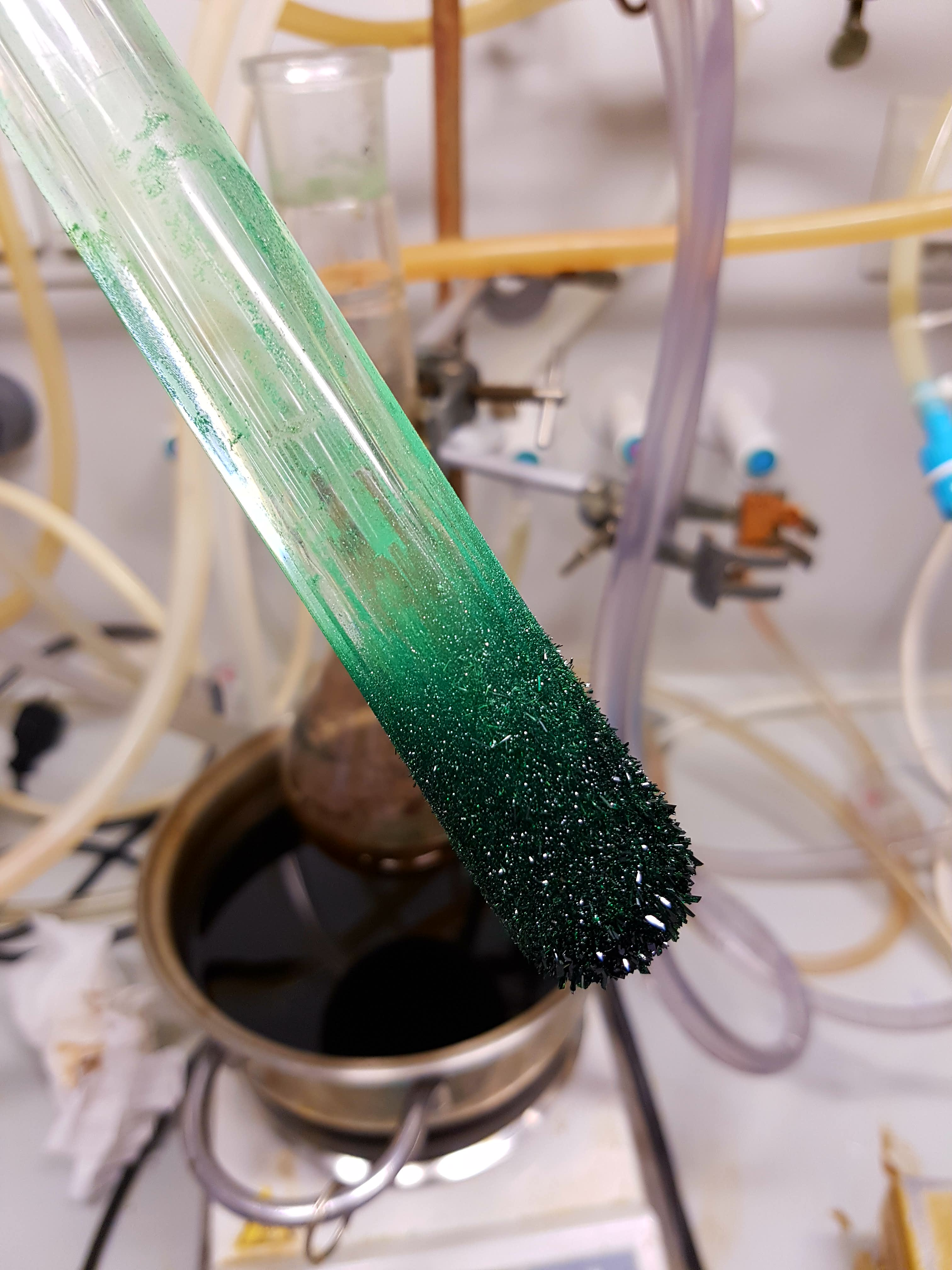
- Nickelocene freshly depositied on a cold finger

Names
- Preferred IUPAC name Nickelocene
- Other names Bis(cyclopentadienyl) nickel(II)

Identifiers
CAS Number	1271-28-9
3D model (JSmol)	Interactive image
ChEBI	CHEBI:30679
ChemSpider	56178
ECHA InfoCard	100.013.672
EC Number	215-039-0
Gmelin Reference	3412
PubChem CID	13628993
RTECS number	QR6500000
UNII	JR8F745XV5
UN number	1325 3082
CompTox Dashboard (EPA)	DTXSID8025709
- InChI: InChI=1S/2C5H5.Ni/c2*1-2-4-5-3-1;/h2*1-5H;/q2*-1;+2 Key: KZPXREABEBSAQM-UHFFFAOYSA-N
- SMILES: C1=C[CH-](C=C1).[Ni+2].[CH-](C=C2)C=C2

Properties
Chemical formula	C_{10}H_{10}Ni
Molar mass	188.88 g/mol
Appearance	Green crystals
Density	1.47 g/cm^{3}
Melting point	171 to 173 °C (340 to 343 °F; 444 to 446 K)
Solubility in water	insoluble

Structure
Coordination geometry	D_{5h}, D_{5d}
Dipole moment	0 D

Hazards
- GHS labelling
Pictograms	(GHS02: Flammable) (GHS07: Exclamation mark) (GHS08: Health hazard)
Signal word	Danger
Hazard statements	H228, H302, H317, H350
Precautionary statements	P201, P202, P210, P240, P241, P261, P264, P270, P272, P280, P281, P301+P312, P302+P352, P308+P313, P321, P330, P333+P313, P363, P370+P378, P405, P501
NFPA 704 (fire diamond)	2 4 2
- Lethal dose or concentration (LD, LC)
LD_{50} (median dose)	490 mg kg^{−1} (oral, rat); 600 mg kg^{−1} (oral, mouse)

Related compounds
Related compounds	CoCp_{2}, FeCp_{2}
- Except where otherwise noted, data are given for materials in their standard state (at 25 °C [77 °F], 100 kPa). verify (what is ?) Infobox references

Nickelocene is the organonickel compound with the formula Ni(η^{5}-C_{5}H_{5})_{2}. Also known as bis(cyclopentadienyl)nickel or NiCp_{2}, this bright green paramagnetic solid is of enduring academic interest, although it does not yet have any known practical applications.

== Structure ==
Ni(C_{5}H_{5})_{2} belongs to a group of organometallic compounds called metallocenes. Metallocenes usually adopt structures in which a metal ion is sandwiched between two parallel cyclopentadienyl (Cp) rings. In the solid-state, the molecule has D_{5d} symmetry, wherein the two rings are staggered.

The Ni center has a formal +2 charge, and the Cp rings are usually assigned as cyclopentadienyl anions (Cp^{−}), related to cyclopentadiene by deprotonation. The structure is similar to ferrocene. In terms of its electronic structure, three pairs of d electrons on nickel are allocated to the three d orbitals involved in Ni–Cp bonding: d_{xy}, d_{x^{2}–y^{2}}, d_{z^{2}}. The two remaining d-electrons each reside in the d_{yz} and d_{xz} orbitals, giving rise to the molecule's paramagnetism, as manifested in the unusually high field chemical shift observed in its ^{1}H NMR spectrum. With 20 valence electrons, nickelocene has the highest electron count of the transition metal metallocenes. Cobaltocene, Co(C_{5}H_{5})_{2}, with only 19 valence electrons is, however, a stronger reducing agent, illustrating the fact that electron energy, not electron count determines redox potential.

== Preparation ==
Nickelocene was first prepared by E. O. Fischer in 1953, shortly after the discovery of ferrocene, the first metallocene compound to be discovered. It has been prepared in a one-pot reaction, by deprotonating cyclopentadiene with ethylmagnesium bromide, and adding anhydrous nickel(II) acetylacetonate. A modern synthesis entails treatment of anhydrous sources of NiCl_{2} (such as hexaamminenickel chloride) with sodium cyclopentadienyl:

[Ni(NH_{3})_{6}]Cl_{2} + 2 NaC_{5}H_{5} → Ni(C_{5}H_{5})_{2} + 2 NaCl + 6 NH_{3}

== Properties ==
Like many organometallic compounds, Ni(C_{5}H_{5})_{2} does not tolerate extended exposure to air before noticeable decomposition. Samples are typically handled with air-free techniques.

Most chemical reactions of nickelocene are characterized by its tendency to yield 18-electron products with loss or modification of one Cp ring.

Ni(C_{5}H_{5})_{2} + 4 PF_{3} → Ni(PF_{3})_{4} + organic products

The reaction with secondary phosphines follows a similar pattern:

2 Ni(C_{5}H_{5})_{2} + 2 PPh_{2}H → [Ni_{2}(PPh_{2})_{2}(C_{5}H_{5})_{2}] + 2 C_{5}H_{6}

Nickelocene can be oxidized to the corresponding cation, which contains Ni(III).

Gaseous Ni(C_{5}H_{5})_{2} decomposes to a nickel mirror upon contact with a hot surface, releasing the hydrocarbon ligands as gaseous coproducts. This process has been considered as a means of preparing nickel films.

Nickelocene reacts with nitric acid to produce cyclopentadienyl nickel nitrosyl, a highly toxic organonickel compound.
