= Cyclopentadienyl nickel nitrosyl =

Names
- IUPAC name azanylidyneoxidanium;cyclopenta-1,3-diene;nickel
- Other names Cyclopentadienylnickelnitrosyl (6CI); Nickel, nitrosylcyclopentadienyl- (7CI); Nickel, p-cyclopentadienylnitrosyl- (8CI); (Cyclopentadienyl)nitrosylnickel;; (h5-Cyclopentadienyl)(nitrosyl)nickel; Cyclopentadienylnitrosylnickel(II); p-Cyclopentadienylnitrosylnickel

Identifiers
CAS Number	12071-73-7
3D model (JSmol)	Interactive image
ChemSpider	65322142
PubChem CID	42621475
- InChI: InChI=1S/C5H5.NO.Ni/c1-2-4-5-3-1;1-2;/h1-5H;;/q-1;+1; Key: RUGUYOINVVZVCI-UHFFFAOYSA-N
- SMILES: [CH-]1C=CC=C1.[Ni+]([N+]#[O-])

Properties
Chemical formula	(C_{5}H_{5})NiNO
Molar mass	153.7927 g/mol
Appearance	Blood-red liquid
Odor	Unpleasant, disagreeable
Melting point	−41 °C (−42 °F; 232 K)
Boiling point	144–145 °C (291–293 °F; 417–418 K)
Solubility in water	Insoluble
Solubility	Very soluble in all organic compounds

Hazards
- Occupational safety and health (OHS/OSH)
Main hazards	Extremely Toxic (T+)
- GHS labelling
Pictograms	(GHS06: Toxic) (GHS08: Health hazard) (GHS09: Environmental hazard)
NFPA 704 (fire diamond)	4 0 1
- Except where otherwise noted, data are given for materials in their standard state (at 25 °C [77 °F], 100 kPa). Infobox references

Cyclopentadienyl nickel nitrosyl is an organonickel compound with the formula (C_{5}H_{5})NiNO. It is a diamagnetic, volatile, relatively air-stable red liquid. It has been reported to be the simplest mono-cyclopentadienyl metal complex. It is prepared by treating nickelocene with nitric oxide. The complex has C_{5v} symmetry.

The compound reacts with lithium aluminium hydride to give the paramagnetic cluster (C_{5}H_{5})_{4}Ni_{4}H_{3}.

The related pentamethylcyclopentadienyl complex (C_{5}(CH_{3})_{5})NiNO is also known.

Cyclopentadienyl nickel nitrosyl was the subject of several patents as a fuel additive.

== Safety ==
Its toxicity is said to be comparable to nickel tetracarbonyl.

== See also ==
- Cyclopentadienyl
- Cyclopentadienyl complex
- Cyclopentadiene
