= Osmium diphosphide =

Identifiers
CAS Number	12037-59-1
3D model (JSmol)	Interactive image
- InChI: InChI=1S/Os.2P Key: ABSLRQKWGOLSHR-UHFFFAOYSA-N
- SMILES: [Os].[P].[P]

Properties
Chemical formula	OsP_{2}
Molar mass	252.18 g·mol^{−1}
Appearance	black crystals
Density	9.33 g/cm^{3}
Solubility in water	insoluble

Related compounds
Related compounds	Platinum diphosphide
- Except where otherwise noted, data are given for materials in their standard state (at 25 °C [77 °F], 100 kPa). Infobox references

Osmium diphosphide is a binary inorganic compound of osmium metal and phosphorus with the chemical formula OsP_{2}.

== Synthesis ==
Osmium diphosphide can be obtained by fusion of stoichiometric amounts of osmium and red phosphorus at 500-1000 °C:

2 Os + P_{4} → 2 OsP_{2}

== Properties ==
Osmium diphosphide forms black crystals of orthorhombic crystal system with space group Pnnm.

== Uses ==
Osmium diphosphide can be used as a semiconductor.
