= Tetramethylethylenediamine(dimethyl)nickel(II) =

Identifiers
| CAS Number | 122905-76-4 |
| 3D model (JSmol) | Interactive image |
| PubChem CID | 59048650 |
- InChI: InChI=1S/C6H16N2.2CH3.Ni/c1-7(2)5-6-8(3)4;;;/h5-6H2,1-4H3;2*1H3;/q;2*-1; Key: YAZPWQVRDILILI-UHFFFAOYSA-N
- SMILES: [CH3-].[CH3-].CN(C)CCN(C)C.[Ni]

Properties
| Chemical formula | C_{8}H_{22}N_{2}Ni |
| Molar mass | 204.971 g·mol^{−1} |
| Appearance | yellow-brown solid |
- Except where otherwise noted, data are given for materials in their standard state (at 25 °C [77 °F], 100 kPa). Infobox references

Tetramethylethylenediamine(dimethyl)nickel(II) is the organonickel complex with the formula (Me_{2}NCH_{2}CH_{2}NMe_{2})NiMe_{2} (Me = CH_{3}). This yellow-brown, air-sensitive compound is popular precursor to diverse organonickel complexes. It is prepared from the tmeda adduct of nickel(II) acetylacetonate by reaction with methyl lithium.

The tmeda ligand is easily displaced by bases such as bipyridine and diphosphines. Treatment of the complex with electrophilic alkenes results in elimination of ethylene, giving alkene complexes.
