= Cyclopentadienyl allyl palladium =

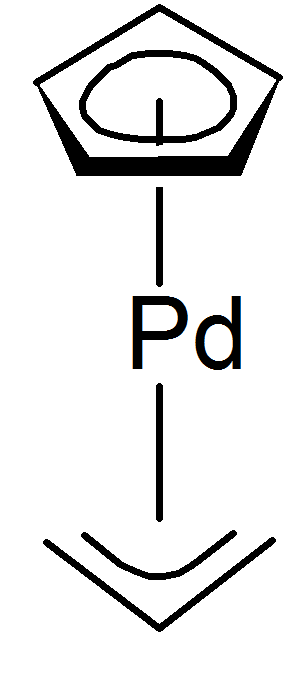

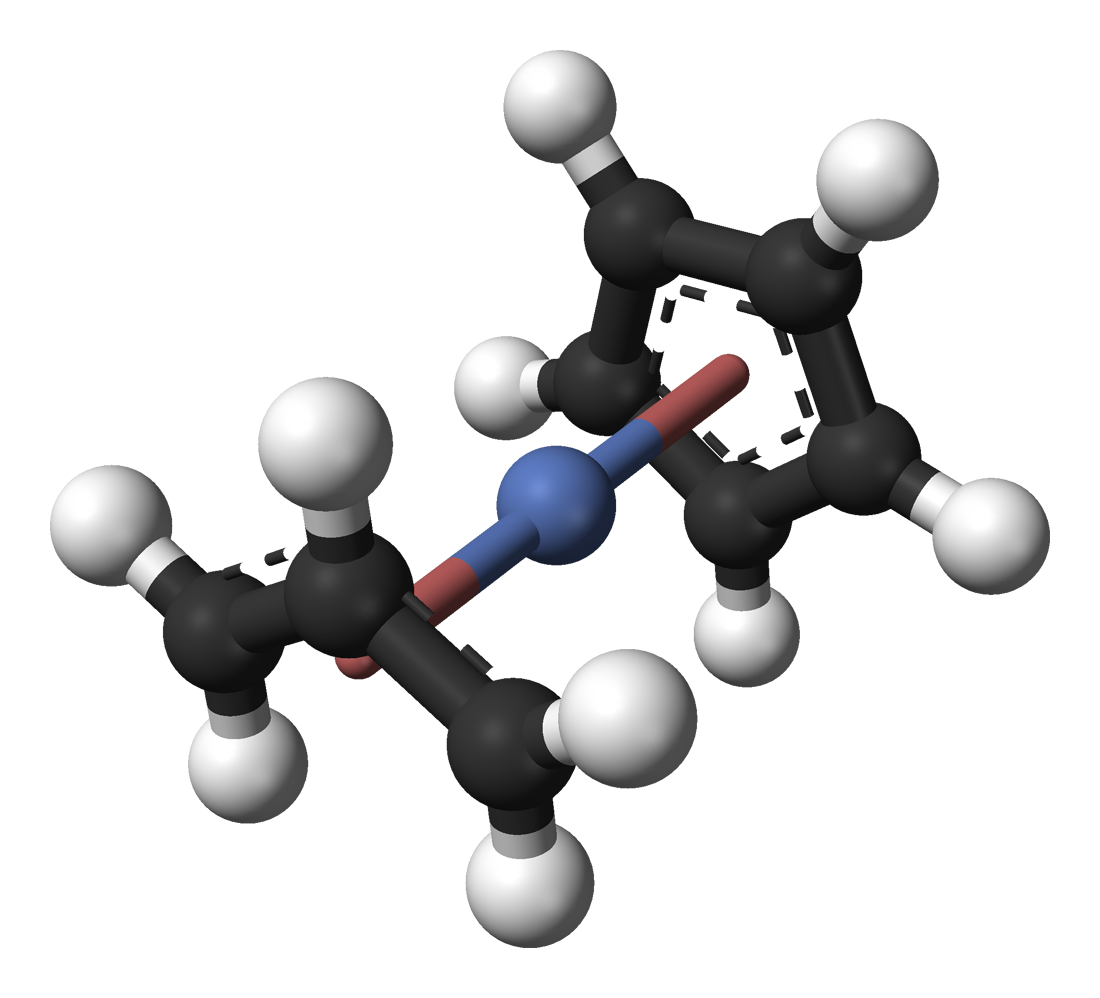

Names
- Other names (Cp)Pd(allyl)

Identifiers
CAS Number	1271-03-0
3D model (JSmol)	Interactive image
ChemSpider	129920832
PubChem CID	15242693
- InChI: InChI=1S/C5H5.C3H5.Pd/c1-2-4-5-3-1;1-3-2;/h1-5H;3H,1-2H2;/q2*-1;+2 Key: GMKVOFVVZAXJKV-UHFFFAOYSA-N
- SMILES: [CH2-]C=C.[CH-]1C=CC=C1.[Pd+2]

Properties
Chemical formula	C_{8}H_{10}Pd
Molar mass	212.59 g·mol^{−1}
Appearance	Reddish needle-shaped solid
Melting point	60 to 62 °C (140 to 144 °F; 333 to 335 K)
- Except where otherwise noted, data are given for materials in their standard state (at 25 °C [77 °F], 100 kPa). verify (what is ?) Infobox references

Cyclopentadienyl allyl palladium is an organopalladium compound with formula (C_{5}H_{5})Pd(C_{3}H_{5}). This reddish solid is volatile with an unpleasant odor. It is soluble in common organic solvents. The molecule consists of a Pd centre sandwiched between a Cp and allyl ligands.

== Preparation ==
This complex is produced by the reaction of allylpalladium chloride dimer with sodium cyclopentadienide:

2 C_{5}H_{5}Na + (C_{3}H_{5})_{2}Pd_{2}Cl_{2} → 2 (C_{5}H_{4})Pd(C_{3}H_{5}) + 2 NaCl

== Structure and reactions ==
The 18-electron complex adopts a half-sandwich structure with C_{s} symmetry, i.e., the molecule has a plane of symmetry. The complex can be decomposed readily by reductive elimination.

C_{3}H_{5}PdC_{3}H_{5} → Pd(0) + C_{5}H_{5}C_{3}H_{5}

The compound readily reacts with alkyl isocyanides to produce clusters with the approximate formula [Pd(CNR)_{2}]_{n}. It reacts with bulky alkyl phosphines to produce two-coordinated palladium(0) complexes:

CpPd(allyl) + 2 PR_{3} → Pd(PR_{3})_{2} + C_{5}H_{5}C_{3}H_{5}

The compound has been used to deposit thin film chemical vapor deposition of metallic palladium.
