= Lactate racemase =

Identifiers
- EC no.: 5.1.2.1
- CAS no.: 2602118

Databases
- BRENDA: enzyme data
- ExPASy: NiceZyme view
- KEGG: enzyme entry
- MetaCyc: metabolic pathway
- Rhea: reactions
- PDB structures: RCSB PDB PDBe PDBsum
Search
- PMC: articles
- PubMed: articles
- NCBI: proteins

The lactate racemase enzyme (Lar) (EC 5.1.2.1) interconverts the D- and L-enantiomers of lactic acid. It is classified under the isomerase, racemase, epimerase, and enzyme acting on hydroxyl acids and derivatives classes of enzymes. It is found in certain halophilic archaea, such as Haloarcula marismortui, and in a few species of bacteria, such as several Lactobacillus species (which produce D- and L-lactate) including Lactobacillus sakei, Lactobacillus curvatus, and Lactobacillus plantarum, as well as in non-lactic acid bacteria such as Clostridium beijerinckii. The gene encoding lactate racemase in L. plantarum was identified as larA and shown to be associated with a widespread maturation system involving larB, larC1, larC2, and larE. The optimal pH for its activity is 5.8-6.2 in L. sakei.

== Structure and properties ==
The molecular weight of lactate racemase differs in the various organisms in which it has been found, ranging from 25,000 to 82,400 g/mol. The structure of the enzyme from L. plantarum was solved by Jian Hu and Robert P. Hausinger of Michigan State University and co-workers there and elsewhere. The protein contains a previously unknown covalently-linked nickel-pincer nucleotide (NPN) cofactor (pyridinium 3-thioamide-5-thiocarboxylic acid mononucleotide), where the nickel atom is bound to C4 of the pyridinium ring and two sulfur atoms. This cofactor participates in a proton-coupled hydride-transfer mechanism.

There have been a number of recent studies on NPN cofactor synthesis by the LarB, LarE, and LarC proteins. LarB is a carboxylase/hydrolase of nicotinamide adenine dinucleotide (NAD), providing pyridinium-3,5-dicarboxylic acid mononucleotide and adenosine monophosphate (AMP). LarE is an ATP-dependent sulfur transferase that converts the two substrate carboxyl groups into thioacids by sacrificing the sulfur atoms of a cysteine residue in the protein. Finally, LarC inserts nickel into the organic ligand by a CTP-dependent process to complete synthesis of the NPN cofactor.

== Enzyme activity ==
In many of the species containing lactate racemase, the physiological role of the enzyme is to convert substrate D-lactate into L-lactate. In other species, such as L. plantarum, the cellular role is to transform L-lactate into D-lactate for incorporation into the cell wall.

The in vitro reaction catalyzed by the enzyme reaches equilibrium at the point where approximately equimolar concentrations of the D- and L-isomers exist.

L. plantarum initially produces L-lactate, which induces the activity of lactate racemase. By contrast, D-lactate represses lactate racemase activity in this species. Therefore, Lar activity appears to be regulated by the ratio of L-lactate/D-lactate. L. plantarum LarA represents a new type of nickel-dependent enzyme, due to its novel nickel-pincer ligand ligand cofactor.

== Importance ==
Two pathways appear to exist in L. plantarum for transforming pyruvate into D-lactate. One of them involves the NAD-dependent lactate dehydrogenase that directly produces D-lactate (LdhD), and the other is through the sequential activities of an L-specific lactate dehydrogenase followed by lactate racemase. If the LdhD enzyme is inactivated or inhibited, lactate racemase provides the bacterium with a rescue pathway for the production of D-lactate. This pathway is significant because the production of D-lactate in L. plantarum is linked to the biosynthesis of the cell wall. Mutants lacking LdhD activity that also had the lar operon deleted only produced L-lactate, and peptidoglycan biosynthesis was not able to occur.
