= Palladium(II) bis(acetylacetonate) =

Names
- IUPAC name Bis(acetylacetonato)palladium(II)
- Systematic IUPAC name Bis[(Z)-4-oxopent-2-en-2-olato-κ^{2}O,O′]palladium(II)

Identifiers
CAS Number	14024-61-4
3D model (JSmol)	coordination form: Interactive image; ionic form: Interactive image
ChemSpider	4589057
ECHA InfoCard	100.034.404
EC Number	237-859-8
PubChem CID	3035388
UNII	6G7QUC3M5J
CompTox Dashboard (EPA)	DTXSID50897725
- InChI: InChI=1S/2C5H8O2.Pd/c2*1-4(6)3-5(2)7;/h2*3,6H,1-2H3;/q;;+2/p-2 Key: JKDRQYIYVJVOPF-UHFFFAOYSA-L
- SMILES: coordination form: CC(=C[C-](C)O1)O[Pd+2]12OC(=C[C-](C)O2)C; ionic form: O=C(C)/C=C(C)\[O-].O=C(C)/C=C(C)\[O-].[Pd+2]

Properties
Chemical formula	C_{10}H_{14}O_{4}Pd
Molar mass	304.64 g·mol^{−1}
Appearance	yellow solid
Density	1.79 g/cm^{3}
Melting point	200 to 251 °C (392 to 484 °F; 473 to 524 K) (decomposes)

Structure
Crystal structure	monoclinic
Space group	P2_{1}/n, No. 14
Lattice constant	a = 9.9119 Å, b = 5.2232 Å, c = 10.3877 Å α = 90°, β = 95.807°, γ = 90°
Lattice volume (V)	535.04 Å^{3}
Formula units (Z)	2

Hazards
- GHS labelling
Pictograms	(GHS07: Exclamation mark)
Signal word	Warning
Hazard statements	H319
Precautionary statements	P210, P240, P241, P261, P264, P271, P280, P302+P352, P304+P340, P305+P351+P338, P312, P321, P332+P313, P337+P313, P362, P370+P378, P403+P233, P405, P501
- Except where otherwise noted, data are given for materials in their standard state (at 25 °C [77 °F], 100 kPa). verify (what is ?) Infobox references

Palladium(II) bis(acetylacetonate) is a compound with formula Pd(C_{5}H_{7}O_{2})_{2}. This yellow solid is the most common palladium complex of acetylacetonate. This compound is commercially available and used as a catalyst precursor in organic synthesis. The molecule is relatively planar with idealized D_{2h} symmetry.

== See also ==
- Platinum(II) bis(acetylacetonate)
- Nickel(II) bis(acetylacetonate)
