= Nickel(II) bis(acetylacetonate) =

Coordination complex

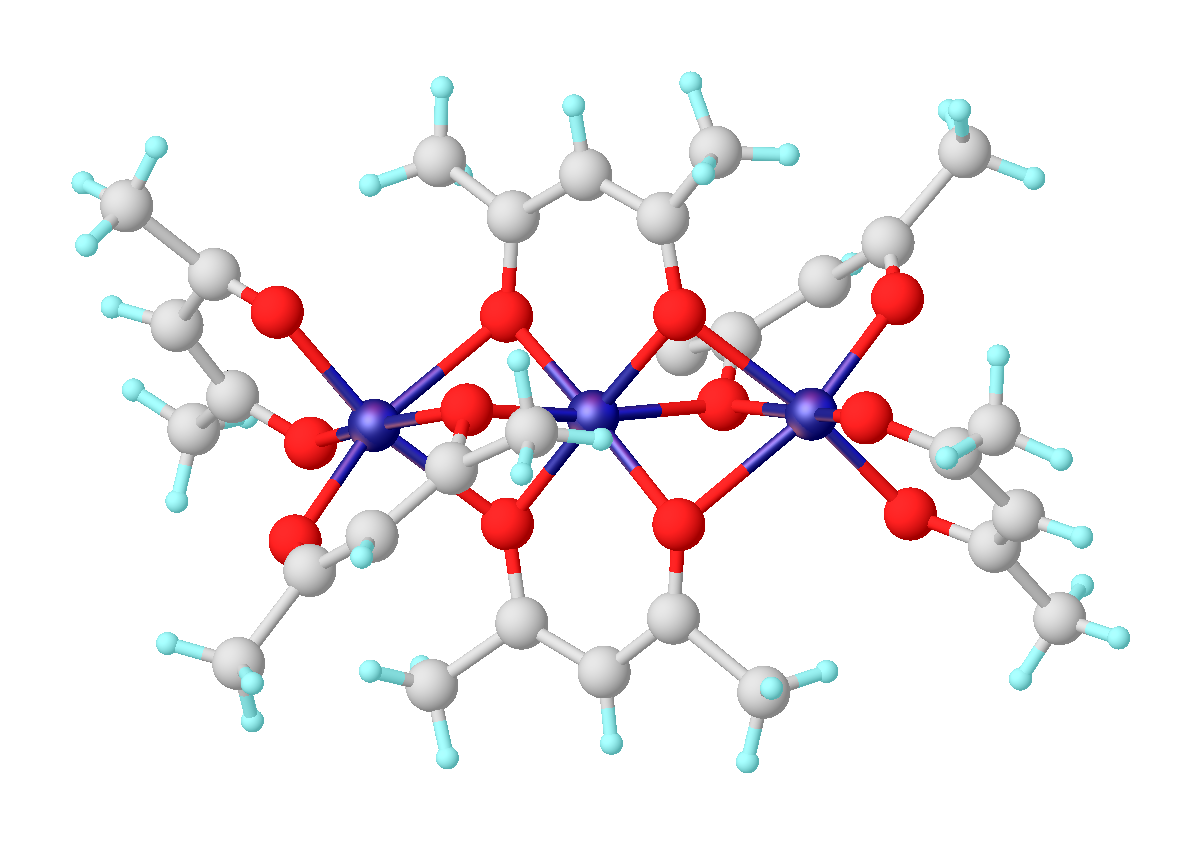

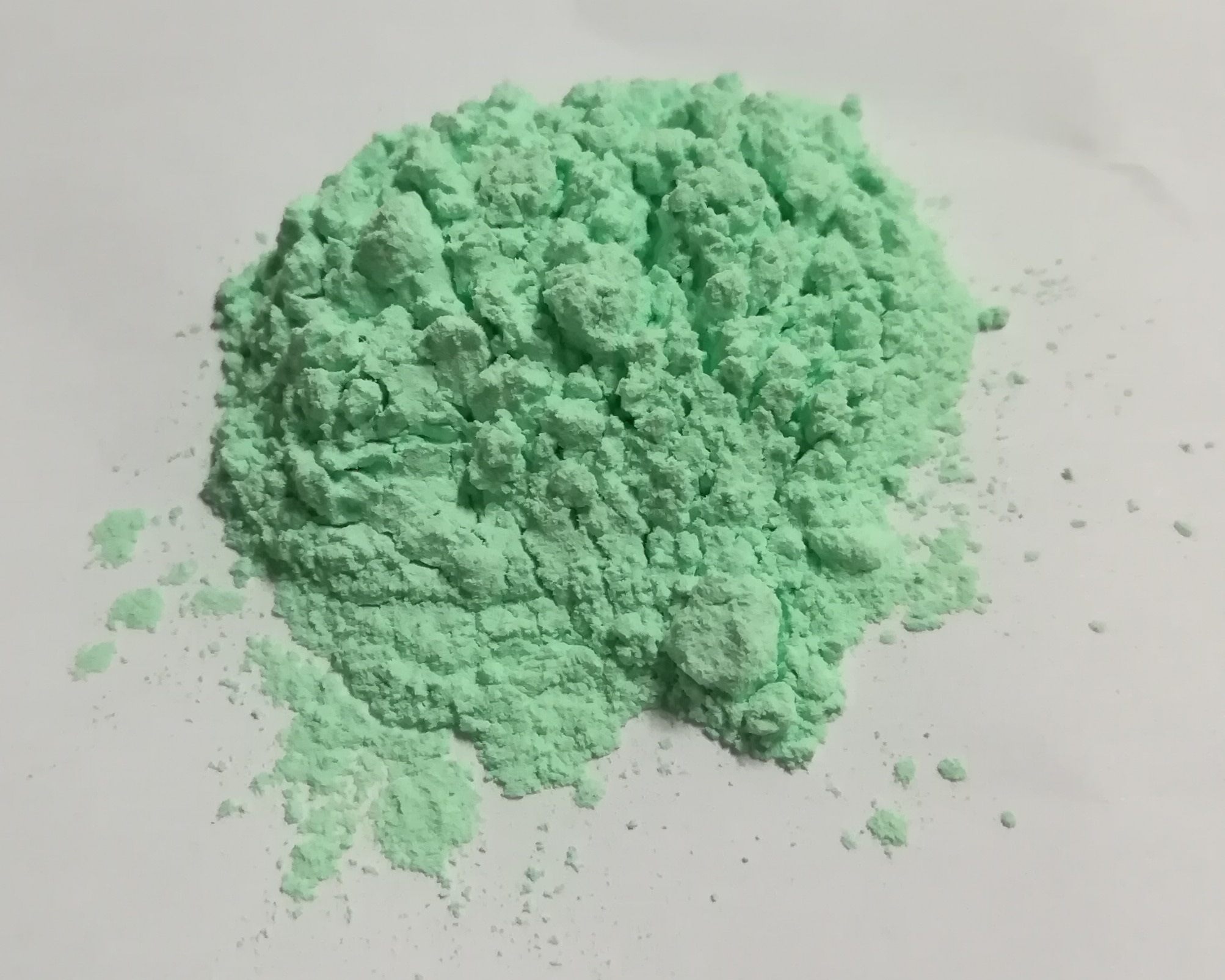

Names
- IUPAC name Bis(acetylacetonato)nickel(II)
- Systematic IUPAC name Bis[(Z)-4-oxopent-2-en-2-olato-κ^{2}O,O′]nickel(II)
- Other names Ni(acac)_{2}, nickel acac

Identifiers
CAS Number	3264-82-2
3D model (JSmol)	Interactive image
ChemSpider	2005906
ECHA InfoCard	100.019.887
EC Number	221-875-7
PubChem CID	5359853
UNII	5I48R807JO
CompTox Dashboard (EPA)	DTXSID80904370
- InChI: InChI=1S/2C5H8O2.Ni/c2*1-4(6)3-5(2)7;/h2*3,6H,1-2H3;/b2*4-3-; Key: SHWZFQPXYGHRKT-FDGPNNRMSA-N
- SMILES: C/C(=C/C(=O)C)/O.C/C(=C/C(=O)C)/O.[Ni]

Properties
Chemical formula	C_{30}H_{42}Ni_{3}O_{12}
Molar mass	770.734 g·mol^{−1}
Appearance	dark green
Density	1.455 g/cm^{3}
Melting point	229.5 °C (445.1 °F; 502.6 K) (decomposes)
Solubility in water	H_{2}O

Hazards
- GHS labelling
Pictograms	(GHS07: Exclamation mark) (GHS08: Health hazard)
Signal word	Danger
Hazard statements	H302, H317, H334, H350
Precautionary statements	P201, P202, P261, P264, P270, P272, P280, P281, P285, P301+P312, P302+P352, P304+P341, P308+P313, P321, P330, P333+P313, P342+P311, P363, P405, P501
- Except where otherwise noted, data are given for materials in their standard state (at 25 °C [77 °F], 100 kPa). verify (what is ?) Infobox references

Nickel(II) bis(acetylacetonate) is a coordination complex with the formula [Ni(acac)_{2}]_{3}, where acac is the anion C_{5}H_{7}O^{−}_{2} derived from deprotonation of acetylacetone. It is a dark green paramagnetic solid that is soluble in organic solvents such as toluene. It reacts with water to give the blue-green diaquo complex Ni(acac)_{2}(H_{2}O)_{2}.

== Structure and properties ==
Anhydrous nickel(II) acetylacetonate exists as molecules of Ni_{3}(acac)_{6}. The three nickel atoms are approximately collinear and each pair of them is bridged by two μ_{2} oxygen atoms. Each nickel atom has tetragonally distorted octahedral geometry, caused by the difference in the length of the Ni–O bonds between the bridging and non-bridging oxygens. Ni_{3}(acac)_{6} molecules are almost centrosymmetric, despite the non-centrosymmetric point group of the cis-Ni(acac)_{2} "monomers," which is uncommon. The trimeric structure allows all nickel centers to achieve an octahedral coordination. The trimer is only formed if intramolecular sharing of oxygen centers between pairs of nickel centers occurs. The anhydrous complex has interesting magnetic properties. Down to about 80 K it exhibits normal paramagnetism with an effective magnetic moment of 3.2 μ_{B}, close to the spin-only moment expected of a d^{8} ion with two unpaired electrons. The effective moment rises to 4.1 μ_{B} at 4.3 K, due to ferromagnetic exchange interactions involving all three nickel ions.

When bound to bulkier analogues of acetylacetonate ligand, steric hindrance favors formation of the mononickel derivatives. This behavior is observed for the derivative of 3-methylacetylacetonate.

=== Dihydrate ===
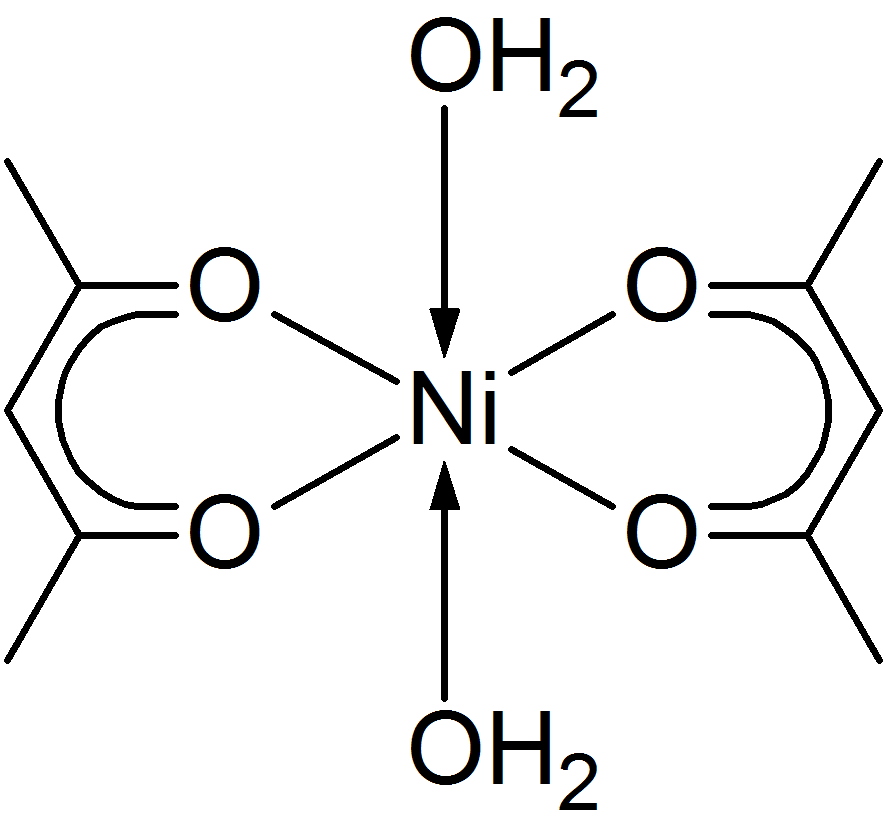
Structure of Ni(acac)_{2}(H_{2}O)_{2}.

As in the anhydrous form, the Ni(II) centres occupy octahedral coordination sites. The coordination sphere is provided by two bidentate acetylacetonate (acac) ligands and two aquo ligands. Ni(acac)_{2}(H_{2}O)_{2} exists as cis and trans isomers. Trans isomers are also observed for Ni(acac)_{2}(pyridine-N-oxide)_{2}. In the trans isomers, the axial Ni–O bonds are greater in length (210.00 pm) than the equatorial Ni–O bonds (200.85 pm and 199.61 pm).

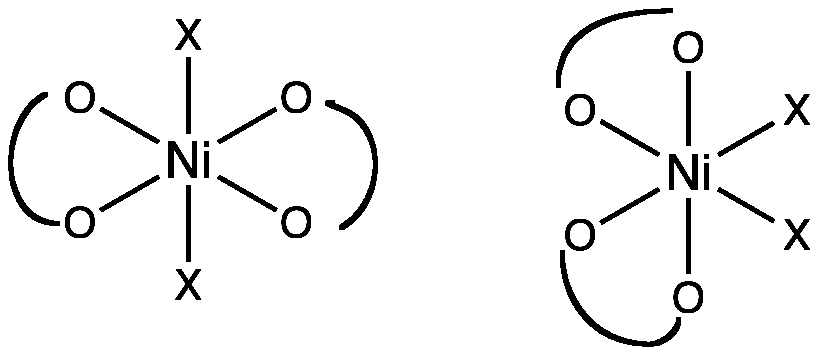
Trans and cis isomers of [Ni(acac)_{2}X_{2}] where X is a coordinating molecule

== Synthesis ==
Bis(2,4-pentanedionato)nickel(II) is prepared by treating nickel nitrate with acetylacetone in the presence of base. The product is the blue-green diaquo complex Ni(CH_{3}COCHCOCH_{3})_{2}(H_{2}O)_{2}.

Ni(NO_{3})_{2} + 2 CH_{3}COCH_{2}COCH_{3} + 2 H_{2}O + 2 NaOH → Ni(CH_{3}COCHCOCH_{3})_{2}(H_{2}O)_{2} + 2 NaNO_{3}

This complex can be dehydrated using a Dean–Stark trap by azeotropic distillation:

3 Ni(CH_{3}COCHCOCH_{3})_{2}(H_{2}O)_{2} → [Ni(CH_{3}COCHCOCH_{3})_{2}]_{3} + 6 H_{2}O

Upon heating Ni(acac)_{2}(H_{2}O)_{2} at 170–210 °C under reduced pressure (0.2–0.4 mmHg, 27–53 Pa), the anhydrous form sublimes and water is removed.

== Reactions ==
The anhydrous complex reacts with a range of Lewis bases to give monomeric adducts. Illustrative is the reaction with tetramethylethylenediamine (tmeda):

[Ni(CH_{3}COCHCOCH_{3})_{2}]_{3} + 3 tmeda → 3 Ni(CH_{3}COCHCOCH_{3})_{2}(tmeda)

Ni(acac)_{2}(H_{2}O)_{2} reacts quickly in high yield at a methine positions, producing diamides from isocyanates. Related reactions occur with diethyl azodicarboxylate and dimethyl acetylenedicarboxylate:

Ni(acac)_{2}(H_{2}O)_{2} + 2 PhNCO → Ni(O_{2}C_{5}Me_{2}CONHPh)_{2} + 2 H_{2}O

== Applications ==
The anhydrous complex is the precursor to nickel-based catalysts such as nickel bis(cyclooctadiene) and tetramethylethylenediamine(dimethyl)nickel(II).

[Ni(acac)_{2}]_{3} is a precursor for the deposition of a thin film of NiO on conductive glass substrates using sol-gel techniques.

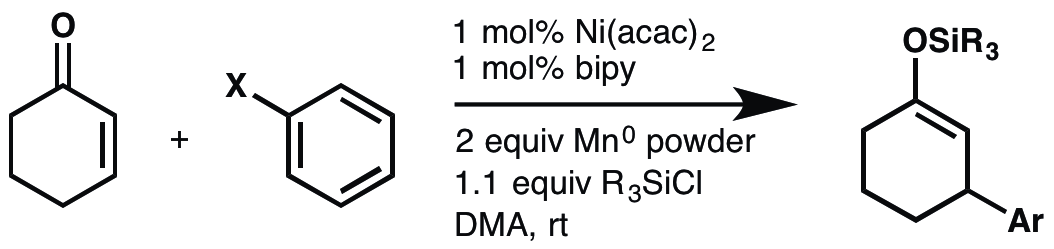
Use of "Ni(acac)_{2}" as the precatalyst.

== See also ==
- Palladium(II) bis(acetylacetonate)
- Platinum(II) bis(acetylacetonate)
