= Allylpalladium chloride dimer =

Allylpalladium(II) chloride dimer
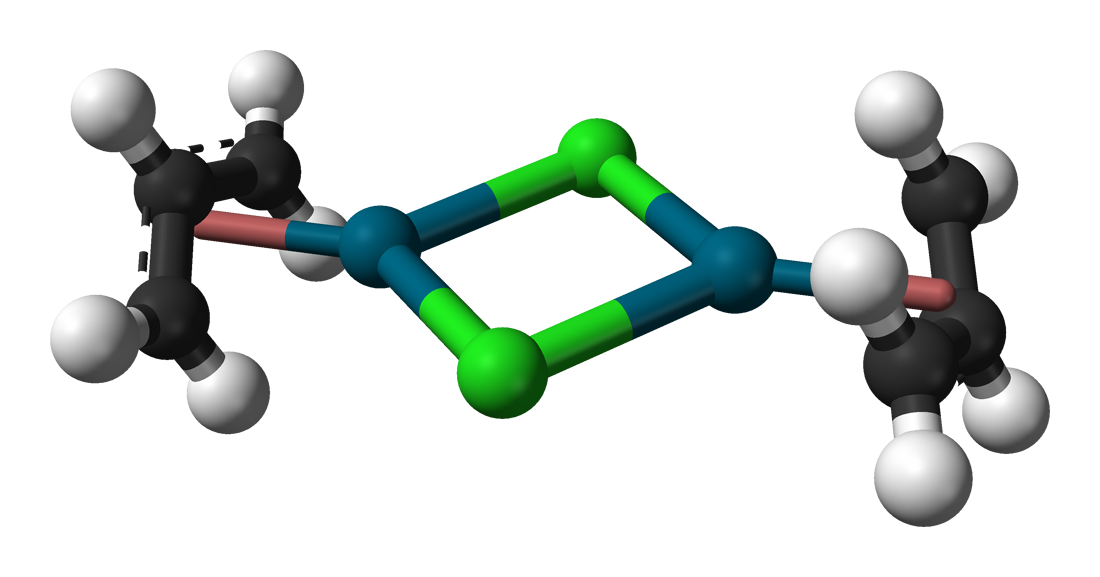

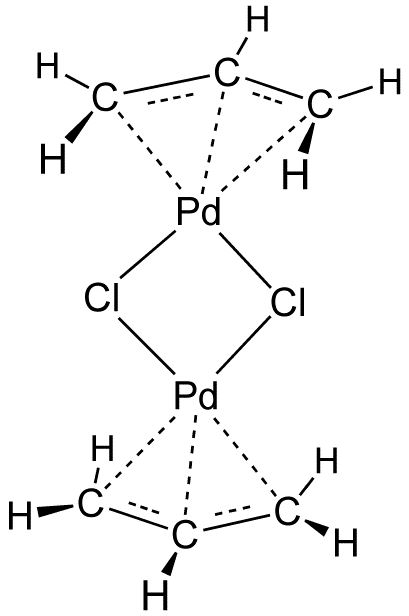

Names
- IUPAC name Allylpalladium(II) chloride dimer
- Other names Allylpalladium chloride dimer bis(allyl)di-μ-chloro-dipalladium(II); APC

Identifiers
| CAS Number | 12012-95-2 |
| 3D model (JSmol) | Interactive image |
| ChemSpider | 21171401 |
| ECHA InfoCard | 100.031.423 |
| EC Number | 234-579-8 |
| PubChem CID | 61538 |
| CompTox Dashboard (EPA) | DTXSID10897423 |
- InChI: InChI=1S/2C3H5.2ClH.2Pd/c2*1-3-2;;;;/h2*3H,1-2H2;2*1H;;/q;;;;2*+1/p-2 Key: TWKVUTXHANJYGH-UHFFFAOYSA-L; InChI=1/2C3H5.2ClH.2Pd/c2*1-3-2;;;;/h2*3H,1-2H2;2*1H;;/q;;;;2*+1/p-2/r2C3H5ClPd/c2*1-2-3-5-4/h2*2H,1,3H2 Key: TWKVUTXHANJYGH-NNVIZEFPAF
- SMILES: Cl[Pd]CC=C.C=CC[Pd]Cl

Properties
| Chemical formula | C_{6}H_{10}Cl_{2}Pd_{2} |
| Molar mass | 365.85 g/mol |
| Appearance | Pale yellow, crystalline solid |
| Melting point | decomp at 155-156 °C |
| Solubility in water | Insoluble |
| Solubility in other solvents | Chloroform benzene acetone methanol |

Structure
| Crystal structure | monoclinic |
| Space group | P2_{1}/n, No. 14 |
| Formula units (Z) | 2 |

Hazards
- GHS labelling
| Pictograms | (GHS07: Exclamation mark) |
| Signal word | Warning |
| Hazard statements | H302, H312, H315, H319, H332, H335 |
| Precautionary statements | P261, P264, P270, P271, P280, P301+P312, P302+P352, P304+P312, P304+P340, P305+P351+P338, P312, P321, P322, P330, P332+P313, P337+P313, P362, P363, P403+P233, P405, P501 |
| Safety data sheet (SDS) | http://www.colonialmetals.com/pdf/5048.pdf |

Related compounds
| Related compounds | (η^{3}-allyl)(η5 – cyclopentadienyl)palladium(II) di-μ-chlorobis(crotyl)dipalladium |
- Except where otherwise noted, data are given for materials in their standard state (at 25 °C [77 °F], 100 kPa). verify (what is ?) Infobox references

Allylpalladium(II) chloride dimer (APC) is a chemical compound with the formula [(η^{3}-C_{3}H_{5})PdCl]_{2}. This yellow air-stable compound is an important catalyst used in organic synthesis. It is one of the most widely used transition metal allyl complexes.

== Structure ==
The compound has a dimeric structure that is centrosymmetric. Each allyl group lies in a plane at an angle of about 111.5° to the square formed by the palladium and carbon atoms, and the Pd–C distances are all equal. Its unit cell is monoclinic.

== Synthesis ==
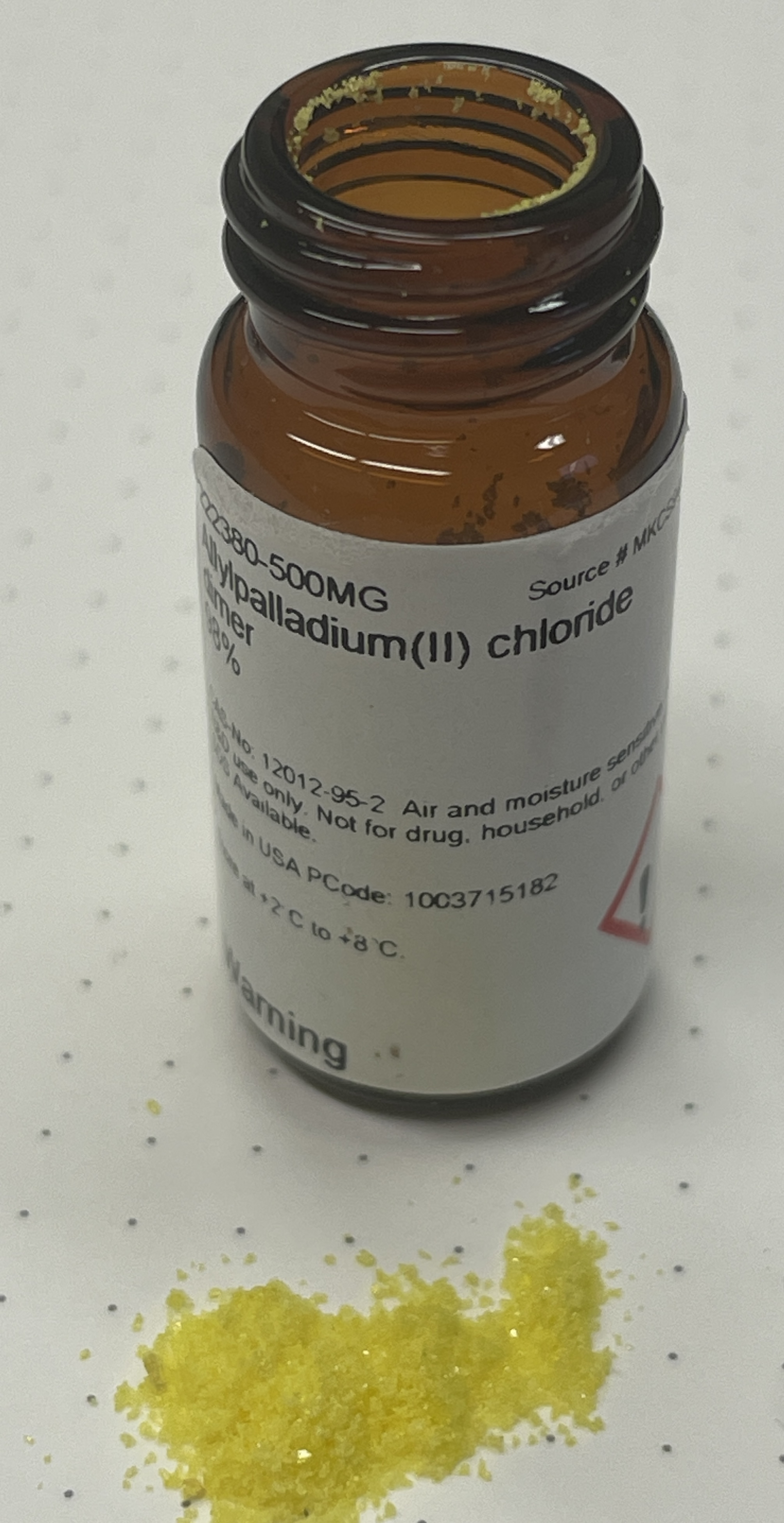
sample of allyl palladium chloride dimer

The compound is prepared by purging carbon monoxide through a methanolic aqueous solution of sodium tetrachloropalladate (prepared from palladium(II) chloride and sodium chloride), and allyl chloride.

2 Na_{2}PdCl_{4} + 2 CH_{2}=CHCH_{2}Cl + 2 CO + 2 H_{2}O → [(η^{3}-C_{3}H_{5})PdCl]_{2} + 4 NaCl + 2 CO_{2} + 4 HCl

Another method is the reaction of propene with palladium(II) trifluoroacetate, followed by ion exchange with chloride:

2 (CF_{3}COO)_{2}Pd + 2 CH_{2}=CHCH_{3} → [(η^{3}-C_{3}H_{5})Pd(CF_{3}COO)]_{2}
[(η^{3}-C_{3}H_{5})Pd(CF_{3}COO)]_{2} + 2 Cl^{−} → [(η^{3}-C_{3}H_{5})PdCl]_{2} + 2 CF_{3}COO^{−}

== Reactions ==
APC reacts with sources of cyclopentadienyl anion to give the corresponding 18e^{−} complex cyclopentadienyl allyl palladium:

[(η^{3}-C_{3}H_{5})PdCl]_{2} + 2 NaC_{5}H_{5} → 2 [(η^{5}-C_{5}H_{5})Pd(η^{3}-C_{3}H_{5})] + 2 NaCl

The dimer reacts with a variety of Lewis bases (:B) to form adducts (η^{3}-C_{3}H_{5})PdCl:B. Its reaction with pyridine and the corresponding enthalpy are:

1/2 [(η^{3}-C_{3}H_{5})PdCl]_{2} + :NC_{5}H_{5} → (η^{3}-C_{3}H_{5})PdCl:NC_{5}H_{5} ΔH=−30.1 kJ.mol^{−1}

This enthalpy corresponds to the enthalpy change for a reaction forming one mole of the product, (η^{3}-C_{3}H_{5})PdCl:NC_{5}H_{5}, from the acid dimer. The dissociation energy for the Pd dimer, which is an energy contribution prior to reaction with the donor,

[(η^{3}-C_{3}H_{5})PdCl]_{2} → 2 (η^{3}-C_{3}H_{5})PdCl

has been determined by the ECW model to be 28 kJ.mol^{−1}.

APC catalyzes many organic reactions, such as cross-coupling, nucleophilic addition to dienes, and decomposition of diazo compounds to reactive carbenes. It is also a useful precursor of other Pd catalysts.
