= Ni(COD)(DQ) =

Organonickel compound

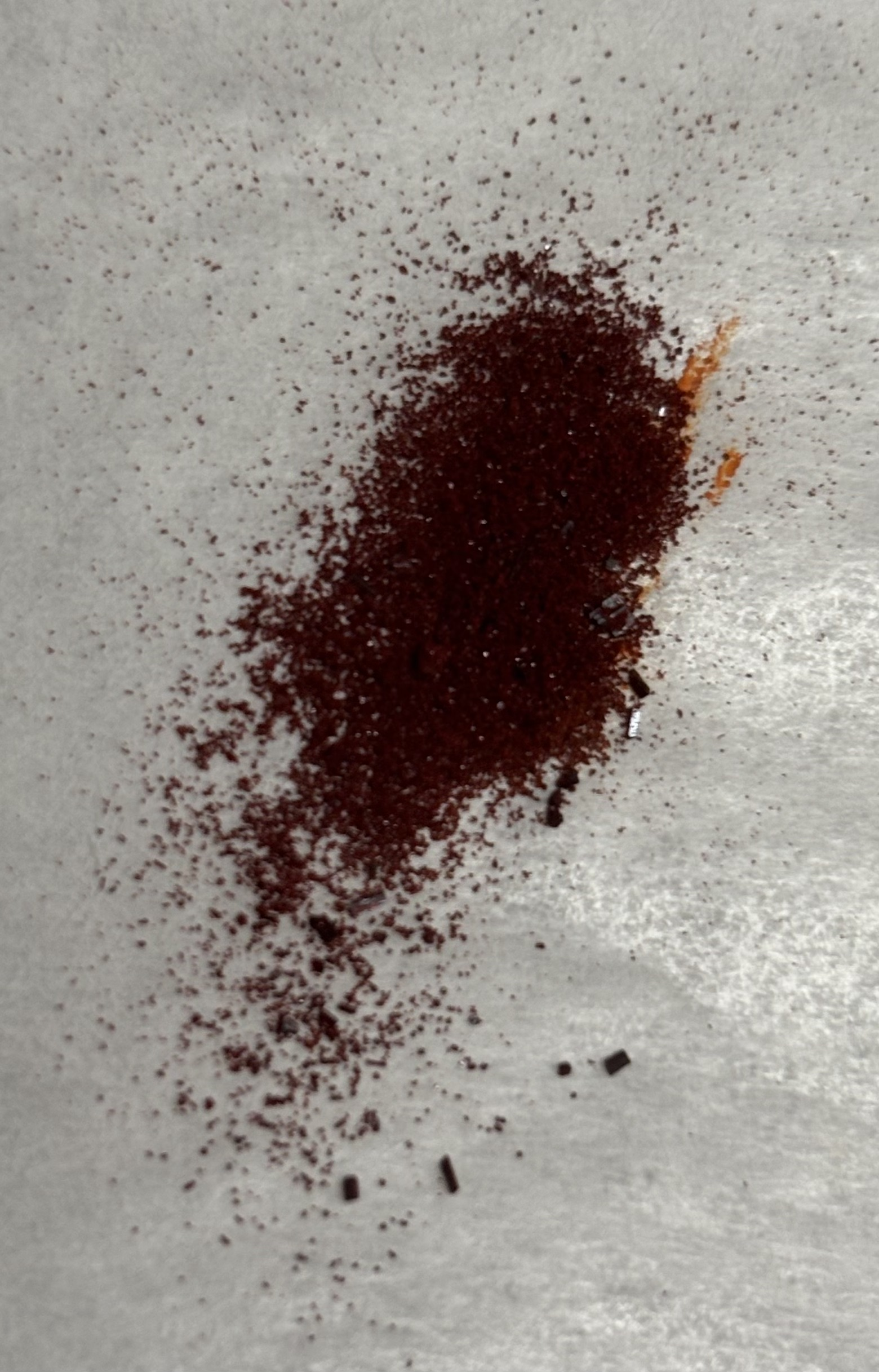
- Ni(COD)(DQ) is red in solid crystalline form

Identifiers
| CAS Number | 40759-64-6 |
| 3D model (JSmol) | Interactive image |
| ChemSpider | 114868831 |
| PubChem CID | 170906979 |
- InChI: InChI=1S/C10H12O2.C8H12.Ni/c1-5-6(2)10(12)8(4)7(3)9(5)11;1-2-4-6-8-7-5-3-1;/h1-4H3;1-2,7-8H,3-6H2; Key: KMQIRZWEKVPSAZ-UHFFFAOYSA-N
- SMILES: CC1=C(C(=O)C(=C(C1=O)C)C)C.C1CC=CCCC=C1.[Ni]

Properties
| Chemical formula | C_{18}H_{24}NiO_{2} |
| Molar mass | 331.081 g·mol^{−1} |
- Except where otherwise noted, data are given for materials in their standard state (at 25 °C [77 °F], 100 kPa). Infobox references

Ni(COD)(DQ), formally known as (1,5-cyclooctadiene)(duroquinone)nickel(0), is an organonickel compound with the empirical formula NiC_{18}H_{24}O_{2}. It is a coordination complex composed of a nickel(0) center ligated by a 1,5-cyclooctadiene (COD) and a duroquinone (DQ) ligand. The compound is of interest in organometallic chemistry because despite being an 18-electron complex, Ni(COD)(DQ) exhibits reactivity not found in more common Ni(0) sources and serves as a useful precursor in homogeneous catalysis and nickel-mediated cross-coupling reactions.

== History ==
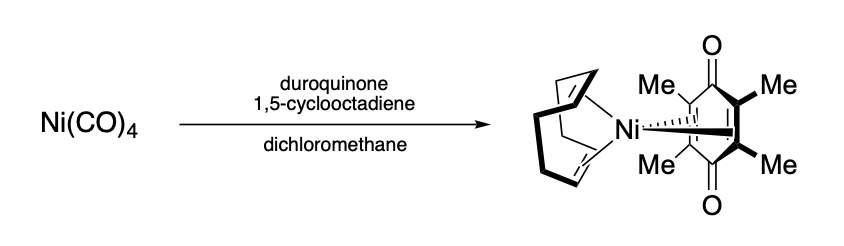
The first synthetic route to Ni(COD)(DQ) proposed by Schrauzer and coworkers

The complex was first reported by Schrauzer in 1962 and synthesized by refluxing Ni(CO)_{4}, duroquinone, and cyclooctadiene in dry dichloromethane (85% yield). After the discovery of ferrocene in the early 1950s, Schrauzer aimed to develop new, stable, transition metal–olefin sandwich complexes. Decades later, Ni(COD)(DQ) gained renewed attention when Keary Engle at Scripps Research identified it in 2020 as a highly effective Ni(0) precatalyst. Ni(COD)(DQ) was found to be an isoelectronic and isostructural, but air and moisture stable alternative to Bis(cyclooctadiene)nickel(0) (Ni(COD)_{2})—another prominent Ni(0) pre-catalyst.

== Structure and Bonding ==
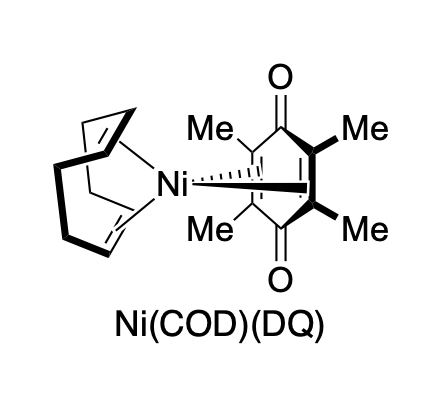
The reported structure of Ni(COD)(DQ)

Ni(COD)(DQ) is a tetrahedral complex where the nickel(0) center is coordinated by one COD ligand and one duroquinone ligand. The DQ ligand is a strong π-acceptor and helps stabilize the low-valent nickel center through π-backbonding. The electron-rich nature of the nickel(0) center and the labile coordination environment make the complex a valuable source of Ni(0) for catalytic transformations.

== Synthesis ==
Ni(COD)(DQ) is typically synthesized by the reaction of Ni(COD)2 with duroquinone (DQ) under inert atmosphere conditions:

Ni(COD)_{2} + DQ → Ni(COD)(DQ) + COD

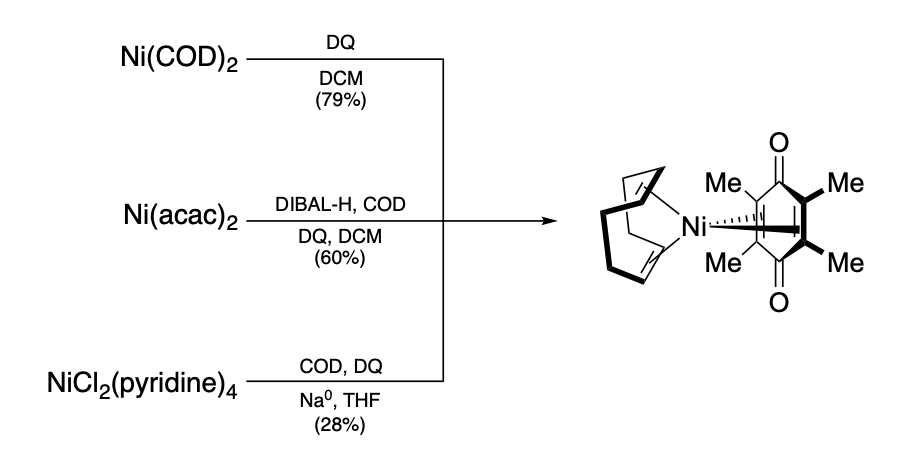
More recently developed alternative syntheses of Ni(COD)(DQ)

This reaction proceeds readily at mild temperature and provides Ni(COD)(DQ) in good yields. Alternatively, Ni(COD)(DQ) can be prepared from various air-stable Ni(II) sources including Ni(acac)_{2} or NiCl_{2}(pyridine)_{4} with DIBAL-H or sodium as the reductant respectively.

== Applications ==
Ni(COD)(DQ) has proved useful in a variety of catalytic reactions as an alternative to Ni(COD)_{2} as it is air and moisture stable and has demonstrated greater thermal stability. These features allow for its use in catalytic reactions without the need for rigorous inert atmosphere techniques, making it attractive for bench-scale experimentation. Ni(COD)(DQ) serves as a competent Ni(0) precatalyst for a wide variety of nickel-catalyzed transformations:

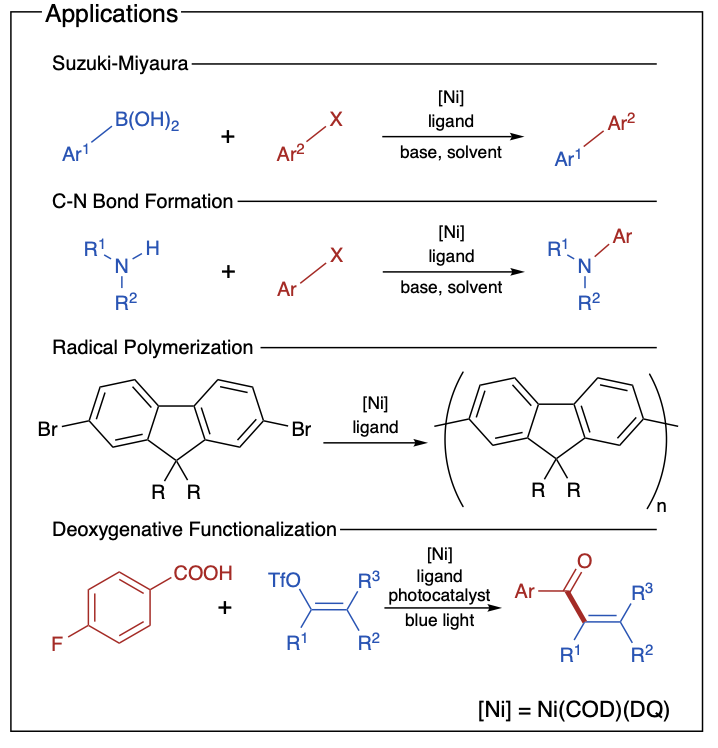
Recent catalytic applications involving Ni(COD)(DQ)

- Cross-Coupling Reactions: Ni(COD)(DQ) has been applied in classical cross-coupling methodologies including the Suzuki reaction. These transformations involve oxidative addition of aryl or alkyl halides, followed by transmetallation and reductive elimination to forge C–C bonds. The precatalyst’s stability allows for clean initiation and consistent performance under elevated temperatures.
- C–N Bond Formation: In the field of aryl halide amination, Ni(COD)(DQ) has enabled efficient Buchwald–Hartwig-type couplings. Its use as a precatalyst for forming N,N-diarylsulfonamides under relatively mild conditions has been demonstrated, highlighting the ability of Ni(COD)(DQ)-derived catalysts to mediate challenging C–N bond formations.
- Radical-Type Coupling and Dehalogenative Transformations: Ni(COD)(DQ) has been successfully used in radical-mediated aryl–aryl couplings, as well as dehalogenative coupling polycondensation reactions to produce π-conjugated polymers. These transformations exploit the redox flexibility of nickel(0) complexes in single-electron pathways and highlight Ni(COD)(DQ)'s compatibility with radical intermediates.
- Deoxygenative Functionalization: Ni(COD)(DQ) has been used as a precatalyst in the visible-light-driven, photoredox/nickel dual-catalytic deoxygenative alkenylation of aromatic carboxylic acids. This system allows for the formation of all-carbon tetrasubstituted alkenes via coupling of in situ-generated acyl radicals with alkenyl triflates. The reaction proceeds under ambient conditions and without the need for inert atmosphere, offering broad substrate scope, high stereoselectivity, and compatibility with complex molecules.
