= Organonickel(IV) complex =

Organonickel(IV) complex are organonickel compounds that feature nickel in the +4 oxidation state. These high-valent nickel compounds are intermediates or models thereof for various catalytic reactions.

== Representative preparation ==
Ni(IV) complexes are typically supported by highly basic and chelating ligands. They are often produced by oxidation of related Ni(II) and Ni(III) complexes using both conventional and exotic oxidants, such as ferrocenium and S-(trifluoromethyl)dibenzothiophenium triflate (Umemoto reagent). For example, one of the first isolated Ni^{IV} complexes that was used in a cross coupling transformation was reported by Linden and Dimitrov in 2003 and was prepared by simple air-induced oxidation of the following anionic Ni^{II} complex:

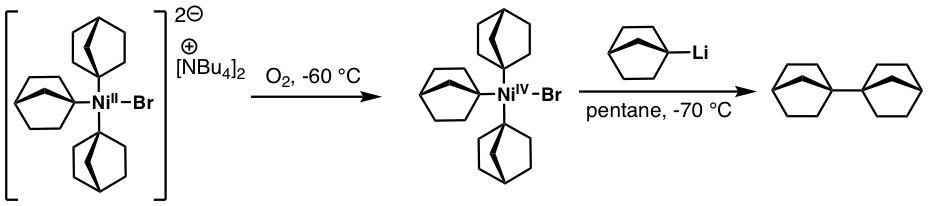
Oxidation of Ni(II) to Ni(IV) using O_{2}.

== Reactivity and synthetic transformations ==
=== Carbon-heteroatom bond formation ===
Studies reported by Sanford and Camasso in 2015 revealed the ability of a Ni^{IV} organometallic complex to deliver carbon(sp^{3})-oxygen, carbon(sp^{3})-nitrogen, and carbon(sp^{3})-sulfur bonds. The Ni^{IV} species was generated by oxidation of a nickel(II) trispyrazolylborate complex.

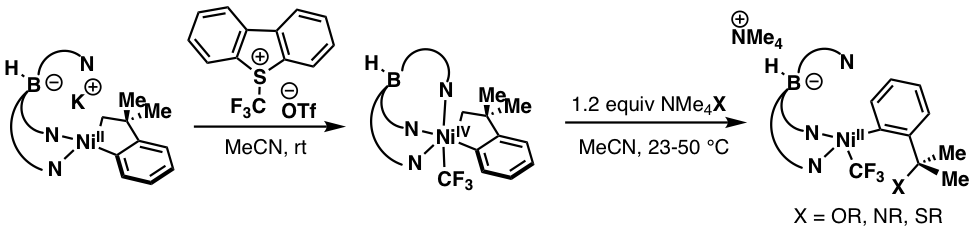
Oxidation of Ni(II) precursors with Umimoto reagent.

=== C-H activation ===
In 2014, Chatani and coworkers proposed that a Ni^{IV} intermediate was formed during an aminoquinoline-directed aliphatic C-H activation process using diaryliodonium salts as an oxidant.

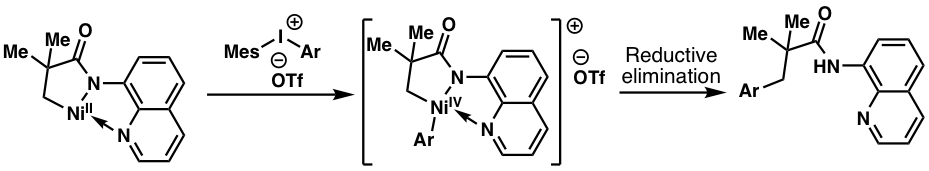
AQ-directed C-H activation

=== Trifluoromethylations ===
Ni^{IV} can perform challenging trifluoromethylation reactions on (hetero)arenes. A representative method is shown below, reported by Nebra and coworkers in 2017. Here, a six-coordinate Ni^{IV} complex transfers a CF_{3} ligand to a functionalized arene.

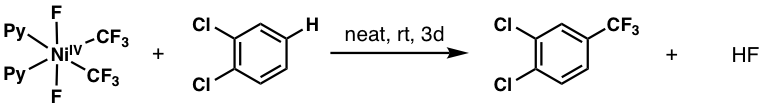
Stoichiometric trifluromethylation by a Ni(IV) reagent.

A catalytic variant was reported by Sanford and coworkers in 2019. The mechanism for this transformation is shown in the following scheme. Here, the key Ni^{IV} intermediate undergoes a slow homolysis to produce a Ni^{III} intermediate and a trifluoromethyl radical, which can promote propagation of the catalytic cycle.

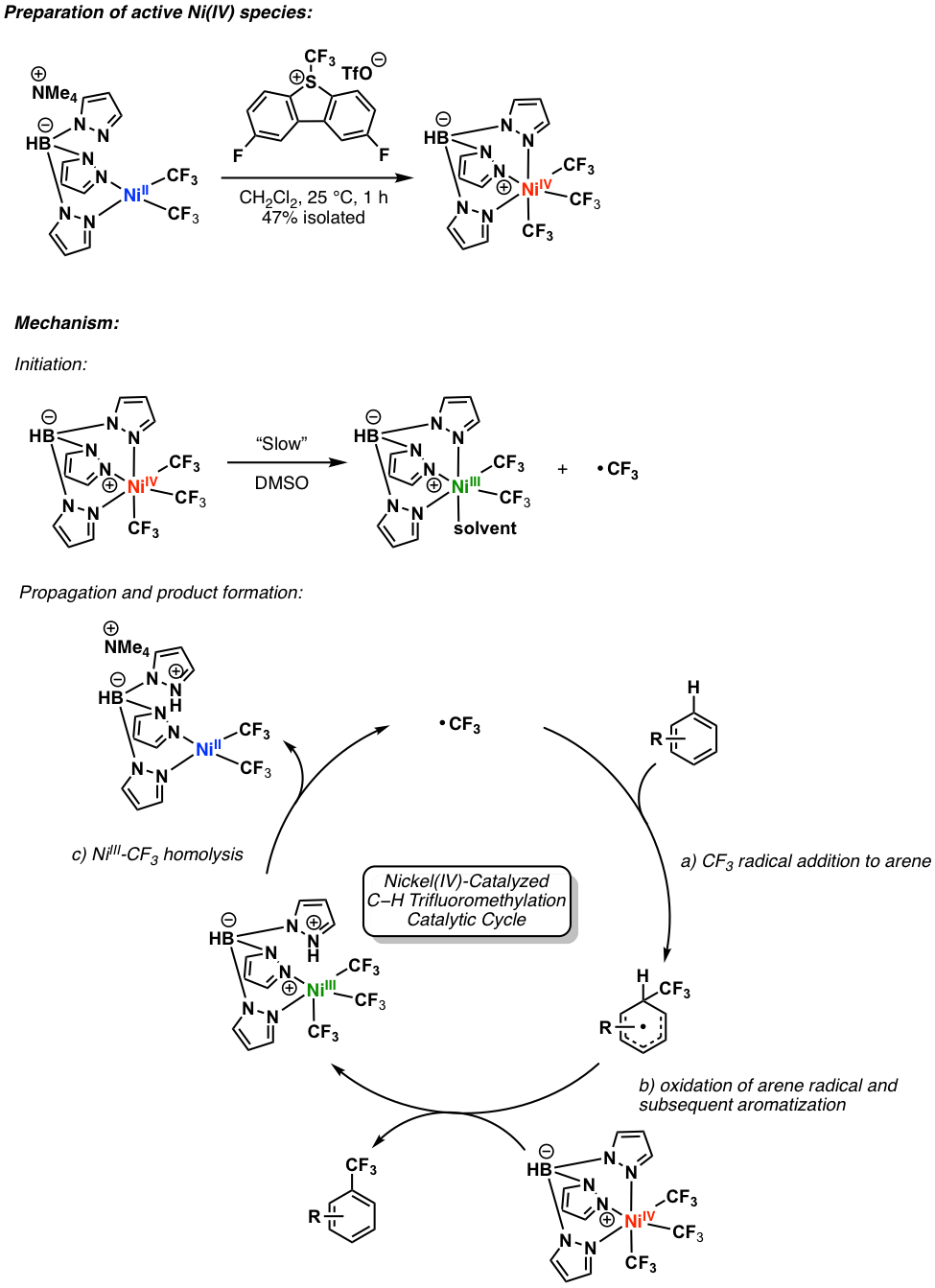
Catalytic trifluoromethylation of arenes via nickel(IV) intermediates.
