= Tetrabenzylzirconium =

Identifiers
CAS Number	24356-01-2
3D model (JSmol)	Interactive image
ChemSpider	10254475
PubChem CID	520121
CompTox Dashboard (EPA)	DTXSID80334254
- InChI: InChI=1S/4C7H7.Zr/c4*1-7-5-3-2-4-6-7;/h4*2-6H,1H2;/q4*-1;+4 Key: QSLMQGXOMLSFAW-UHFFFAOYSA-N
- SMILES: [CH2-]C1=CC=CC=C1.[CH2-]C1=CC=CC=C1.[CH2-]C1=CC=CC=C1.[CH2-]C1=CC=CC=C1.[Zr+4]

Properties
Chemical formula	C_{28}H_{28}Zr
Molar mass	455.756 g·mol^{−1}
Appearance	orange solid
Density	1.34-1.39 g/cm^{3}
Melting point	133–134 °C (271–273 °F; 406–407 K)
- Except where otherwise noted, data are given for materials in their standard state (at 25 °C [77 °F], 100 kPa). Infobox references

Tetrabenzylzirconium is an organozirconium compound with the formula Zr(CH_{2}C_{6}H_{5})_{4}. The molecule features diamagnetic Zr(IV) bonded to four benzyl ligands. It is an orange air- and photo-sensitive solid, which is soluble in hydrocarbon solvents. The compound is a precursor to catalysts for the polymerization of olefins.

== Structure, synthesis, reactions ==
Structure of tetrabenzylzirconium as determined by X-ray crystallography, with H atoms omitted for clarity.

X-ray crystallography demonstrates that the benzyl ligands are highly flexible: one polymorph features four η^{2}-ligands, whereas another has two η^{1}- and two η^{2}-benzyl ligands.

The compound is prepared by combining benzylmagnesium chloride and zirconium tetrachloride in diethyl ether.

Tetrabenzylzirconium readily undergoes protonolysis, e.g. with hydrogen chloride:

Zr(CH_{2}C_{6}H_{5})_{4} + HCl → Zr(CH_{2}C_{6}H_{5})_{3}Cl + CH_{3}C_{6}H_{5}
