= Günther Wilke =

German chemist (1925–2016)

- Born: 23 February 1925; Heidelberg, Germany
- Died: 9 December 2016 (aged 91)
- Known for: Organo-Nickel Chemistry
- Awards: Willard Gibbs Award (1991); Wilhelm Exner Medal (1980).
- Scientific career
- Fields: inorganic chemistry
- Workplaces: Max Planck Institute for Coal Research

Günther Wilke (23 February 1925 – 9 December 2016) was a German chemist who was influential in organometallic chemistry. He was the director of the Max Planck Institute for Coal Research (Max-Planck-Institut für Kohlenforschung) from 1967–1992, succeeding Karl Ziegler in that post. During Wilke's era, the MPI made several discoveries and achieved some financial independence from patents and a gift from the Ziegler family. The institute continued as a center of excellence in organometallic chemistry.

Wilke's own area of interest focused on homogeneous catalysis by nickel complexes. His group discovered or developed several compounds including Ni(1,5-cyclooctadiene)_{2}, Ni(allyl)_{2}, Ni(C_{2}H_{4})_{3}. Some of these complexes are useful catalysts for the oligomerization of dienes. He died in 2016 at the age of 91.

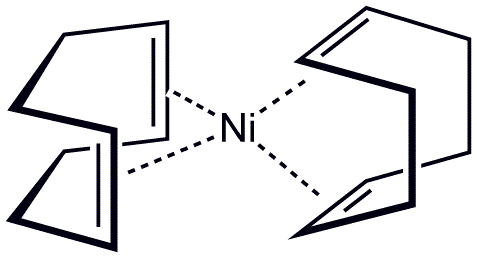
Wilke is credited with the discovery of bis(cyclooctadiene)nickel(0), a useful homogeneous catalyst.

== Honours and awards ==
- Seven honorary doctorates
- corresponding member of the math and science class abroad
- Wilhelm Exner Medal in 1980.
- Former Vice President of the Max Planck Society (1978-1990)
- Member of the North Rhine-Westphalian Academy of Science (President 1994-1997)
- Member of the German Academy of Sciences Leopoldina, Halle
- Member of the Academia Europaea
- Foreign member of the Royal Netherlands Academy of Arts and Sciences (1977)
- Austrian Decoration for Science and Art
- President of the German Chemical Society (Gesellschaft Deutscher Chemiker)
- Chairman of the Society of German Scientists and Physicians
- Grand Cross of the Order of Merit of the Federal Republic of Germany (1987)
