= Tetramethylethylenediamine =

- Skeletal formula of tetramethylethylenediamine with some implicit hydrogens shown

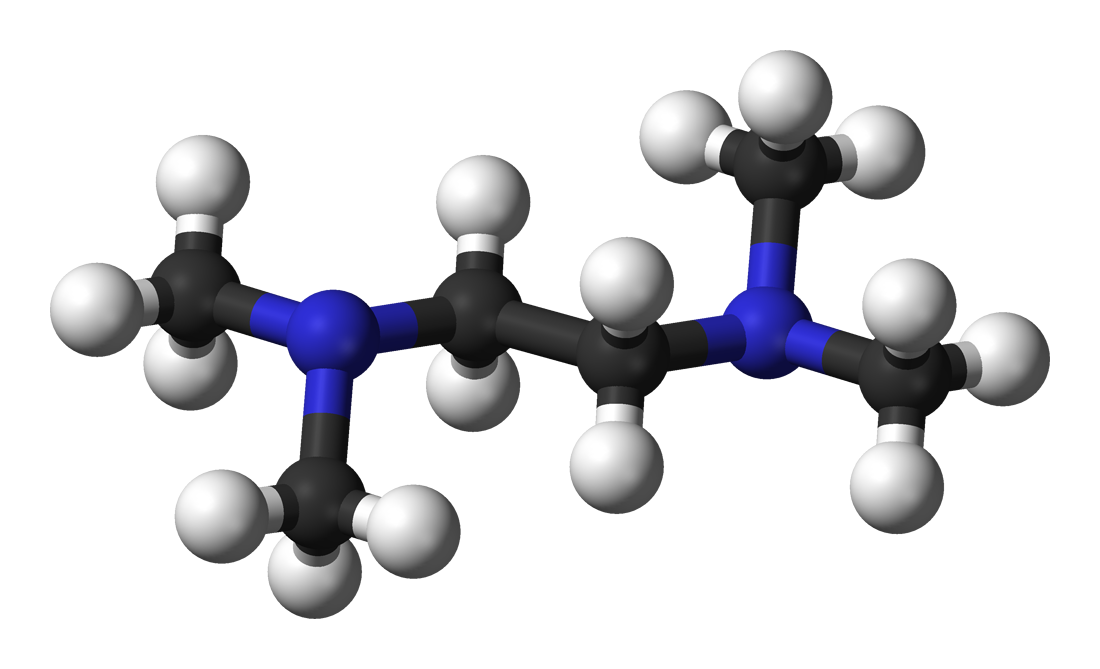
- Ball and stick model of tetramethylethylenediamine

Names
- Preferred IUPAC name N,N,N′,N′-Tetramethylethane-1,2-diamine

Identifiers
CAS Number	110-18-9
3D model (JSmol)	Interactive image
Abbreviations	TMEDA, TEMED
Beilstein Reference	1732991
ChEBI	CHEBI:32850
ChemSpider	7746
ECHA InfoCard	100.003.405
EC Number	203-744-6
Gmelin Reference	2707
MeSH	N,N,N',N'-tetramethylethylenediamine
PubChem CID	8037
RTECS number	KV7175000
UNII	K90JUB7941
UN number	2372
CompTox Dashboard (EPA)	DTXSID5026122
- InChI: InChI=1S/C6H16N2/c1-7(2)5-6-8(3)4/h5-6H2,1-4H3 Key: KWYHDKDOAIKMQN-UHFFFAOYSA-N
- SMILES: CN(C)CCN(C)C

Properties
Chemical formula	C_{6}H_{16}N_{2}
Molar mass	116.208 g·mol^{−1}
Appearance	Colorless liquid
Odor	Fishy, ammoniacal
Density	0.7765 g mL^{−1} (at 20 °C)
Melting point	−58.6 °C; −73.6 °F; 214.5 K
Boiling point	121.1 °C; 249.9 °F; 394.2 K
Solubility in water	Miscible
Acidity (pK_{a})	8.97
Basicity (pK_{b})	5.85
Refractive index (n_{D})	1.4179 (20 °C)

Hazards
- GHS labelling
Pictograms	(GHS02: Flammable) (GHS05: Corrosive) (GHS07: Exclamation mark)
Signal word	Danger
Hazard statements	H225, H302, H314, H332
Precautionary statements	P210, P280, P305+P351+P338, P310
NFPA 704 (fire diamond)	2 4 1
Flash point	20 °C (68 °F; 293 K)
Explosive limits	0.98–9.08%
- Lethal dose or concentration (LD, LC)
LD_{50} (median dose)	5.39 g kg^{−1} (dermal, rabbit); 268 mg kg^{−1} (oral, rat)

Related compounds
Related amines	Triethylenetetramine
Related compounds	Tetraacetylethylenediamine; Ethylenediaminetetraacetic acid; Ethambutol

Supplementary data page
- Tetramethylethylenediamine (data page)
- Except where otherwise noted, data are given for materials in their standard state (at 25 °C [77 °F], 100 kPa). verify (what is ?) Infobox references

Tetramethylethylenediamine (TMEDA or TEMED, sometimes TMEN) is a chemical compound with the formula (CH_{3})_{2}NCH_{2}CH_{2}N(CH_{3})_{2}. This species is derived from ethylenediamine by replacement of the four amine hydrogens with four methyl groups. It is a colorless liquid, although old samples often appear yellow. Its odor is similar to that of rotting fish.

== As a reagent in synthesis ==
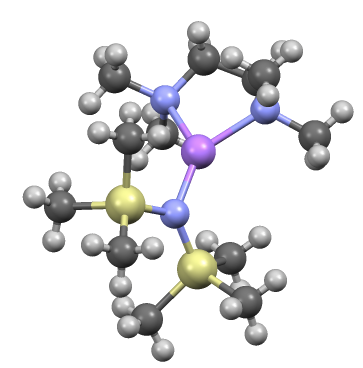
Structure of the TMEDA adduct of LiN(Si(CH_{3})_{3})_{2}. Color code: blue = N, lavender = Li, yellow = Si

TMEDA is widely employed as a ligand for metal ions. It forms stable complexes with many metal halides, e.g. zinc chloride and copper(I) iodide, giving complexes that are soluble in organic solvents. In such complexes, TMEDA serves as a bidentate ligand.

TMEDA has an affinity for lithium ions. When mixed with n-butyllithium, TMEDA's nitrogen atoms coordinate to the lithium, forming a cluster of higher reactivity than the tetramer or hexamer that n-butyllithium normally adopts. BuLi/TMEDA is able to metallate or even doubly metallate many substrates including benzene, furan, thiophene, N-alkylpyrroles, and ferrocene. Many anionic organometallic complexes have been isolated as their [Li(tmeda)_{2}]^{+} complexes. In such complexes [Li(tmeda)_{2}]^{+} behaves like a quaternary ammonium salt, such as [NEt_{4}]^{+}.

sec-Butyllithium/TMEDA is a useful combination in organic synthesis where the n-butyl analogue adds to substrate. TMEDA is still capable of forming a metal complex with Li in this case as mentioned above.

== In molecular biology ==
TEMED is a common reagent in molecular biology laboratories, as a polymerizing agent for polyacrylamide gels in the protein analysis technique SDS-PAGE.

== Other uses ==
The complexes (TMEDA)Ni(CH_{3})_{2} and [(TMEDA)Ni(o-tolyl)Cl] illustrate the use of tmeda to stabilize homogeneous catalysts.

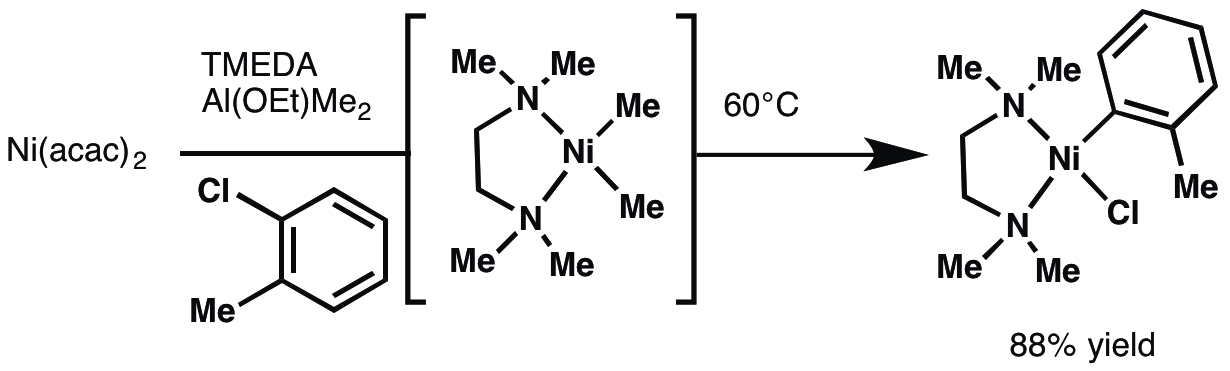
Synthesis of [(TMEDA)Ni(o-tolyl)Cl]

== Related compounds ==
- H_{2}NCMe_{2}−CMe_{2}NH_{2}, also referred to as tetramethylethylenediamine.
- Bis(dimethylamino)methane, Me_{2}NCH_{2}NMe_{2}
