= Allylmagnesium bromide =

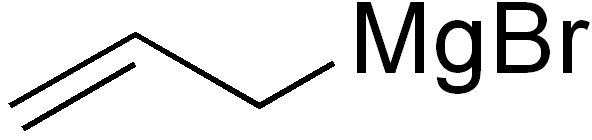

Names
- IUPAC name Allylmagnesium bromide
- Systematic IUPAC name Prop-2-enylmagnesium bromide

Identifiers
CAS Number	1730-25-2
3D model (JSmol)	Interactive image
ChemSpider	10796765
ECHA InfoCard	100.015.497
PubChem CID	74413
CompTox Dashboard (EPA)	DTXSID30938266
- InChI: InChI=1S/C3H5.BrH.Mg/c1-3-2;;/h3H,1-2H2;1H;/q;;+1/p-1 Key: FEMBXICCJNZMMC-UHFFFAOYSA-M; InChI=1/C3H5.BrH.Mg/c1-3-2;;/h3H,1-2H2;1H;/q;;+1/p-1/rC3H5Mg.BrH/c1-2-3-4;/h2H,1,3H2;1H/q+1;/p-1 Key: FEMBXICCJNZMMC-NCRCPWRRAY
- SMILES: [Br-].[Mg+]CC=C

Properties
Chemical formula	C_{3}H_{5}BrMg
Molar mass	145.282 g·mol^{−1}
- Except where otherwise noted, data are given for materials in their standard state (at 25 °C [77 °F], 100 kPa). verify (what is ?) Infobox references

Allylmagnesium bromide is a Grignard reagent used for introducing the allyl group. It is commonly available as a solution in diethyl ether. It may be synthesized by treatment of magnesium with allyl bromide while maintaining the reaction temperature below 0 °C to suppress formation of hexadiene. Allyl chloride can also be used in place of the bromide to give allylmagnesium chloride. These reagents are used to prepare metal allyl complexes.
