= Platinum(II) bis(acetylacetonate) =

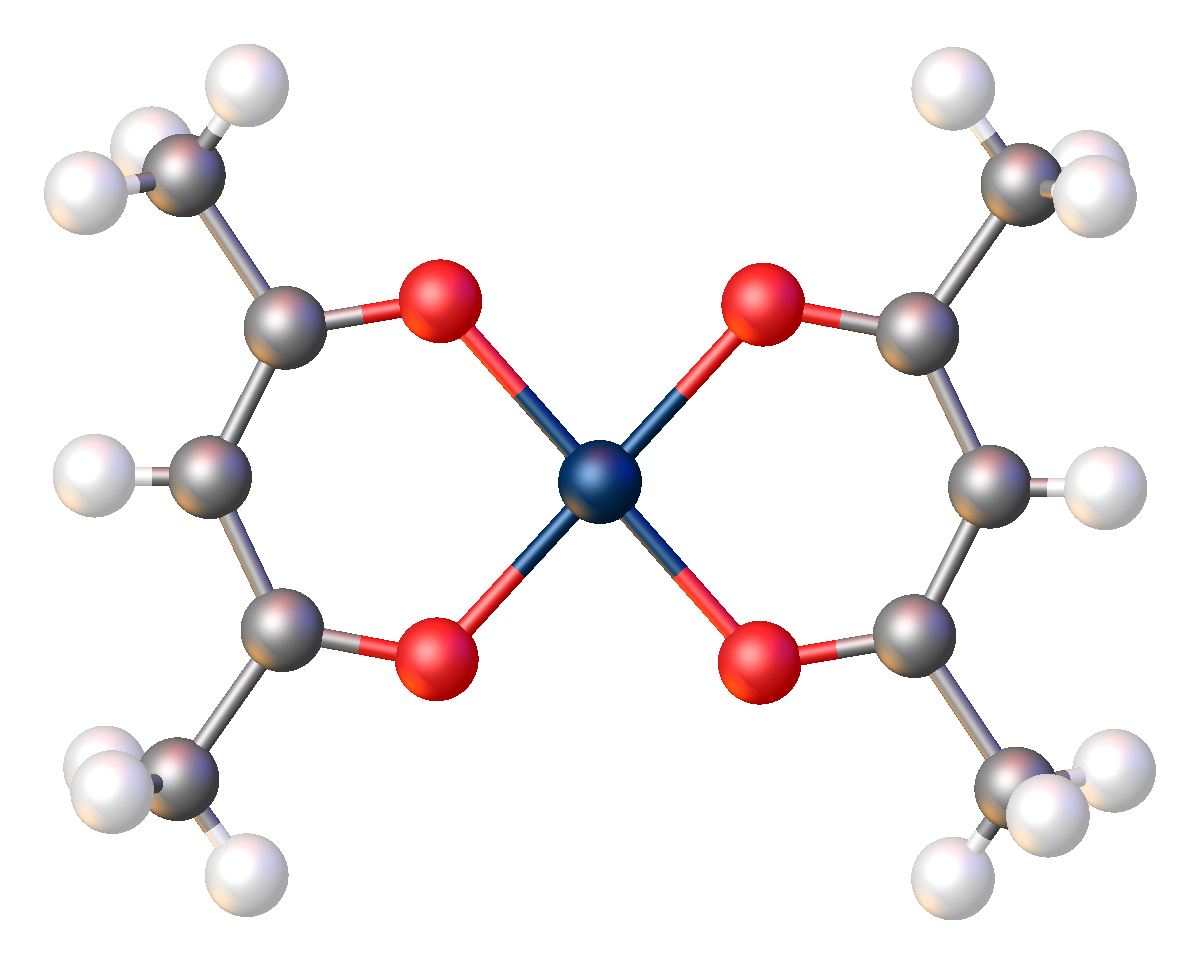

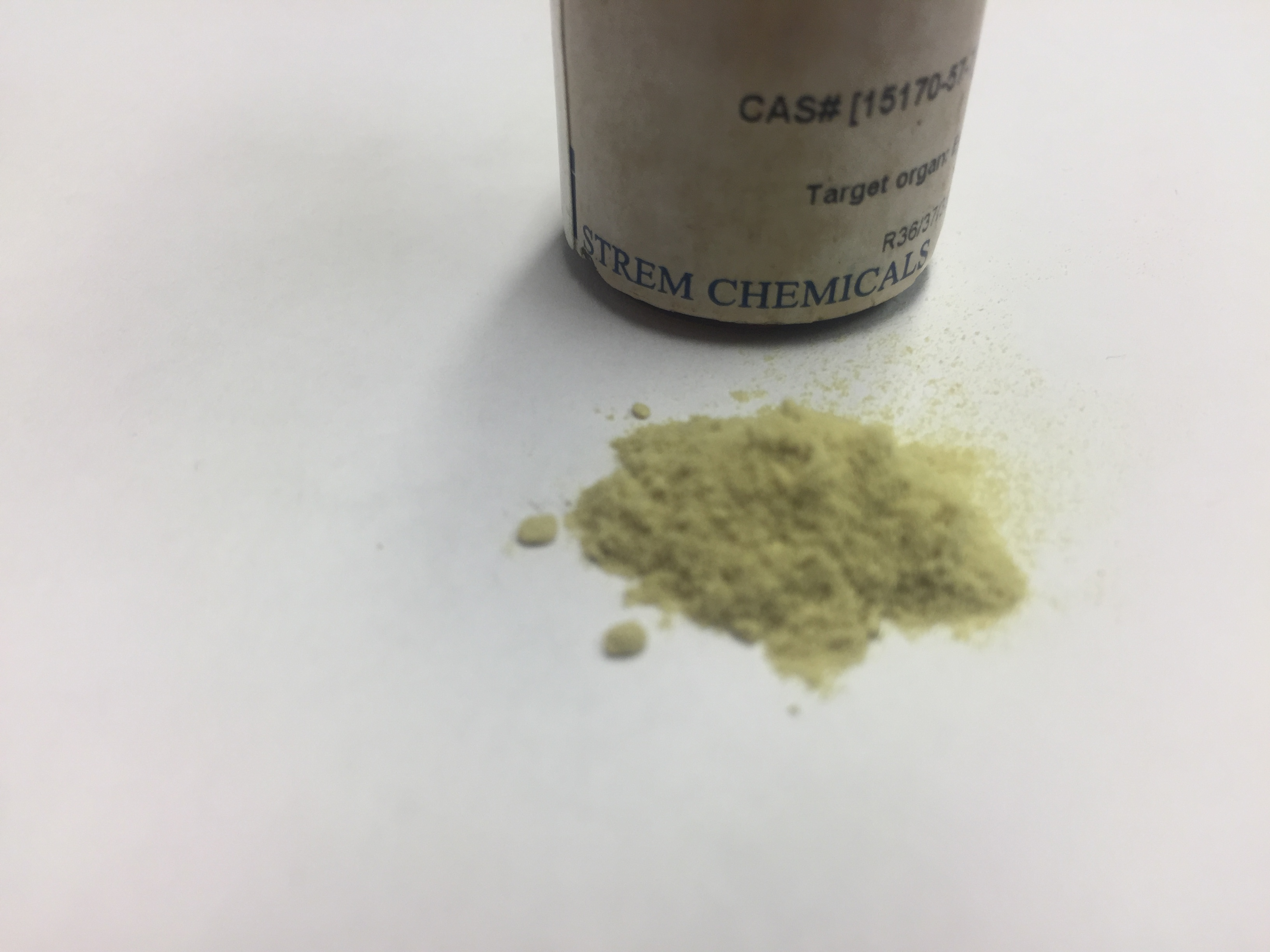

Names
- IUPAC name Bis(acetylacetonato)platinum(II)
- Systematic IUPAC name Bis[(Z)-4-oxopent-2-en-2-olato-κ^{2}O,O′]platinum(II)
- Other names Bis(2,4-pentanedionato)platinum; Platinum bis(acetylacetonate); Bis(acetylacetonato)platinum

Identifiers
CAS Number	15170-57-7
3D model (JSmol)	coordination form: Interactive image; ionic form: Interactive image
ChemSpider	4588258
ECHA InfoCard	100.035.642
EC Number	239-223-5
PubChem CID	10960186
- InChI: InChI=1S/2C5H8O2.Pt/c2*1-4(6)3-5(2)7;/h2*3,6H,1-2H3;/b2*4-3-; Key: VEJOYRPGKZZTJW-FDGPNNRMSA-N
- SMILES: coordination form: CC(=C[C-](C)O1)O[Pt+2]12OC(=C[C-](C)O2)C; ionic form: O=C(C)/C=C(C)\[O-].O=C(C)/C=C(C)\[O-].[Pt+2]

Properties
Chemical formula	C_{10}H_{14}O_{4}Pt
Molar mass	393.302 g·mol^{−1}
Appearance	yellow solid
Density	2.362 g/cm^{3}
Melting point	239.4 C (dec.)
Solubility in water	insoluble

Hazards
- GHS labelling
Pictograms	(GHS07: Exclamation mark) (GHS08: Health hazard)
Signal word	Warning
Hazard statements	H302, H312, H315, H319, H332, H335, H361
Precautionary statements	P201, P202, P261, P264, P270, P271, P280, P281, P301+P312, P302+P352, P304+P312, P304+P340, P305+P351+P338, P308+P313, P312, P321, P322, P330, P332+P313, P337+P313, P362, P363, P403+P233, P405, P501
- Except where otherwise noted, data are given for materials in their standard state (at 25 °C [77 °F], 100 kPa). Infobox references

Platinum(II) bis(acetylacetonate) is the coordination compound with the formula Pt(O_{2}C_{5}H_{7})_{2}, abbreviated Pt(acac)_{2}. The homoleptic acetylacetonate complex of platinum(II), it is a yellow, benzene-soluble solid. According to X-ray crystallography, the Pt center is square planar. The compound is a widely used precursor to platinum-based catalysts.

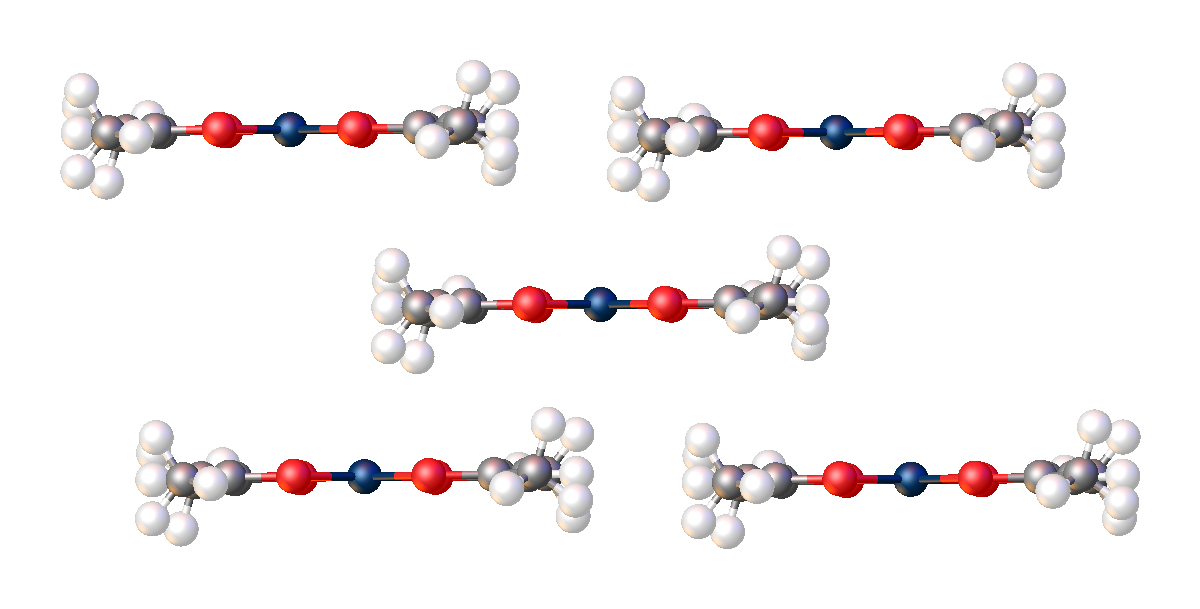
Packing of Pt(acac)_{2} molecules within a crystal.

The complex is prepared by the reaction of the platinum(II) aquo complex [Pt(H_{2}O)_{4}]^{2+} with acetylacetone.

== See also ==
- Palladium(II) bis(acetylacetonate)
- Nickel(II) bis(acetylacetonate)
