= Robert Hausinger =

American microbiologist

Robert P. Hausinger is an American microbiologist, well-cited in his field, currently at Michigan State University and an Elected Fellow of the American Society for Microbiology.
