= Transition metal allyl complex =

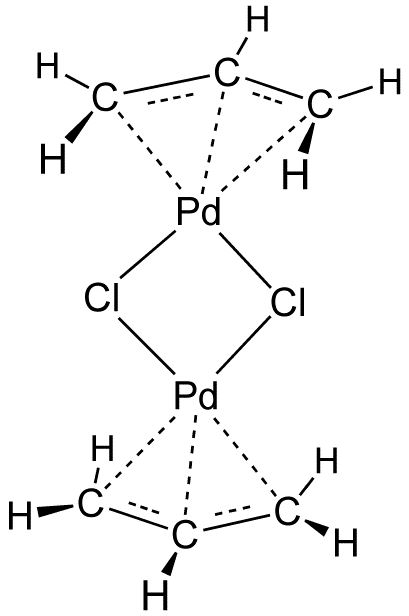
Structure of allylpalladium chloride dimer

Transition-metal allyl complexes are coordination complexes with allyl and its derivatives as ligands. The allyl group, the connectivity CH_{2}=CHCH_{2}−, binds to metal predominantly to form π-allyl complexes.

== π-Allyl complexes ==
In π-allyl complexes, all three carbon atoms bind to the metal. This bonding mode is referred to as η^{3}-allyl, meaning three contiguous atoms form bonds to the metal. π-Allyl is classified as an LX-type ligand in the LXZ ligand classification scheme, serving as a 3e^{–} donor using neutral electron counting and a 4e^{–} donor using ionic electron counting. Characteristically, the central carbon binds more tightly to the metal, as verified by X-ray crystallography. In bis(allyl)nickel, the Ni-C(central) distance is 198 picometers, and the two flanking Ni-C distances are 202 pm.

Substituents on the allyl group are also common:

- 2-methallyl.
- 1-methylallyl (crotyl)

=== Homoleptic complexes ===
- bis(allyl)nickel
- bis(allyl)palladium
- bis(allyl)platinum
- tris(allyl)chromium
- tris(allyl)rhodium
- tris(allyl)iridium

=== Mixed ligand complexes ===
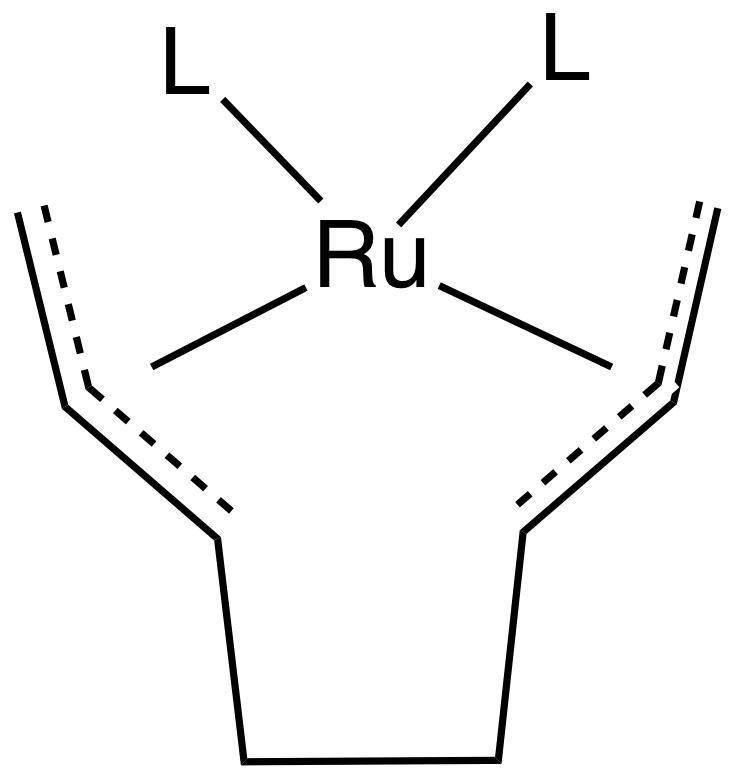
General structure of a chelating bis(allyl) complex of Ru (L = alkene, phosphine)

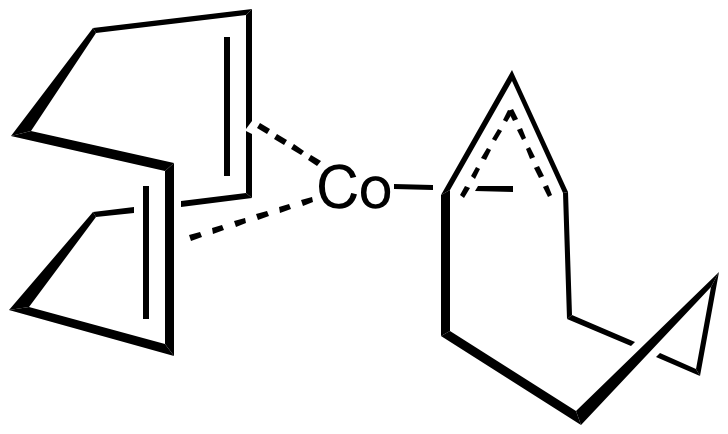
Co(1,5-cyclooctadiene)(cyclooctenyl).

Many mixed ligand complexes are known: (η^{3}-allyl)Mn(CO)_{4} and CpPd(allyl).

== Synthetic methods ==
A variety of routes, some serendipitous, have been reported.

=== Oxidative addition of allyl halides ===
Allyl complexes are often generated by oxidative addition of allylic halides to low-valent metal complexes. This route is used to prepare (allyl)_{2}Ni_{2}Cl_{2}:

2 Ni(CO)_{4} + 2 ClCH_{2}CH=CH_{2} → Ni_{2}(μ-Cl)_{2}(η^{3}-C_{3}H_{5})_{2} + 8 CO

A similar oxidative addition involves the reaction of allyl bromide to diiron nonacarbonyl. The oxidative addition route has also been used to prepare Mo(II) allyl complexes:

Mo(CO)_{3}(pyridine)_{3} + BrCH_{_{2}}CH=CH_{_{2}} → Mo(CO)_{2}(Br)(C_{3}H_{5})(pyridine)_{2} + pyridine + CO

The oxidative addition route proceeds via complexes with η^{1}-allyl ligands. Also called σ-allyl, it is classified as an X-type ligand. One example is CpFe(CO)_{2}(η^{1}-C_{3}H_{5}), in which only the methylene group is attached to the Fe centre (i.e., it has the connectivity [Fe]–CH_{2}–CH=CH_{2}). Decarbonylation of CpFe(CO)_{2}(η^{1}-C_{3}H_{5}) gives CpFe(CO)(η^{3}-C_{3}H_{5}).

=== From dienes and related compounds ===
η^{4}-Diene ligands are viable precursors to π-allyl complexes. For example, cationic butadiene complexes are susceptible to hydride reduction to give complexes of crotyl (η^{3}-C_{3}H_{4}CH_{3}). Complementarily, anionic diene complexes are known to protonate at carbon to also give crotyl derivatives.

The addition of butadiene to hydrido cobalt tetracarbonyl to give the crotyl complex:

C_{4}H_{6} + HCo(CO)_{4} → (C_{3}H_{4}Me)Co(CO)_{3} + CO

This complex exists as a mixture of syn and anti isomers, depending on the location of the methyl (Me) substituent.

1,3-Dienes such as butadiene and isoprene dimerize in the presence of some metals, giving chelating bis(allyl) complexes. Chelating bis(allyl) complexes are intermediates in the metal-catalyzed dimerization of butadiene to give vinylcyclohexene and cycloocta-1,5-diene. Such complexes also arise from ring-opening of divinylcyclobutane.

Allene is another precursor of allyl complexes.

Reduction of cobalt(II) chloride with sodium in the presence of 1,5-cyclooctadiene gives Co(cyclooctadiene)(cyclooctenyl). In this case one nonconjugated diene serves as a source of a cyclic allyl ligand.

=== From alkenes ===
Hydride abstraction from alkene complexes represents yet another route to π-allyl complexes.

=== Salt metathesis reactions ===
Salt metathesis reactions are important routes to allyl complexes:

2 C_{3}H_{5}MgBr + NiBr_{2} → Ni(C_{3}H_{5})_{2} + 2 MgBr_{2}
3 C_{3}H_{5}MgBr + Co(C_{5}H_{5}O_{2})_{3} → Co(C_{3}H_{5})_{3} + 3 MgBr(C_{5}H_{5}O_{2}) (where C_{5}H_{5}O_{2} is acetylacetonate)

== Benzyl complexes ==
Structure of tetrabenzylzirconium with H atoms omitted for clarity.

Benzyl and allyl ligands often exhibit similar chemical properties. Benzyl ligands commonly adopt either η^{1} or η^{3} bonding modes. The interconversion reactions parallel those of η^{1}- or η^{3}-allyl ligands:

CpFe(CO)_{2}(η^{1}-CH_{2}Ph) → CpFe(CO)(η^{3}-CH_{2}Ph) + CO (Ph = phenyl)

In all bonding modes, the benzylic carbon atom is more strongly attached to the metal as indicated by M-C bond distances, which differ by ca. 0.2 Å in η^{3}-bonded complexes. X-ray crystallography demonstrates that the benzyl ligands in tetrabenzylzirconium are flexible. One polymorph features four η^{2}-benzyl ligands, whereas another polymorph has two η^{1}- and two η^{2}-benzyl ligands.

== Reactions ==
The behavior of π-allyl complexes has attracted considerable attention. The reactivity of the allyl ligand is affected by the ancillary ligands.

Protonolysis can afford free propene:

2 L_{2}Rh(C_{3}H_{5}) + 2 HCl → [L_{2}RhCl]_{2} + 2 CH_{3}CH=CH_{2} (L = phosphine ligand)

== Applications ==
π-Allyl complexes are often discussed in mechanistic organometallic chemistry. For example, allyl-metal-hydride intermediates are often invoked as intermediates in the isomerization of alkene complexes.

Many homogeneous catalysts have been developed from allyl complexes, but few have commercial applications. In the area of organic synthesis, a popular allyl complex is allyl palladium chloride.
