= Bis(cyclooctadiene)nickel(0) =

Names
- Other names nickel biscod, Ni(COD)_{2}

Identifiers
| CAS Number | 1295-35-8 |
| 3D model (JSmol) | Interactive image |
| ChemSpider | 17215769 |
| ECHA InfoCard | 100.013.702 |
| EC Number | 215-072-0 |
| PubChem CID | 6433264 |
| RTECS number | QR6135000 |
| UN number | 1325 |
| CompTox Dashboard (EPA) | DTXSID2024614 |
- InChI: InChI=1S/2C8H8.Ni/c2*1-2-4-6-8-7-5-3-1;/h2*1-2,7-8H2; Key: AYHVBQBQROAZHP-UHFFFAOYSA-N; InChI=1/2C8H8.Ni/c2*1-2-4-6-8-7-5-3-1;/h2*1-2,7-8H2; Key: AYHVBQBQROAZHP-UHFFFAOYAH
- SMILES: C1CC=CCCC=C1.C1CC=CCCC=C1.[Ni]

Properties
| Chemical formula | C_{16}H_{24}Ni |
| Molar mass | 275.06 g/mol |
| Appearance | Yellow solid |
| Melting point | 60 °C (140 °F; 333 K) (N_{2}, decomposes) |
| Solubility | soluble in benzene, tetrahydrofuran, toluene, diethyl ether, dimethylformamide |

Hazards
- GHS labelling
| Pictograms | (GHS02: Flammable) (GHS07: Exclamation mark) (GHS08: Health hazard) |
| Signal word | Danger |
| Hazard statements | H228, H317, H334, H350, H351 |
| Precautionary statements | P201, P202, P210, P240, P241, P261, P272, P280, P281, P285, P302+P352, P304+P341, P308+P313, P321, P333+P313, P342+P311, P363, P370+P378, P405, P501 |
- Except where otherwise noted, data are given for materials in their standard state (at 25 °C [77 °F], 100 kPa). verify (what is ?) Infobox references

Bis(cyclooctadiene)nickel(0) is the organonickel compound with the formula Ni(C_{8}H_{12})_{2}, also written Ni(cod)_{2}. It is a diamagnetic coordination complex featuring tetrahedral nickel(0) bound to the alkene groups in two 1,5-cyclooctadiene ligands. This highly air-sensitive yellow solid is a common source of Ni(0) in chemical synthesis.

== Preparation and properties ==
The complex is prepared by reduction of anhydrous nickel(II) acetylacetonate in the presence of the diolefin:

Ni(acac)_{2} + 2 cod + 2 AlEt_{3} → Ni(cod)_{2} + 2 acacAlEt_{2} + C_{2}H_{6} + C_{2}H_{4}

Ni(cod)_{2} is moderately soluble in several organic solvents.

If exposed to air, the solid oxidizes in a few minutes to nickel(II) oxide. As a result, this compound is generally handled in a glovebox.

== Reactions ==
The reactivity of Ni(cod)_{2} has been extensively examined. One or both 1,5-cyclooctadiene ligands are readily displaced by phosphines, phosphites, bipyridine, and isocyanides.

Oxidation gives the highly reactive monocation, which can be isolated when using weakly coordinating anions:

Ni(cod)_{2} + Ag[Al(OCH(CF_{3})_{2})_{4}] → [Ni(cod)_{2}][Al(OCH(CF_{3})_{2})_{4}] + Ag

Of its many catalytic reactions, Ni(cod)_{2} in the presence of phosphine ligands catalyzes the demethoxylation of anisoles by hydrosilanes:

2 C_{6}H_{5}OCH_{3} + [(CH_{3})_{2}HSi]_{2}O → 2 C_{6}H_{6} + [(CH_{3})_{2}(CH_{3}O)Si]_{2}O
