= Cyclopentadienyl complex =

Coordination complex of a metal and cyclopentadienyl groups

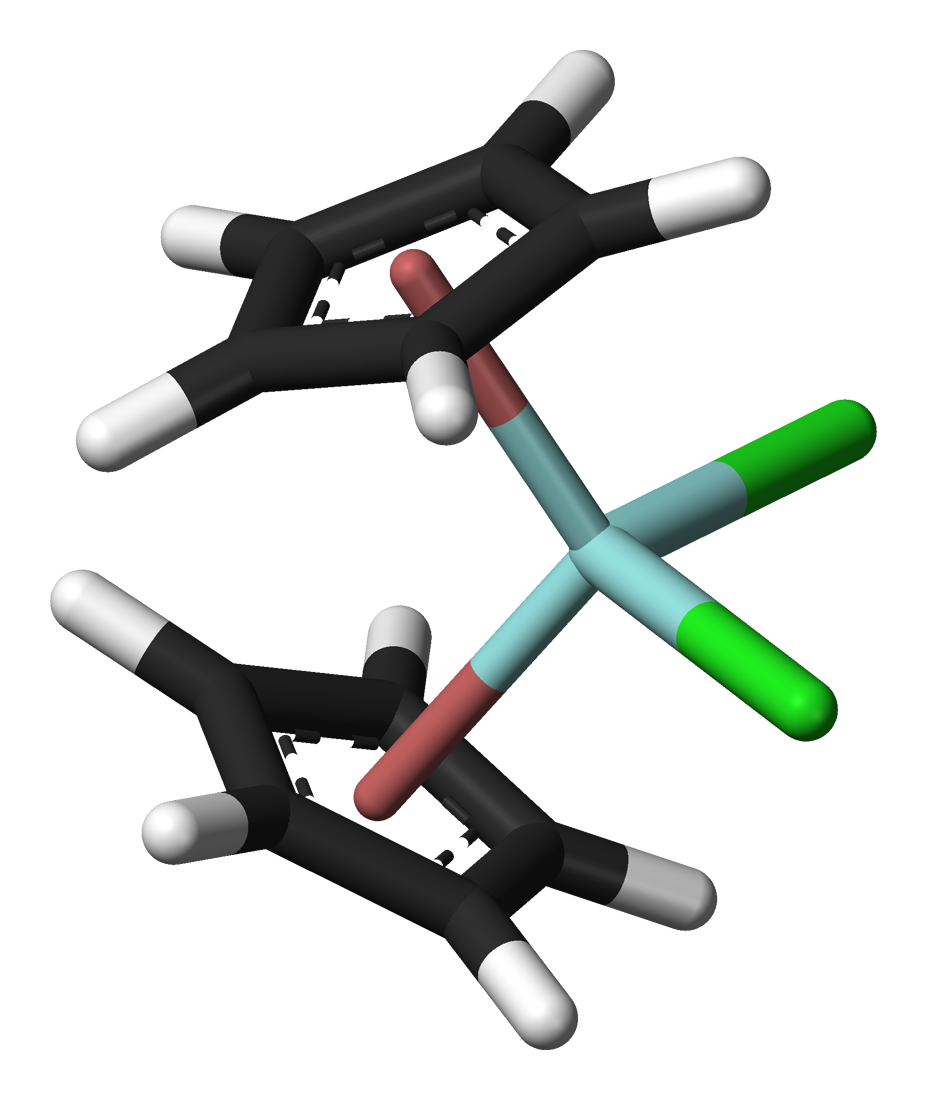
Zirconocene dichloride, a cyclopentadienyl complex

A cyclopentadienyl complex is a coordination complex of a metal and cyclopentadienyl groups (C_{5}H^{−}_{5}, abbreviated as Cp^{−}). Cyclopentadienyl ligands almost invariably bind to metals as a pentahapto (η^{5}-) bonding mode. The metal–cyclopentadienyl interaction is typically drawn as a single line from the metal center to the center of the Cp ring.

== Examples ==
Biscyclopentadienyl complexes are called metallocenes. A famous example of this type of complex is ferrocene (FeCp_{2}), which has many analogues for other metals, such as chromocene (CrCp_{2}), cobaltocene (CoCp_{2}), and nickelocene (NiCp_{2}). When the Cp rings are mutually parallel the compound is known as a sandwich complex. This area of organometallic chemistry was first developed in the 1950s. Bent metallocenes are represented by compounds of the type [MCp_{2}L_{x}]. Some are catalysts for ethylene polymerization. Metallocenes are often thermally stable, and find use as catalysts in various types of reactions.

Mixed-ligand Cp complexes containing Cp ligand and one or more other ligands. They are more numerous. One widely studied example is the Fp dimer, (Cp_{2}Fe_{2}(CO)_{4}). Monometallic compounds featuring only one Cp ring are often known as half sandwich compounds or as piano stool compounds, one example being methylcyclopentadienylmanganese tricarbonyl (CpMn(CO)_{3}).

== Bonding modes ==
In the vast majority of M–Cp complexes, all 5 carbon atoms of a Cp ligand bind the metal (η^{5}-coordination). The M–Cp bonding arises from overlap of the five molecular orbitals in the Cp π system with the metal s, p, and d orbitals; hence these complexes are referred to as π-complexes. Equivalent in an electron counting to η^{5}-Cp anion are three CO ligands as well as scorpionate ligands. The electronic properties of these ligand sets differ significantly. For example, bis(trispyrazolyl)iron(II) is high spin, whereas ferrocene is low spin.

In relatively rare cases, Cp binds to metals via only one carbon center. These types of interactions are described as σ-complexes because they only have a σ bond between the metal and the cyclopentadienyl group. Typical examples of this type of complex are group 14 metal complexes such as CpSiMe_{3}. An example of both is (Cp_{2}Fe(CO)_{2}). It is probable that η^{1}-Cp complexes are intermediates in the formation of η^{5}-Cp complexes.

Still rarer, the Cp unit can bond to the metal via three carbons. In these η^{3}-Cp complexes, the bonding resembles that in allyl ligands. Such complexes, sometimes called "slipped Cp complexes", are invoked as intermediates in ring slipping reactions.

== Synthesis of Cp complexes ==
The compounds are generally prepared by salt metathesis reactions of alkali-metal cyclopentadienyl compounds with transition metal chlorides. Sodium cyclopentadienide (NaCp) and lithium cyclopentadienide are commonly used. Trimethylsilylcyclopentadiene and cyclopentadienylthallium (CpTl) are alternative sources. For the preparation of some particularly robust complexes, e.g. nickelocene, cyclopentadiene is employed in the presence of a conventional base such as KOH. When only a single Cp ligand is installed, the other ligands are typically carbonyl, halogen, alkyl, or hydride.

Most Cp complexes are prepared by substitution of preformed Cp complexes by replacement of halide, CO, and other simple ligands.

== Variations of Cp complexes ==
Variations of Cyclopentadienyl complexes

Decamethylcobaltocene, a powerful reducing agent derived from "Cp*".

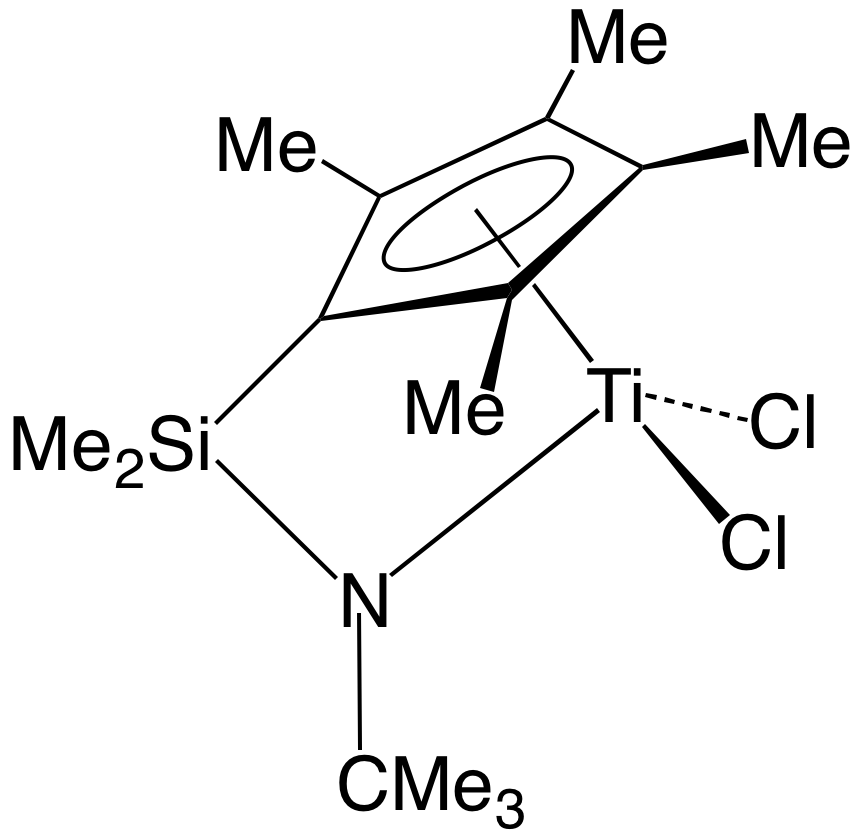
A constrained geometry organotitanium complex

An ansa-metallocene

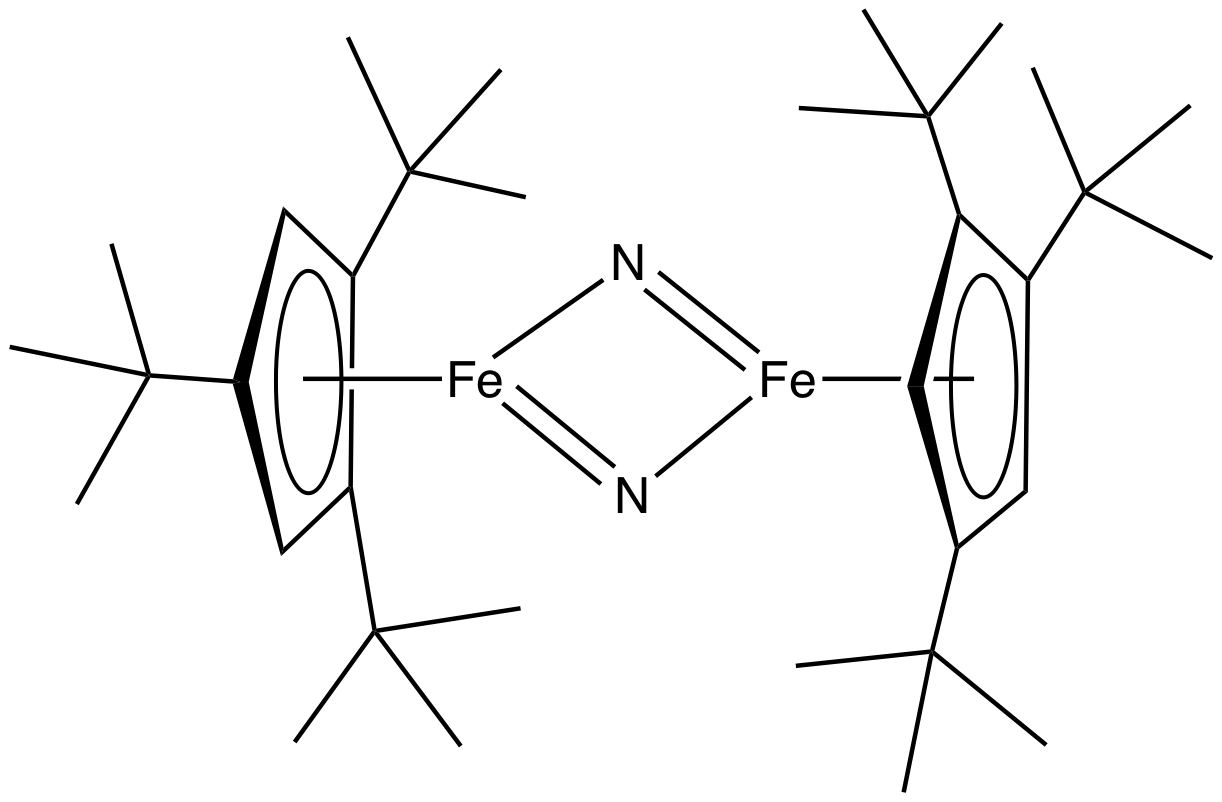
Bulky Cp ligand as found in (^{t}Bu_{3}C_{5}H_{2})_{2}Fe_{2}N_{2}

=== Ansa Cp ligands ===
A pair of cyclopentadienyl ligands can be covalently linked giving rise to so-call ansa metallocenes. The angle between the two Cp rings is fixed. Rotation of the rings about the metal-centroid axis is stopped as well. A related class of derivatives give rise to the constrained geometry complexes. In these cases, a Cp ligand as linked to a non-Cp ligand. Such complexes have been commercialized for the production of polypropylene.

=== Bulky Cp ligands ===
Pentamethylcyclopentadiene gives rise to pentamethylcyclopentadienyl (Cp*) complexes. These ligands are more basic and more lipophilic. Replacing methyl groups with larger substituents results in cyclopentadienes that are so encumbered that pentaalkyl derivatives are no longer possible. Well-studied ligands of this type include C_{5}R_{4}H^{−} (R = iso-Pr) and 1,2,4-C_{5}R_{3}H_{2}^{−} (R = tert-Bu).

=== Constrained geometry complexes ===
Constrained geometry complexes are related to ansa-metallocenes except that one ligand is not Cp-related.

== Applications ==
Cp metal complexes are mainly used as stoichiometric reagents in chemical research. Ferrocenium reagents are oxidants. Cobaltocene is a strong, soluble reductant.

Derivatives of Cp_{2}TiCl_{2} and Cp_{2}ZrCl_{2} are the basis of some reagents in organic synthesis. Upon treatment with aluminoxane, these dihalides give catalysts for olefin polymerization. Such species are called Kaminsky-type catalysts.
