= Ruthenocene =

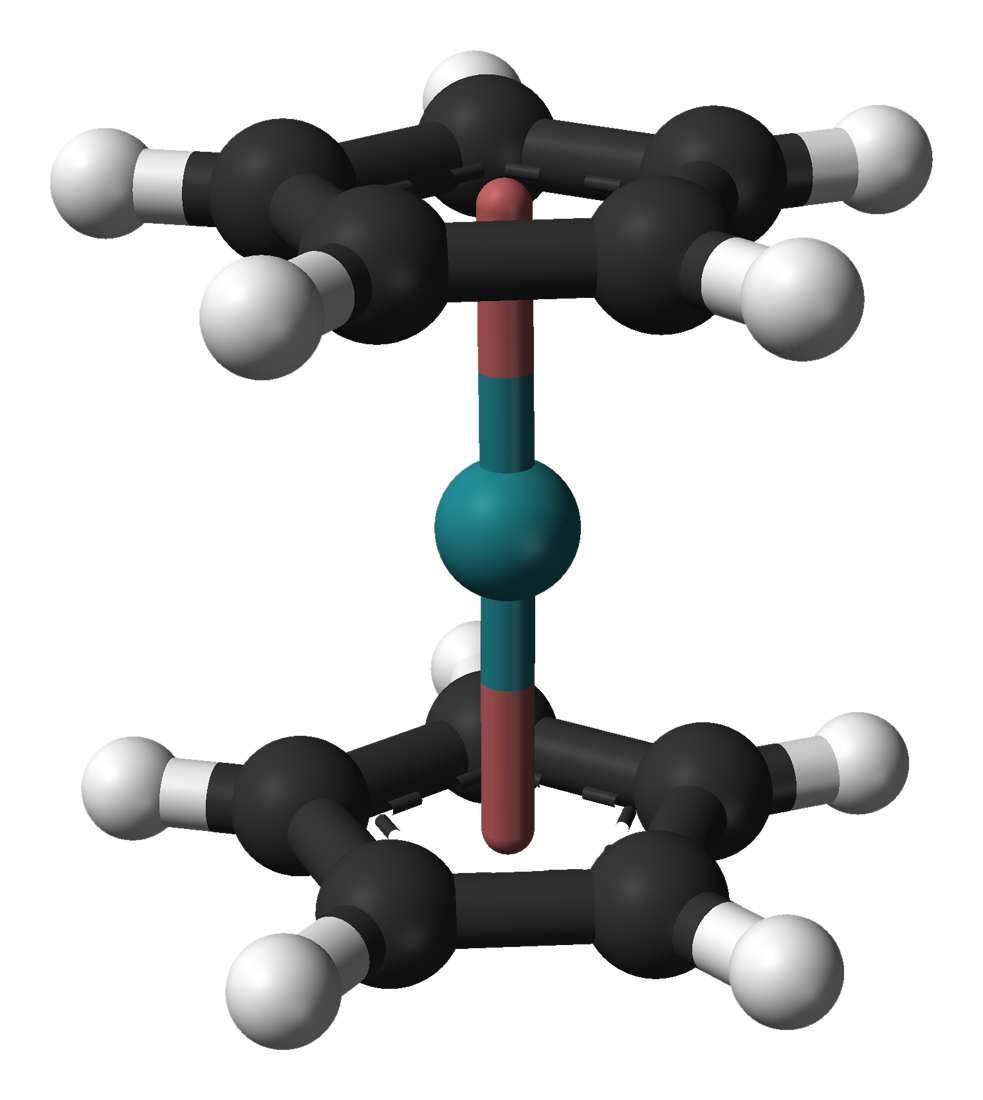

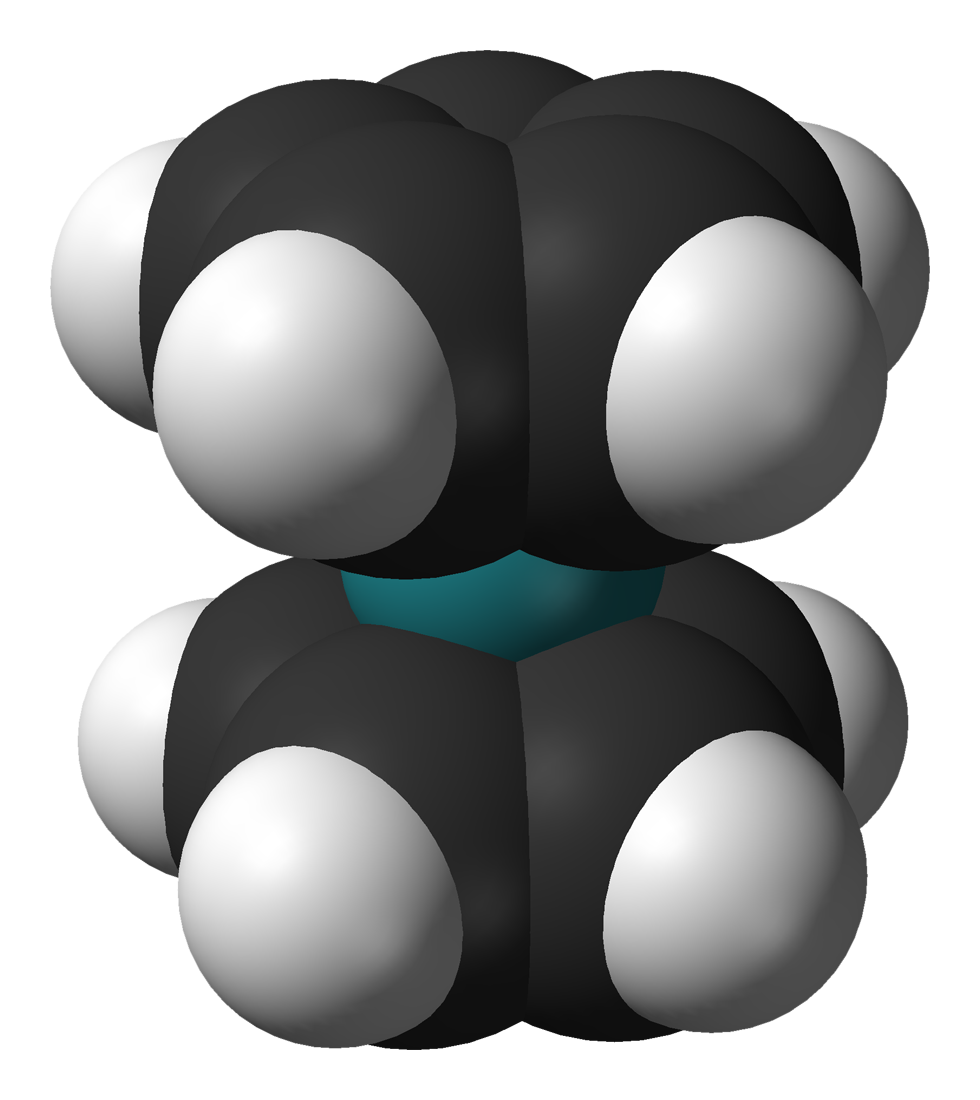

Names
- IUPAC names Ruthenocene; Bis(η^{5}-cyclopentadienyl)ruthenium
- Other names ruthenium cyclopentadienyl, cp_{2}Ru

Identifiers
CAS Number	1287-13-4
3D model (JSmol)	Interactive image
ChEBI	CHEBI:30680
ChemSpider	92229
ECHA InfoCard	100.013.696
EC Number	215-065-2
Gmelin Reference	3469
PubChem CID	11986121
CompTox Dashboard (EPA)	DTXSID90903950
- InChI: InChI=1S/2C5H5.Ru/c2*1-2-4-5-3-1;/h2*1-5H;/q-5;-1; Key: KRRYFXOQIMANBV-UHFFFAOYSA-N
- SMILES: [cH-]1cccc1.[cH-]1cccc1.[Ru+2]

Properties
Chemical formula	C_{10}H_{10}Ru
Molar mass	231.26 g/mol
Appearance	pale yellow powder
Density	1.86 g/cm^{3} (25 °C)
Melting point	195 to 200 °C (383 to 392 °F; 468 to 473 K)
Boiling point	278 °C (532 °F; 551 K)
Solubility in water	Insoluble in water, soluble in most organic solvents

Hazards
- GHS labelling
Pictograms	(GHS07: Exclamation mark)
Signal word	Warning
Hazard statements	H315, H319, H335
NFPA 704 (fire diamond)	2 0 0

Related compounds
Related compounds	cobaltocene, nickelocene, chromocene, ferrocene, osmocene, bis(benzene)chromium
- Except where otherwise noted, data are given for materials in their standard state (at 25 °C [77 °F], 100 kPa). verify (what is ?) Infobox references

Ruthenocene is an organoruthenium compound with the formula (C_{5}H_{5})_{2}Ru. This pale yellow, volatile solid is classified as a sandwich compound and more specifically, as a metallocene.

== Structure and bonding ==
Ruthenocene consists of a ruthenium ion sandwiched in between two cyclopentadienyl rings. It features ruthenium centre bound symmetrically to the planes of two cyclopentadienyl rings. It is closely related to the isoelectronic ferrocene.

In contrast to ferrocene, wherein the cyclopentadienyl rings are in a staggered conformation, those of ruthenocene crystallise with an eclipsed conformation. This difference is due to the larger ionic radius of ruthenium, which increases the distance between the cyclopentadienyl rings, decreasing steric interactions and allowing an eclipsed conformation to prevail. In solution, these rings rotate with a very low barrier.

== Preparation ==
Ruthenocene was first synthesized in 1952 by Geoffrey Wilkinson, a Nobel laureate who had collaborated in assigning the structure of ferrocene only a year earlier. Originally, ruthenocene was prepared by the reaction of ruthenium trisacetylacetonate with excess of cyclopentadienylmagnesium bromide.

Ru(acac)_{3} + C_{5}H_{5}MgBr → Ru(C_{5}H_{5})_{2} + 3 "acacMgBr" + "C_{5}H_{5}"

Ruthenocene may also be prepared by the reaction of sodium cyclopentadienide with "ruthenium dichloride" prepared in situ by reduction of ruthenium trichloride.

== Chemical properties ==
Ruthenocene typically oxidises via two electron change, instead of one. With weakly coordinating anions as electrolyte, the oxidation proceeds via a 1e step.

Ruthenocene has been investigated as a photoinitiator for polymerization reactions.
