= Trimethylsilyl cyclopentadiene =

Names
- IUPAC name cyclopenta-2,4-dien-1-yl(trimethyl)silane

Identifiers
CAS Number	3559-74-8
3D model (JSmol)	Interactive image
ChemSpider	82435
PubChem CID	91288
- InChI: InChI=1S/C8H14Si/c1-9(2,3)8-6-4-5-7-8/h4-8H,1-3H3 Key: VMFHCJPMKUTMMQ-UHFFFAOYSA-N
- SMILES: C[Si](C)(C)C1C=CC=C1

Properties
Chemical formula	C_{8}H_{14}Si
Molar mass	138.285 g·mol^{−1}
Appearance	Colorless liquid
Density	0.833 g/mL
Boiling point	138 to 140 °C (280 to 284 °F; 411 to 413 K)

Hazards
- GHS labelling
Pictograms	(GHS02: Flammable) (GHS07: Exclamation mark)
Signal word	Warning
Hazard statements	H226, H315, H319, H335
Precautionary statements	P210, P233, P240, P241, P242, P243, P261, P264, P271, P280, P302+P352, P303+P361+P353, P304+P340, P305+P351+P338, P312, P321, P332+P313, P337+P313, P362, P370+P378, P403+P233, P403+P235, P405, P501
- Except where otherwise noted, data are given for materials in their standard state (at 25 °C [77 °F], 100 kPa). Infobox references

Trimethylsilyl cyclopentadiene is an organosilicon compound with the chemical formula C_{5}H_{5}Si(CH_{3})_{3}. It exists as a colorless liquid. It is used in the synthesis of some metal cyclopentadienyl complexes and has attracted interest for its fluxional structure.

Trimethylsilyl cyclopentadiene is an example of a molecule that undergoes rapid sigmatropic rearrangement. Observations of trimethylsilyl cyclopentadiene using gas phase NMR spectroscopy show that the protons on the ring are chemically equivalent, indicated by a single peak. This phenomenon, an example of fluxionality, is explained by the migration of the silyl group from carbon-to-carbon, thereby giving the appearance of equivalent CH signals.

It has a refractive index (n20/D) of 1.471.

== Synthesis ==
Trimethylsilyl cyclopentadiene is prepared by the reaction trimethylsilyl chloride (Me_{3}SiCl) with sodium cyclopentadienide (NaC_{5}H_{5}):

(CH_{3})_{3}SiCl + NaC_{5}H_{5} → C_{5}H_{5}Si(CH_{3})_{3} + NaCl
