= Lithium cyclopentadienide =

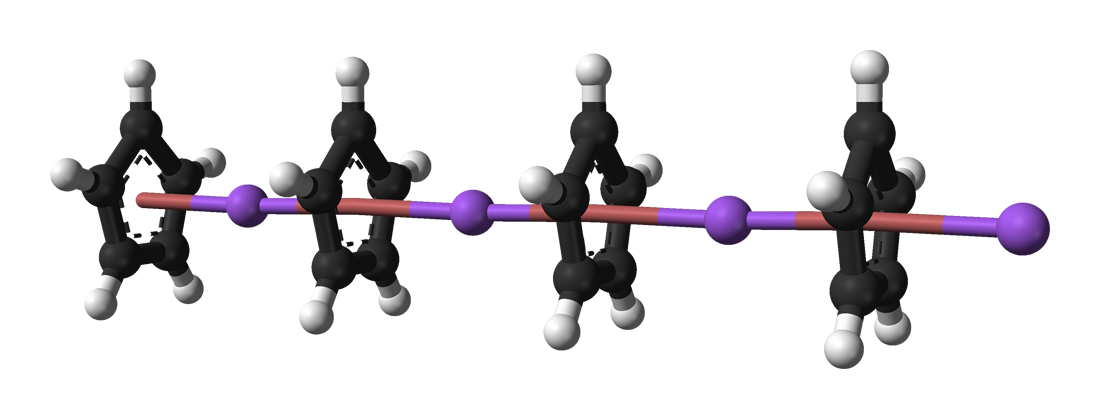

Names
- Other names lithium cyclopentadienylide, cyclopentadienyllithium, LiCp

Identifiers
| CAS Number | 16733-97-4 |
| 3D model (JSmol) | Interactive image |
| ECHA InfoCard | 100.156.001 |
| EC Number | 627-659-2 |
| PubChem CID | 14063469 |
| CompTox Dashboard (EPA) | DTXSID40555241 |
- InChI: InChI=1S/C5H5.Li/c1-2-4-5-3-1;/h1-3H,4H2;/q-1;+1 Key: CSOHRTAOCDVTQU-UHFFFAOYSA-N
- SMILES: [Li+].C1C=CC=[C-]1

Properties
| Chemical formula | C_{5}H_{5}Li |
| Molar mass | 72.04 g·mol^{−1} |
| Appearance | colorless solid |
| Density | 1.064 g/cm^{3} |
| Solubility in water | decomposition |
| Solubility | THF, dimethoxyethane |
- Except where otherwise noted, data are given for materials in their standard state (at 25 °C [77 °F], 100 kPa). verify (what is ?) Infobox references

Lithium cyclopentadienide is an organolithium compound with the formula C_{5}H_{5}Li. The compound is often abbreviated as LiCp, where Cp^{−} is the cyclopentadienide anion. Lithium cyclopentadienide is a colorless solid, although samples often are pink owing to traces of oxidized impurities.

== Preparation, structure and reactions ==
Lithium cyclopentadienide is commercially available as a solution in tetrahydrofuran. It is prepared by treating cyclopentadiene with butyllithium:

C_{5}H_{6} + LiC_{4}H_{9} → LiC_{5}H_{5} + C_{4}H_{10}

Because lithium cyclopentadienide is usually handled as a solution, the solvent-free solid is rarely encountered. According to X-ray crystallography, LiCp is a "polydecker" sandwich complex, consisting of an infinite chain of alternating Li^{+} centers sandwiched between μ-η^{5}:η^{5}-C_{5}H_{5} ligands. In the presence of amines or ethers, LiCp gives adducts, e.g. (η^{5}-Cp)Li(TMEDA). LiCp is a common reagent for the preparation of cyclopentadienyl complexes.

== See also ==
- Sodium cyclopentadienide
