= Cobaltocene =

Skeletal formula of cobaltocene
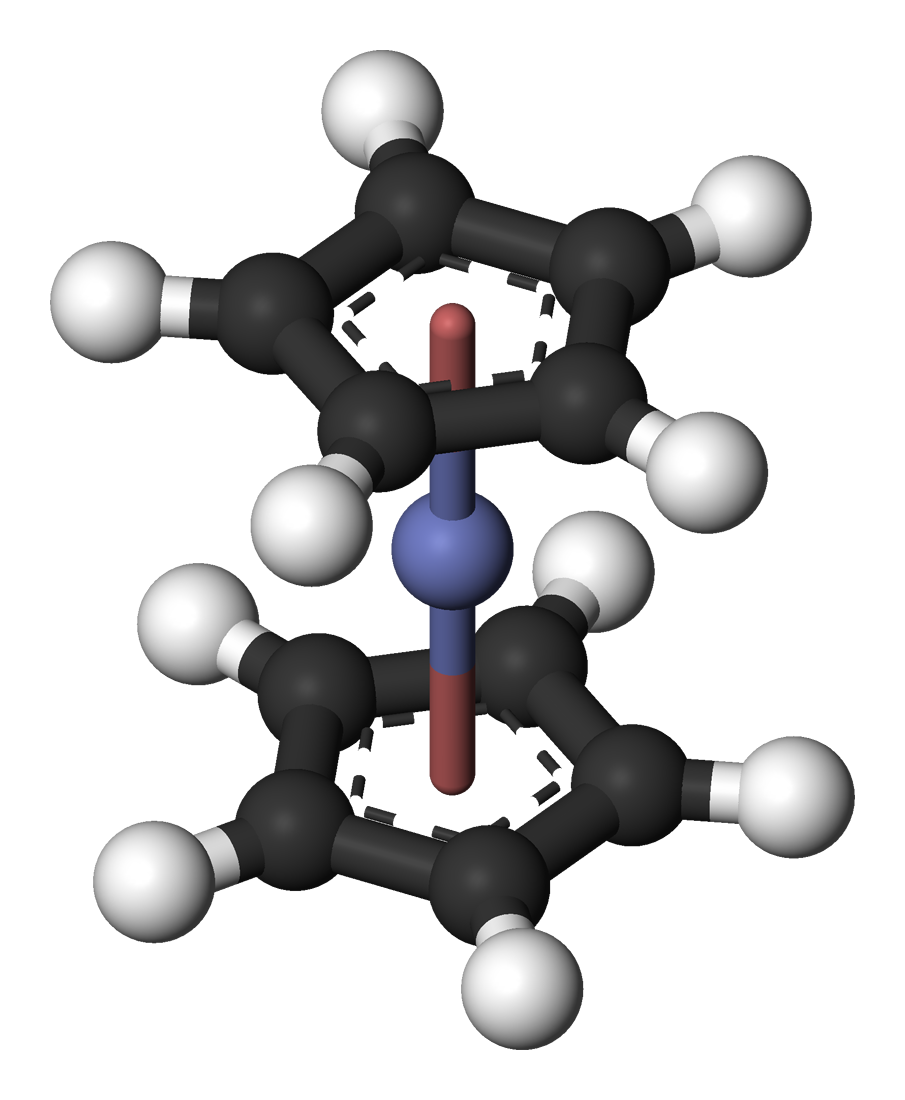
Ball-and-stick model of cobaltocene

Names
- IUPAC names Cobaltocene; Bis(η^{5}-cyclopentadienyl)cobalt
- Other names Cp_{2}Co

Identifiers
CAS Number	1277-43-6
3D model (JSmol)	Interactive image
ChEBI	CHEBI:30678
ChemSpider	83848
ECHA InfoCard	100.013.692
EC Number	215-061-0
PubChem CID	22045960
RTECS number	GG0350000
UNII	4W7LGU89CV
CompTox Dashboard (EPA)	DTXSID0024840
- InChI: InChI=1S/2C5H5.Co/c2*1-2-4-5-3-1;/h2*1-5H;/q2*-1;+2 Key: ILZSSCVGGYJLOG-UHFFFAOYSA-N; InChI=1/2C5H5.Co/c2*1-2-4-5-3-1;/h2*1-5H;/q2*-1;+2 Key: ILZSSCVGGYJLOG-UHFFFAOYAM
- SMILES: [cH-]1cccc1.[cH-]1cccc1.[Co+2]

Properties
Chemical formula	[Co(η^{5}-C_{5}H_{5})_{2}]
Molar mass	189.12 g/mol
Appearance	Dark purple solid
Melting point	171–173 °C (340–343 °F; 444–446 K)
Solubility in water	Insoluble

Structure
Coordination geometry	sandwich
Dipole moment	zero

Thermochemistry
Std molar entropy (S^{⦵}_{298})	236 J K^{−1} mol^{−1}
Std enthalpy of formation (Δ_{f}H^{⦵}_{298})	+237 kJ/mol (uncertain)
Std enthalpy of combustion (Δ_{c}H^{⦵}_{298})	−5839 kJ/mol

Hazards
- GHS labelling
Pictograms	(GHS02: Flammable) (GHS08: Health hazard)
Signal word	Danger
Hazard statements	H228, H317, H334, H341, H351
Precautionary statements	P210, P261, P280, P363, P405, P501
NFPA 704 (fire diamond)	1 2 0

Related compounds
Related metallocenes	Ferrocene; Nickelocene; Rhodocene; Decamethylcobaltocene
- Except where otherwise noted, data are given for materials in their standard state (at 25 °C [77 °F], 100 kPa). verify (what is ?) Infobox references

Cobaltocene, known also as bis(cyclopentadienyl)cobalt(II) or even "bis Cp cobalt", is an organocobalt compound with the formula Co(C_{5}H_{5})_{2}. It is a dark purple solid that sublimes readily slightly above room temperature. Cobaltocene was discovered shortly after ferrocene, the first metallocene. Due to the ease with which it reacts with oxygen, the compound must be handled and stored using air-free techniques.

== Synthesis ==
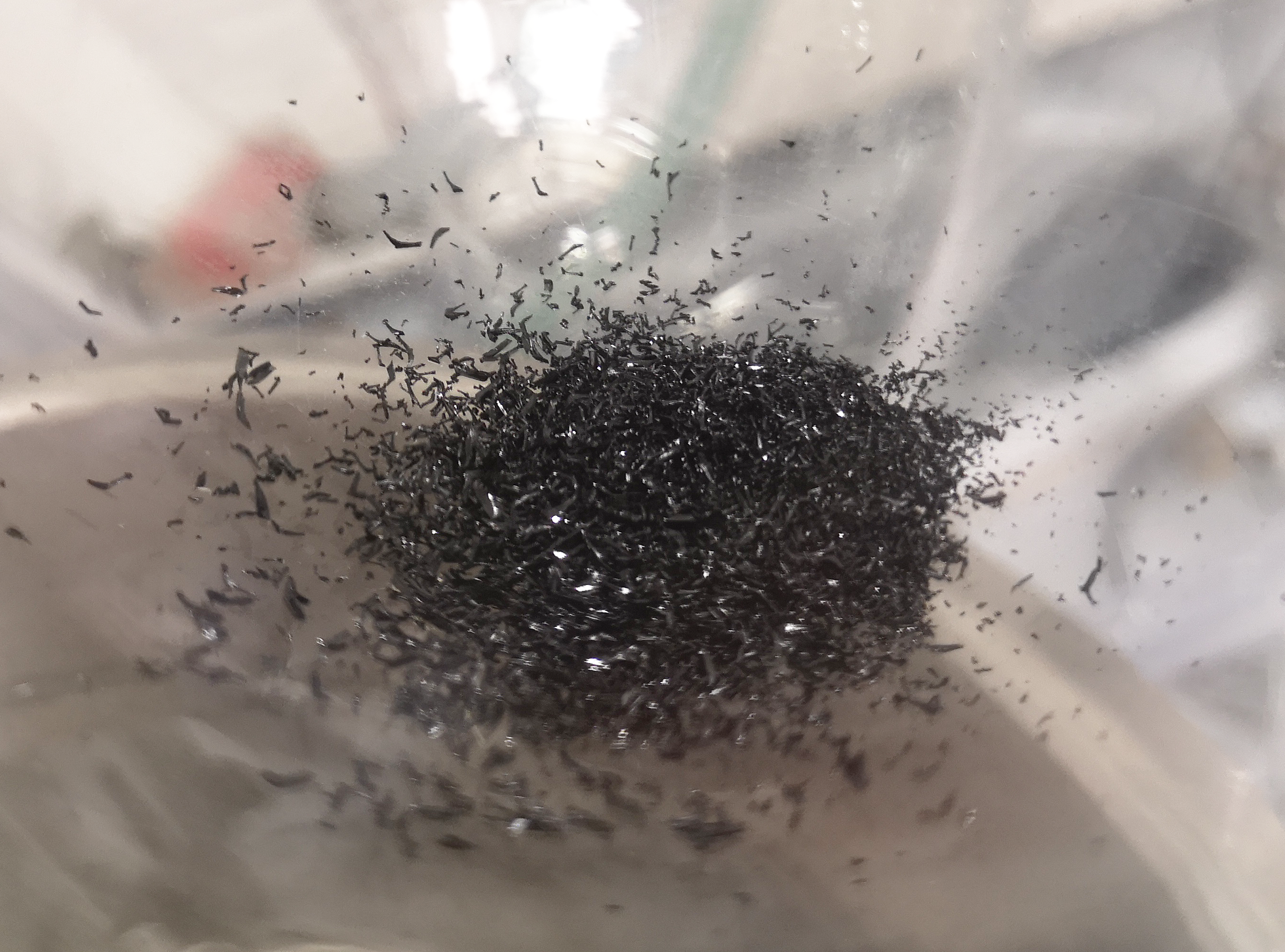
Vacuum sublimated cobaltocene under nitrogen atmosphere

Cobaltocene is prepared by the reaction of sodium cyclopentadienide (NaC_{5}H_{5}) with anhydrous cobalt(II) chloride in THF solution. Sodium chloride is cogenerated, and the organometallic product is usually purified by vacuum sublimation.

== Structure and bonding ==
In Co(C_{5}H_{5})_{2} the Co centre is "sandwiched" between two cyclopentadienyl (Cp) rings. The Co–C bond lengths are about 2.1 Å, slightly longer than the Fe–C bond in ferrocene.

Co(C_{5}H_{5})_{2} belongs to a group of organometallic compounds called metallocenes or sandwich compounds. Cobaltocene has 19 valence electrons, one more than usually found in organotransition metal complexes such as its very stable relative ferrocene. (See 18-electron rule.) This additional electron occupies an orbital that is antibonding with respect to the Co–C bonds. Consequently, the Co–C distances are slightly longer than the Fe–C bonds in ferrocene. Many chemical reactions of Co(C_{5}H_{5})_{2} are characterized by its tendency to lose this "extra" electron, yielding an 18-electron cation known as cobaltocenium:

$$\ce{\underbrace{2Co(C5H5)2}_{19e-}
+ I2
->
\underbrace{2Co(C5H5)2+}_{18e-}
+ 2I-}$$

The otherwise close relative of cobaltocene, rhodocene does not exist as a monomer, but spontaneously dimerizes by formation of a C–C bond between Cp rings.

== Reactions ==
=== Redox properties ===
Co(C_{5}H_{5})_{2} is a common one-electron reducing agent in the laboratory. In fact, the reversibility of the Co(C_{5}H_{5})_{2} redox couple is so well-behaved that Co(C_{5}H_{5})_{2} may be used in cyclic voltammetry as an internal standard. Its permethylated analogue decamethylcobaltocene (Co(C_{5}Me_{5})_{2}) is an especially powerful reducing agent, due to inductive donation of electron density from the 10 methyl groups, prompting the cobalt to even more give up its "extra" electron. These two compounds are rare examples of reductants that dissolve in non-polar organic solvents. The reduction potentials of these compounds follow, using the ferrocene-ferrocenium couple as the reference:

Half-reaction	E^{0} (V)
Fe(C_{5}H_{5})^{+}_{2} + e^{−} ⇌ Fe(C_{5}H_{5})_{2}	0.00 (by definition)
Fe(C_{5}Me_{5})^{+}_{2} + e^{−} ⇌ Fe(C_{5}Me_{5})_{2}	−0.59
Co(C_{5}H_{5})^{+}_{2} + e^{−} ⇌ Co(C_{5}H_{5})_{2}	−1.33
Co(C_{5}Me_{5})^{+}_{2} + e^{−} ⇌ Co(C_{5}Me_{5})_{2}	−1.94

The data show that the decamethyl compounds are around 600 mV more reducing than the parent metallocenes. This substituent effect is, however, overshadowed by the influence of the metal: changing from Fe to Co renders the reduction more favorable by over 1.3 volts.

=== Carbonylation ===
Treatment of Co(C_{5}H_{5})_{2} with carbon monoxide gives the cobalt(I) derivative Co(C_{5}H_{5})(CO)_{2}, concomitant with loss of one Cp ligand. This conversion is conducted near 130 °C with 500 psi of CO.

== See also ==
- Rhodocene
