= Constrained geometry complex =

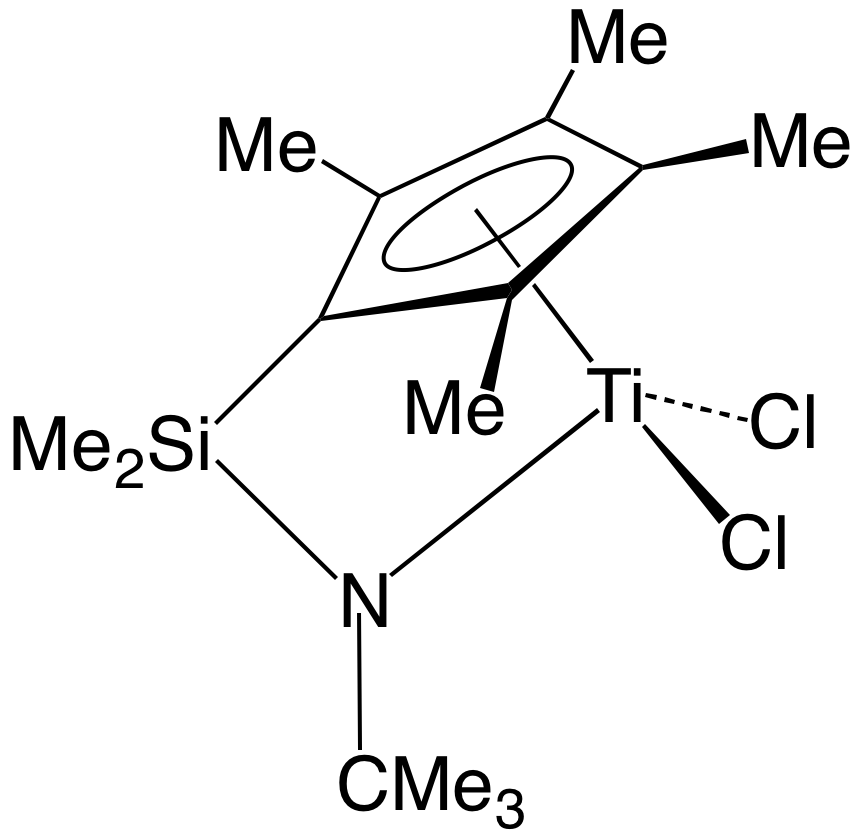
A constrained geometry organotitanium complex in the (inactive) chloride form.

In organometallic chemistry, a "constrained geometry complex" (CGC) is a kind of catalyst used for the production of polyolefins such as polyethylene and polypropylene. The catalyst was one of the first major departures from metallocene-based catalysts and ushered in much innovation in the development of new plastics.

== Structure ==
CGC complexes feature a pi-bonded moiety (e.g. cyclopentadienyl) linked to one of the other ligands on the same metal centre in such a way that the angle at this metal between the centroid of the pi-system and the additional ligand is smaller than in comparable unbridged complexes. More specifically, the term CGC was used for ansa-bridged cyclopentadienyl amido complexes, although the definition goes far beyond this class of compounds. The term CGC is frequently used in connection with other more or less related ligand systems that may or may not be isolobal and/or isoelectronic with the ansa-bridged cyclopentadienyl amido ligand system. Furthermore, the term is frequently used for related complexes with long ansa-bridges that induce no strain. Ansa-bridged cyclopentadienyl amido complexes are known for the Group 3, 4, 5, 6 and some Group 8 metals, with the Group 4 congeners being the most studied ones.

== Applications ==
Like Group 4 metallocenes, suitable Group 4 CGCs may be activated for the polymerisation of ethylene and alpha-olefins by reaction with co-catalysts, e.g. methylaluminoxane (MAO), tris(pentafluorophenyl)boranes, and trityl borates. The catalytic systems based on CGCs, however, display incorporation of alpha-olefin comonomers to a greater extend than comparable metallocene based systems. This superiority of CGCs in copolymerisation reactions is ascribed to; (i) a high accessibility of the reactive centre, (ii) a low tendency of the bulk polymer chain to undergo chain transfer reactions. CGC derived polymers are currently marketed by The Dow Chemical Company as part of their INSITE technology.

Beyond the use of CGCs for polymerisation reactions, a number of other transformations catalysed by CGCs (both of Group 3 and 4 metals) have been reported from academic laboratories. These include the application of CGCs as catalysts for hydrogenation of imines, hydroboration of alkenes, carboalumination of alkenes, hydrosilylation of alkenes, hydroamination/cyclisation of alpha, omega-aminoalkenes and dimerisation of terminal alkynes.

== History ==
The first CGC was reported by Shapiro and Bercaw for a scandium complex. The following year patents were issued to The Dow Chemical Company and Exxon for applications in alkene polymerization. and today are made at the billion pound scale.
