= Decamethylcobaltocene =

Names
- IUPAC name Bis(η5-pentamethylcyclopentadienyl)cobalt(II)
- Other names bis(η5- pentamethylcyclopentadienyl)cobalt

Identifiers
CAS Number	74507-62-3
3D model (JSmol)	Interactive image
ChemSpider	4321575
PubChem CID	5148110
CompTox Dashboard (EPA)	DTXSID80996013
- InChI: InChI=1S/2C10H15.Co/c2*1-6-7(2)9(4)10(5)8(6)3;/h2*1-5H3;/q2*-1;+2 Key: NGJVBICXQZVNEF-UHFFFAOYSA-N; InChI=1/2C10H15.Co/c2*1-6-7(2)9(4)10(5)8(6)3;/h2*1-5H3;/q2*-1;+2 Key: NGJVBICXQZVNEF-UHFFFAOYAU
- SMILES: C[c-]1c(c(c(c1C)C)C)C.C[c-]1c(c(c(c1C)C)C)C.[Co+2]

Properties
Chemical formula	C_{20}H_{30}Co
Molar mass	329.393 g·mol^{−1}
Appearance	dark brown
Melting point	> 210 °C (410 °F; 483 K)
- Except where otherwise noted, data are given for materials in their standard state (at 25 °C [77 °F], 100 kPa). verify (what is ?) Infobox references

Decamethylcobaltocene is an organocobalt compound with the formula Co(C_{5}(CH_{3})_{5})_{2}, abbreviated CoCp^{∗}_{2}. It is a dark brown solid. This compound is used as a strong reducing agent in organometallic chemistry.

== Synthesis ==
Decamethylcobaltocene is prepared by treatment of LiCp* with CoCl_{2}:

2 LiCp* + CoCl_{2} → 2 LiCl + CoCp*_{2}

The permethylated form is more air-sensitive than the parent cobaltocene, owing to the inductive effects of methyl groups. It is a thermally stable compound and undergoes vacuum sublimation.

== Bonding ==
Co(C_{5}Me_{5})_{2} is a metallocene, having idealized D_{5d} symmetry. Like cobaltocene, decamethylcobaltocene has a 19 electron count in its valence shell and is paramagnetic.

It is used as a one-electron reducing agent. Relative to the ferrocene/ferrocenium couple, the redox potential for the [CoCp*_{2}]^{+/0} couple is -1.94 V compared to the [CoCp_{2}]^{+/0} couple of -1.33 V (in dichloromethane). For comparison, the difference between the redox ferrocene and its permethylated derivative FeCp*_{2}^{+/0} couple is -0.59 V (also in dichloromethane).

== Structure ==
Decamethylcobaltocene and decamethylferrocene have very similar structures. The additional electron occupies an orbital that is anti-bonding with respect to the Co-C bonds. Co-C distances of 2.118 Å at room temperature are slightly longer than seen in other metallocenes such as the Fe-C bonds in ferrocene, and fairly longer than its parent cobaltocene at 2.096 Å at room temperature (in the gas-phase, the Co-C distances in Cp_{2}Co is 2.119 Å, closely resembling the Co-C bond lengths of decamethylcobaltocene.

An illustrative redox reaction of decamethylcobaltocene is:

2 CoCp*_{2} + C_{60} → 2 [CoCp*_{2}]^{+} + [C_{60}]^{2−}
