= Aluminoxane =

Octa-aluminoxane (R = tert-Bu).

Aluminoxanes are organoaluminium compounds with the formula [RAlO]_{m}[R_{2}AlO_{0.5}]_{n}[R_{2}AlOH]_{o}, where R is an organic substituent. The following structural rules apply: Al is tetrahedral and O is three-coordinate.

Methylaluminoxane is widely used in the polymerization of alkenes. These compounds are typically obtained by the partial hydrolysis of trialkylaluminium compounds. Aluminoxanes serve as activators for catalytic olefin polymerisation, such as the Ziegler–Natta catalyst. They also serve a function as scavenger for impurities (e.g. water) in reactions that are sensitive to these impurities. Aluminoxane, appearing as white solids, are encountered as solutions.

Aluminoxane with OH groups (R = tert-Bu).
