= Cyclopentadiene =

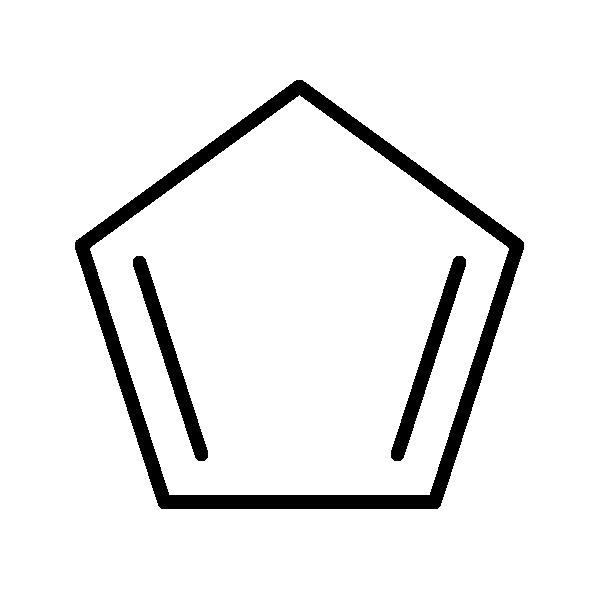
Skeletal formula of cyclopentadiene
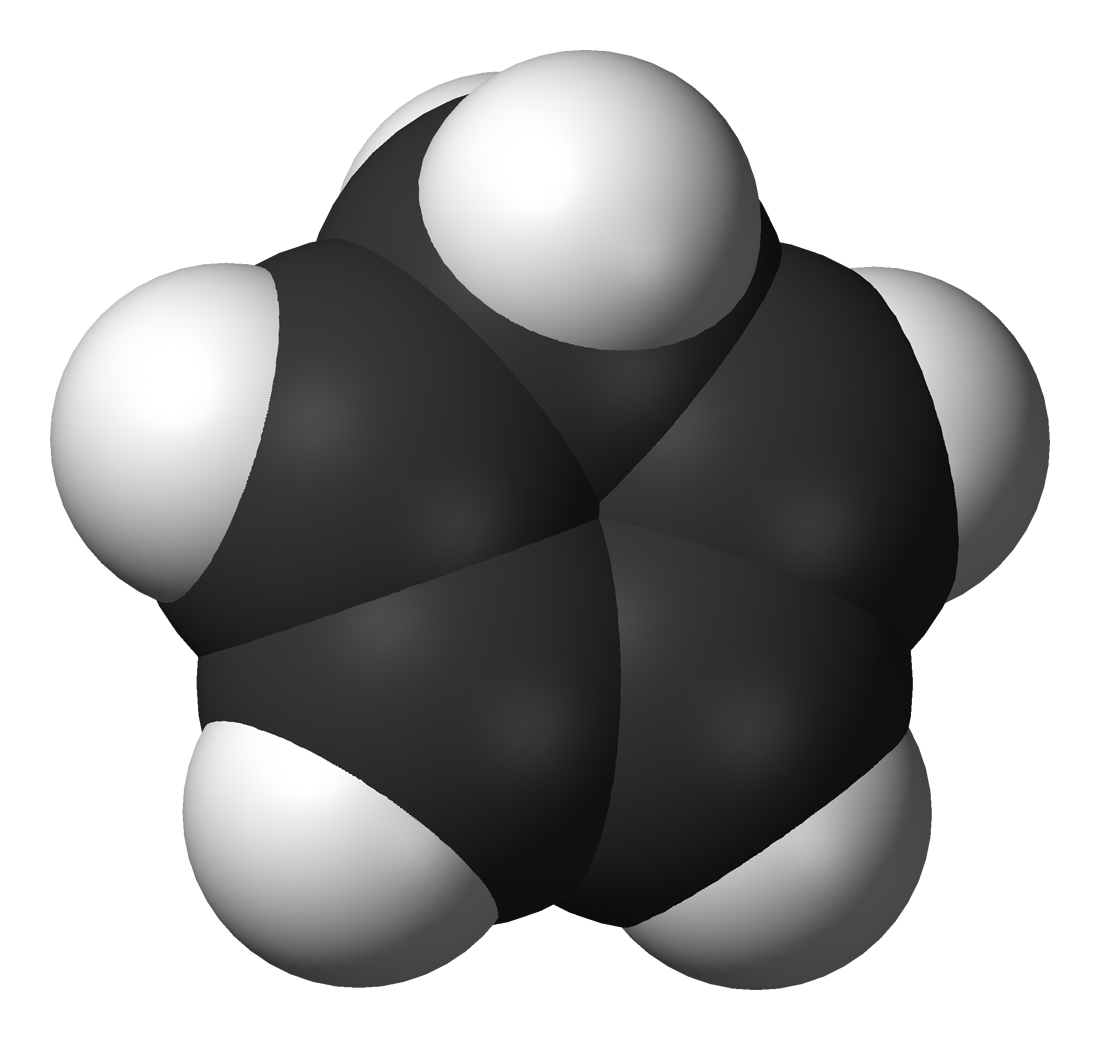
Spacefill model of cyclopentadiene
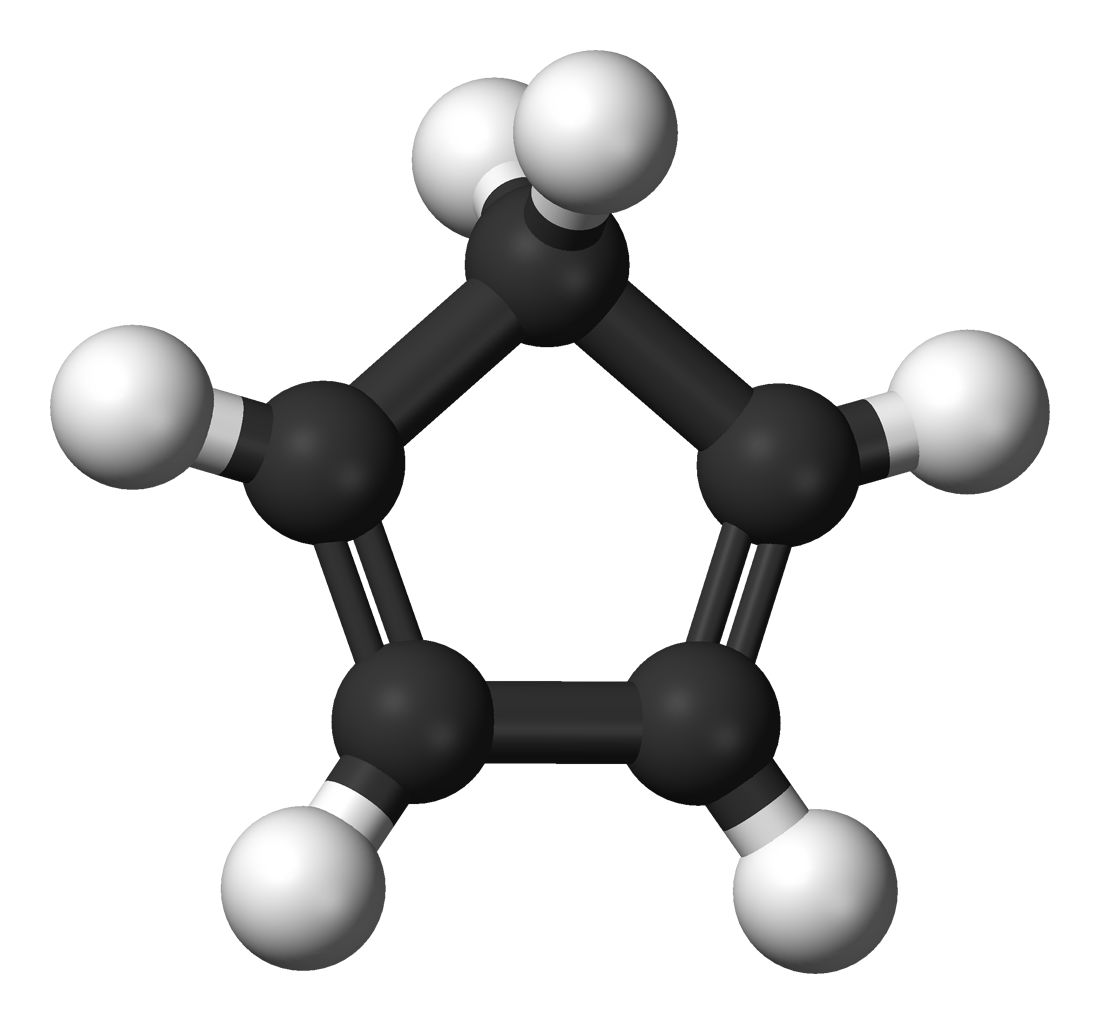
- Ball and stick model of cyclopentadiene

Names
- Preferred IUPAC name Cyclopenta-1,3-diene
- Other names 1,3-Cyclopentadiene; Pyropentylene

Identifiers
CAS Number	542-92-7
3D model (JSmol)	Interactive image
Abbreviations	CPD, HCp
Beilstein Reference	471171
ChEBI	CHEBI:30664
ChemSpider	7330
ECHA InfoCard	100.008.033
EC Number	208-835-4
Gmelin Reference	1311
MeSH	1,3-cyclopentadiene
PubChem CID	7612
RTECS number	GY1000000
UNII	5DFH9434HF
CompTox Dashboard (EPA)	DTXSID0027191
- InChI: InChI=1S/C5H6/c1-2-4-5-3-1/h1-4H,5H2 Key: ZSWFCLXCOIISFI-UHFFFAOYSA-N; InChI=1/C5H6/c1-2-4-5-3-1/h1-4H,5H2 Key: ZSWFCLXCOIISFI-UHFFFAOYAI
- SMILES: C1C=CC=C1

Properties
Chemical formula	C_{5}H_{6}
Molar mass	66.103 g·mol^{−1}
Appearance	Colourless liquid
Odor	irritating, terpene-like
Density	0.802 g/cm^{3}
Melting point	−90 °C; −130 °F; 183 K
Boiling point	39 to 43 °C; 102 to 109 °F; 312 to 316 K
Solubility in water	insoluble
Vapor pressure	400 mmHg (53 kPa)
Acidity (pK_{a})	16
Conjugate base	Cyclopentadienyl anion
Magnetic susceptibility (χ)	−44.5×10^{−6} cm^{3}/mol
Refractive index (n_{D})	1.44 (at 20 °C)

Structure
Molecular shape	Planar
Dipole moment	0.419 D

Thermochemistry
Heat capacity (C)	115.3 J/(mol·K)
Std molar entropy (S^{⦵}_{298})	182.7 J/(mol·K)
Std enthalpy of formation (Δ_{f}H^{⦵}_{298})	105.9 kJ/mol

Hazards
NFPA 704 (fire diamond)	2 3 0
Flash point	25 °C (77 °F; 298 K)
Autoignition temperature	640 °C (1,184 °F; 913 K)
- Lethal dose or concentration (LD, LC)
LC_{50} (median concentration)	14,182 ppm (rat, 2 h); 5091 ppm (mouse, 2 h)
- NIOSH (US health exposure limits)
PEL (Permissible)	TWA 75 ppm (200 mg/m^{3})
REL (Recommended)	TWA 75 ppm (200 mg/m^{3})
IDLH (Immediate danger)	750 ppm

Related compounds
Related hydrocarbons	Benzene; Cyclobutadiene; Cyclopentene
Related compounds	Dicyclopentadiene
- Except where otherwise noted, data are given for materials in their standard state (at 25 °C [77 °F], 100 kPa). verify (what is ?) Infobox references

Cyclopentadiene is an organic compound with the formula C_{5}H_{6}. It is often abbreviated CpH because the cyclopentadienyl anion is abbreviated Cp^{−}.

This colorless liquid has a strong and unpleasant odor. At room temperature, this cyclic diene dimerizes over the course of hours to give dicyclopentadiene via a Diels–Alder reaction. This dimer can be heated to induce thermal cracking and regenerate the monomer through a retro-Diels–Alder reaction

The compound is mainly used for the production of cyclopentene and its derivatives. It is popularly used as a precursor to the cyclopentadienyl anion (Cp^{−}), an important ligand in cyclopentadienyl complexes in organometallic chemistry.

== Production and reactions ==
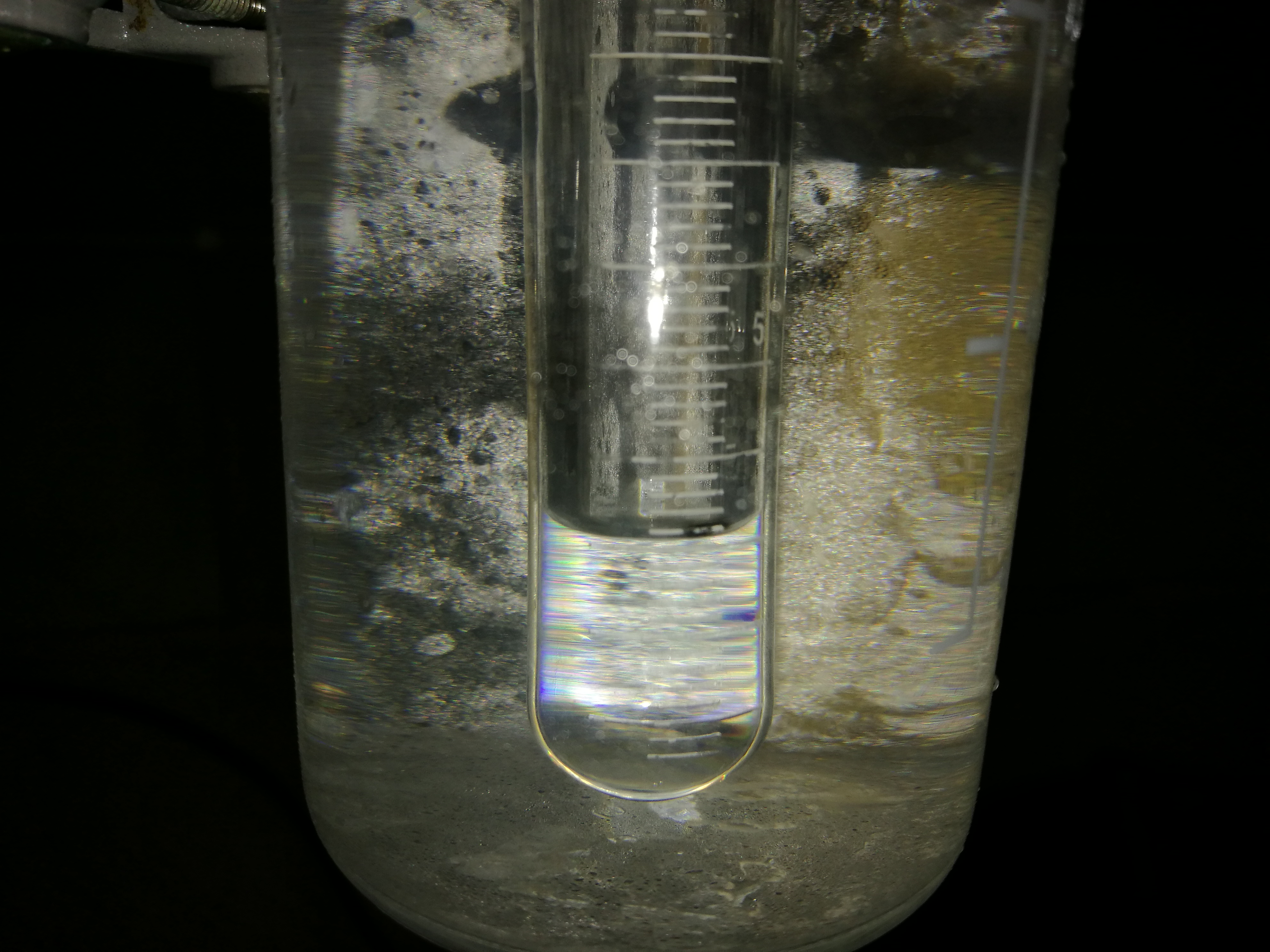
Cyclopentadiene monomer in an ice bath

Cyclopentadiene production is usually not distinguished from dicyclopentadiene since they interconvert. They are obtained from coal tar (about 10–20 g/t) and by steam cracking of naphtha (about 14 kg/t). To obtain cyclopentadiene monomer, commercial dicyclopentadiene is cracked by heating to around 180 °C. The monomer is collected by distillation and used soon thereafter. It advisable to use some form of fractionating column when doing this, to remove refluxing uncracked dimer.

=== Sigmatropic rearrangement ===
The hydrogen atoms in cyclopentadiene undergo rapid [1,5]-sigmatropic shifts. The hydride shift is, however, sufficiently slow at 0 °C to allow alkylated derivatives to be manipulated selectively.

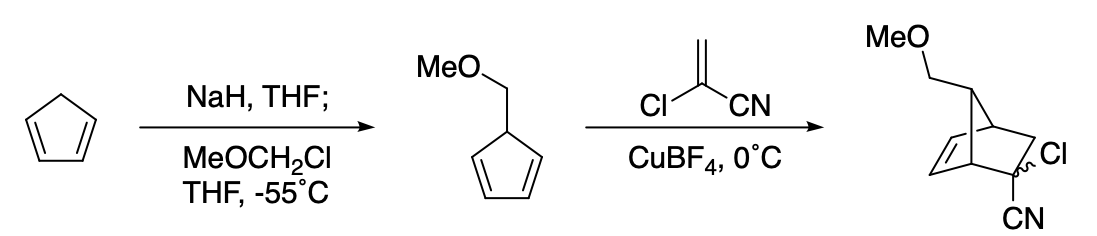
The methoxy group ends up only on the methylene bridge, because Diels-Alder addition at −55 °C occurs much faster than the sigmatropic shift (excerpted from Corey's total synthesis of prostaglandin F_{2α})

Even more fluxional are the derivatives C_{5}H_{5}E(CH_{3})_{3} (E = Si, Ge, Sn), wherein the heavier element migrates from carbon to carbon with a low activation barrier.

=== Diels–Alder reactions ===
Cyclopentadiene is a highly reactive diene in the Diels–Alder reaction because minimal distortion of the diene is required to achieve the envelope geometry of the transition state compared to other dienes. Famously, cyclopentadiene dimerizes. The conversion occurs in hours at room temperature, but the monomer can be stored for days at −20 °C.

=== Deprotonation ===
The compound is unusually acidic (pK_{a} = 16) for a hydrocarbon due to the high stability of the aromatic cyclopentadienyl anion, C_{5}H^{−}_{5}. Deprotonation can be achieved with a variety of bases, typically sodium hydride, sodium metal, and butyllithium. Salts of this anion are commercially available, including sodium cyclopentadienide and lithium cyclopentadienide. They are used to prepare cyclopentadienyl complexes.

=== Metallocene derivatives ===
Metallocenes and related cyclopentadienyl derivatives have been heavily investigated and represent a cornerstone of organometallic chemistry owing to their high stability. The first metallocene characterised, ferrocene, was prepared the way many other metallocenes are prepared by combining alkali metal derivatives of the form MC_{5}H_{5} with dihalides of the transition metals: As typical example, nickelocene forms upon treating nickel(II) chloride with sodium cyclopentadienide in THF.

NiCl_{2} + 2 NaC_{5}H_{5} → Ni(C_{5}H_{5})_{2} + 2 NaCl

Organometallic complexes that include both the cyclopentadienyl anion and cyclopentadiene itself are known, one example of which is the rhodocene derivative produced from the rhodocene monomer in protic solvents.

=== Organic synthesis ===
It was the starting material in Leo Paquette's 1982 synthesis of dodecahedrane. The first step involved reductive dimerization of the molecule to give dihydrofulvalene, not simple addition to give dicyclopentadiene.

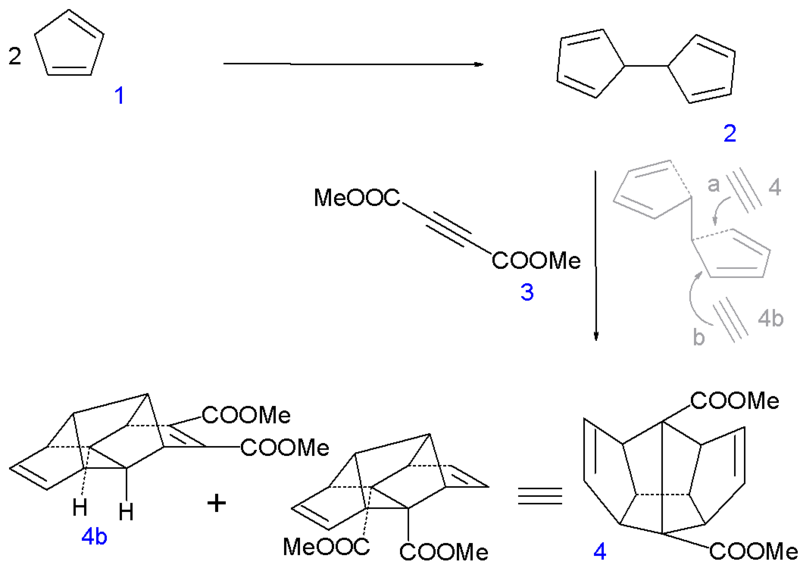
The start of Paquette's 1982 dodecahedrane synthesis. Note the dimerisation of cyclopentadiene in step 1 to dihydrofulvalene.

== Uses ==
Aside from serving as a precursor to cyclopentadienyl-based catalysts, the main commercial application of cyclopentadiene is as a precursor to comonomers. Semi-hydrogenation gives cyclopentene. Diels–Alder reaction with butadiene gives ethylidene norbornene, a comonomer in the production of EPDM rubbers.

== Derivatives ==
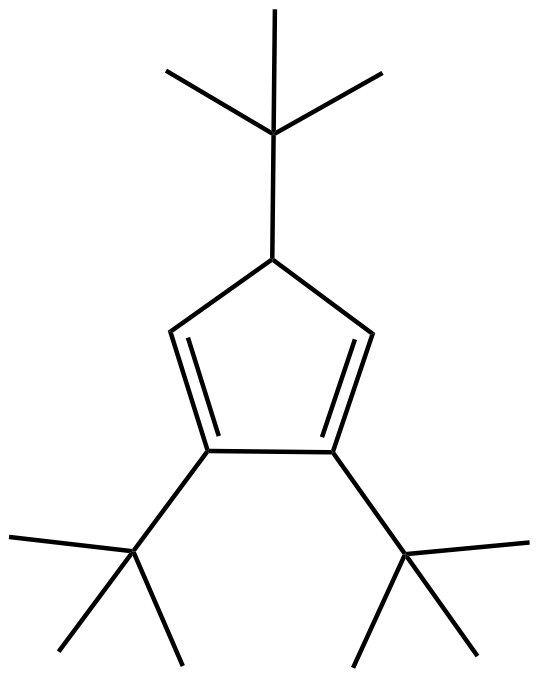
Structure of t-Bu_{3}C_{5}H_{3}, a prototypical bulky cyclopentadiene

Cyclopentadiene can substitute one or more hydrogens, forming derivatives having covalent bonds:

- Bulky cyclopentadienes
- Calicene
- Cyclopentadienone
- Di-tert-butylcyclopentadiene
- Methylcyclopentadiene
- Pentamethylcyclopentadiene
- Pentacyanocyclopentadiene

Most of these substituted cyclopentadienes can also form anions and join cyclopentadienyl complexes.

Alternatively, sulfonium ion substitution on cyclopentadiene can generate stable cationic species.

== See also ==
- Aromaticity
