= Cyclopentadienyl =

Cyclopentadienyl can refer to

- Cyclopentadienyl anion, or cyclopentadienide, [C_{5}H_{5}]^{−}
  - Cyclopentadienyl ligand
- Cyclopentadienyl radical, [C_{5}H_{5}]^{•}
- Cyclopentadienyl cation, [C_{5}H_{5}]^{+}

== See also ==
- Pentadienyl
