= Sodium cyclopentadienide =

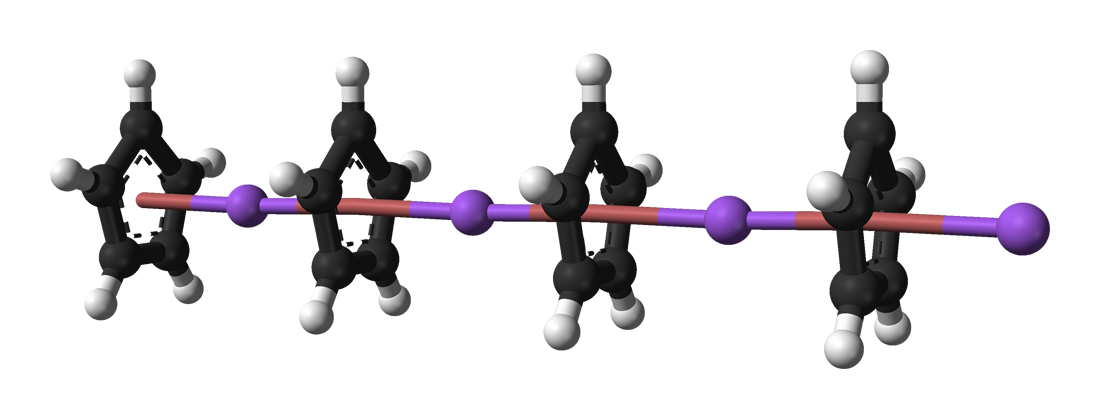

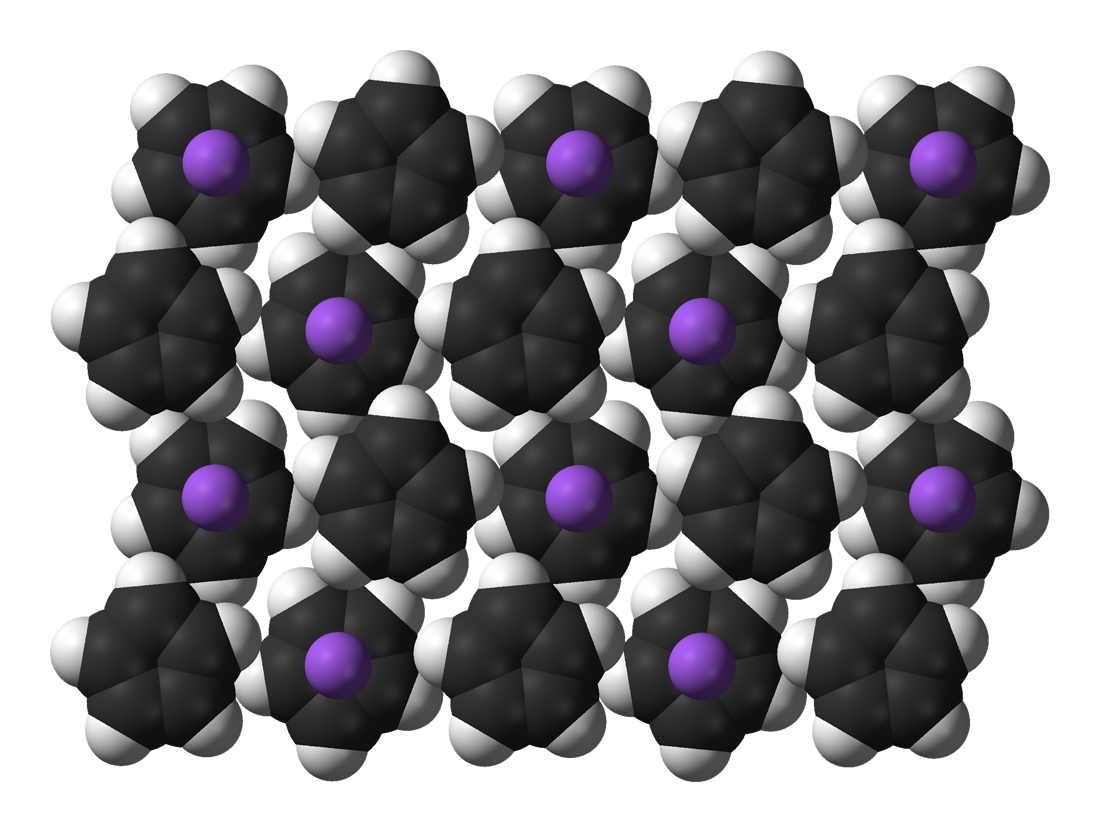

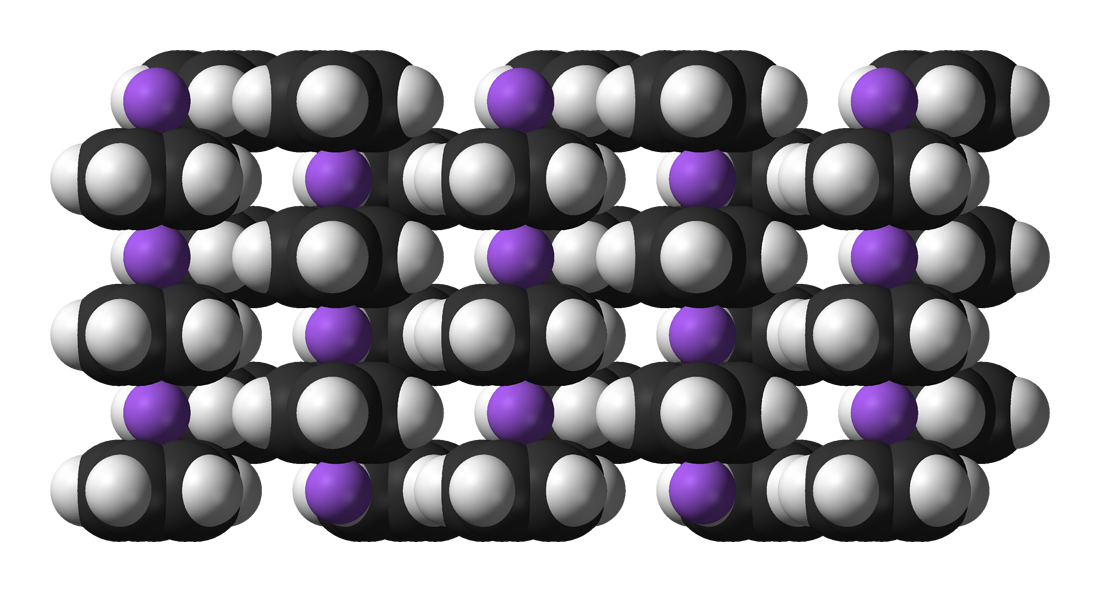

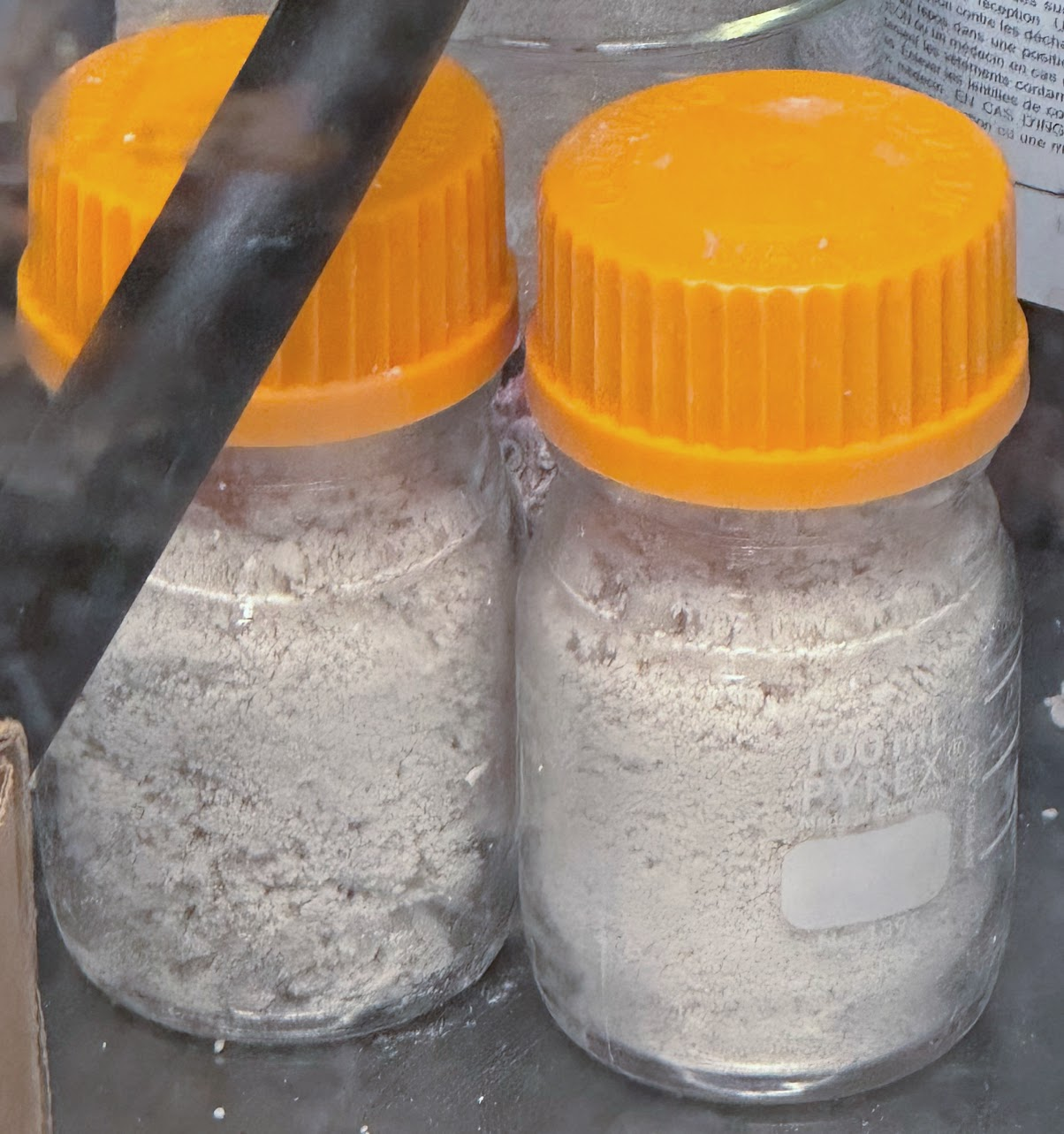
- NaCp synthesized in an inert atmosphere

Names
- Preferred IUPAC name Sodium cyclopentadienide
- Other names Sodium cyclopentadienylide, Cyclopentadienylsodium

Identifiers
CAS Number	4984-82-1
3D model (JSmol)	Interactive image
ChemSpider	71032
ECHA InfoCard	100.023.306
EC Number	225-636-8
PubChem CID	78681
CompTox Dashboard (EPA)	DTXSID9063665
- InChI: InChI=1S/C5H5.Na/c1-2-4-5-3-1;/h1-5H;/q-1;+1 Key: OHUVHDUNQKJDKW-UHFFFAOYSA-N; InChI=1S/C5H5.Na/c1-2-4-5-3-1;/h1-5H;/q-1;+1; Key: OHUVHDUNQKJDKW-UHFFFAOYSA-N
- SMILES: [Na+].c1[cH-]ccc1

Properties
Chemical formula	C_{5}H_{5}Na
Molar mass	88.085 g·mol^{−1}
Appearance	colorless solid
Density	1.113 g/cm^{3}
Solubility in water	decomposition
Solubility	THF

Hazards
- Occupational safety and health (OHS/OSH)
Main hazards	flammable
- Except where otherwise noted, data are given for materials in their standard state (at 25 °C [77 °F], 100 kPa). verify (what is ?) Infobox references

Sodium cyclopentadienide is an organosodium compound with the formula C_{5}H_{5}Na. The compound is often abbreviated as NaCp, where Cp^{−} is the cyclopentadienyl anion. Sodium cyclopentadienide is a colorless solid, although samples often are pink owing to traces of oxidized impurities.

== Preparation ==
The first salt of cyclopentadienide to be reported was potassium cyclopentadienide, prepared by Johannes Thiele. In 1901 there was not much interest in the topic.

Sodium cyclopentadienyl is prepared from cyclopentadiene and molten sodium metal: Sodium can also be provided as "sodium wire" or "sodium sand", the fine suspension produced when molten sodium is mixed with refluxing xylene, then cooled. The highly exothermic metallation can undergo catastrophic thermal runaway without proper cooling, as occurred in the T2 Laboratories explosion and fire.

Alternatively, many reagents deprotonate cyclopentadiene; it has pK_{a} 15. Early work used Grignard reagents as bases, but sodium hydride is more convenient nowadays:

NaH + C_{5}H_{6} → NaC_{5}H_{5} + H_{2}

Sodium cyclopentadienide is commercially available as a solution in THF.

== Applications ==
Sodium cyclopentadienide is a common reagent for the preparation of metallocenes. For example, the preparation of ferrocene and zirconocene dichloride:

2 NaC_{5}H_{5} + FeCl_{2} → Fe(C_{5}H_{5})_{2} + 2 NaCl
ZrCl_{4}(thf)_{2} + 2 NaCp → (C_{5}H_{5})_{2}ZrCl_{2} + 2 NaCl + 2 THF

Sodium cyclopentadienide is also used for the preparation of substituted cyclopentadienyl derivatives such as the ester and formyl derivatives:

NaC_{5}H_{5} + O=C(OEt)_{2} → NaC_{5}H_{4}CO_{2}Et + NaOEt

These compounds are used to prepare substituted metallocenes such as 1,1'-ferrocenedicarboxylic acid.

== Structure ==
The nature of NaCp depends strongly on its medium and for the purposes of planning syntheses; the reagent is often represented as a salt Na^{+}C_{5}H^{−}_{5}. Crystalline solvent-free NaCp, which is rarely encountered, is a "polydecker" sandwich complex, consisting of an infinite chain of alternating Na^{+} centers sandwiched between μ-η^{5}:η^{5}-C_{5}H_{5} ligands. As a solution in donor solvents, NaCp is highly solvated, especially at the alkali metal as suggested by the isolability of the adduct Na(tmeda)Cp.

In contrast to alkali metal cyclopentadienides, tetrabutylammonium cyclopentadienide (Bu_{4}N^{+}C_{5}H^{−}_{5}) was found to be supported entirely by ionic bonding and its structure is representative of the structure of the cyclopentadienide anion (C_{5}H^{−}_{5}, Cp^{−}) in the solid state. However, the anion deviates somewhat from a planar, regular pentagon, with C–C bond lengths ranging from 138.0–140.1 pm and C–C–C bond angles ranging from 107.5–108.8°.

Electron-deficient cyclopentadienes are more likely to form naked anions. [C_{5}(CF_{3})_{5}]^{−} (perfluoro-Cp*) has pK_{b} ≥ 16 and typically behaves as a weakly coordinating anion.

== See also ==
- Lithium cyclopentadienide
- Potassium cyclopentadienyl
