= Organochromium chemistry =

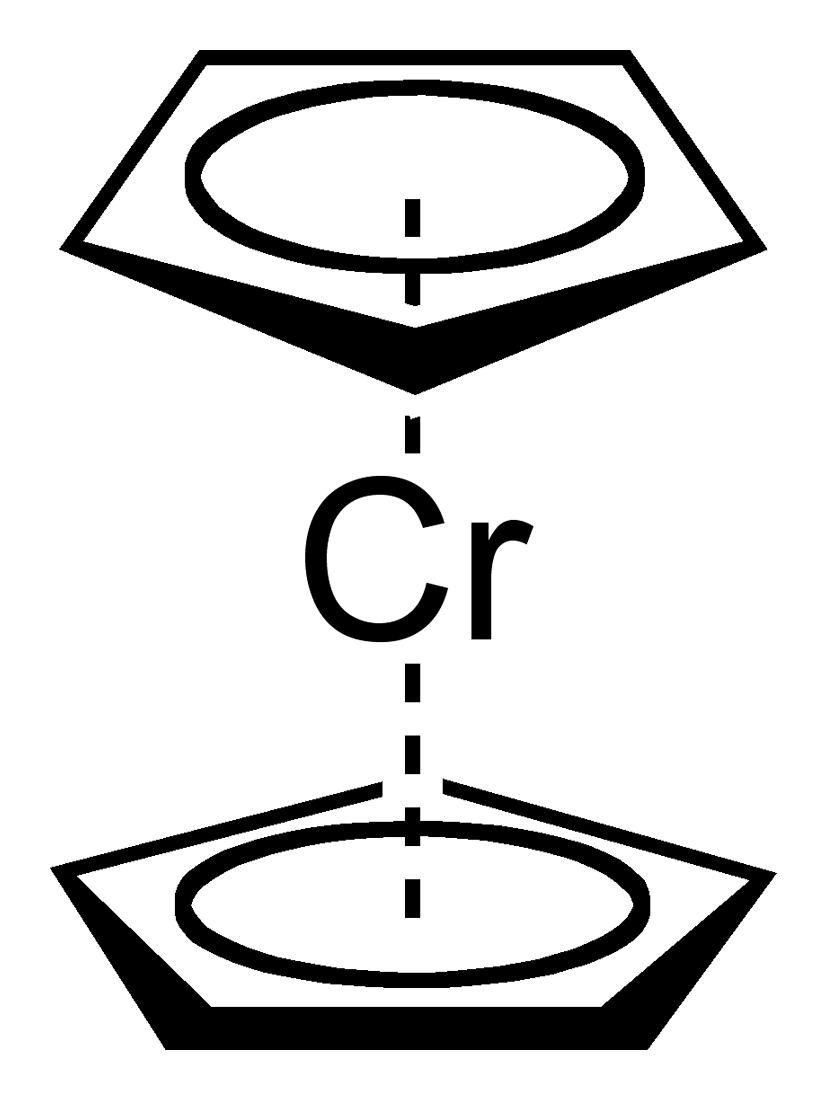
Chromocene

Organochromium chemistry is a branch of organometallic chemistry that deals with organic compounds containing a chromium to carbon bond and their reactions. The field is of some relevance to organic synthesis. The relevant oxidation states for organochromium complexes encompass the entire range of possible oxidation states from –4 (d^{10}) in Na_{4}[Cr^{–IV}(CO)_{4}] to +6 (d^{0}) in oxo-alkyl complexes like Cp*Cr^{VI}(=O)_{2}Me.

Organochromium compounds can be divided into these broad compound classes:

- Sandwich compounds: chromocene Cp_{2}Cr and Bis(benzene)chromium derivatives (ArH)_{2}Cr. More commonly studied are half-sandwich complexes such as (η^{6}-C_{6}H_{5}OMe)Cr(CO)_{3}.
- Chromium carbenes (R_{1})(R_{2})C::CrL_{n} and carbynes (RC:::CrL_{n})
- Chromium(III) complexes RCrL_{5}.
- Complexes of chromium carbonyl anion and cation (e.g Na_{4}Cr(CO)_{4}).

== History ==
The first organochromium compound was described in 1919 by Franz Hein. He treated phenylmagnesium bromide with chromium(III) chloride to give a new product (after hydrolysis) which he incorrectly identified as pentaphenyl chromium bromide (Ph_{5}CrBr). Years later, in 1957 H.H. Zeiss et al. repeated Hein's experiments and correctly arrived at a cationic bisarene chromium sandwich compound (ArH_{2}Cr^{+}). Bis(benzene)chromium itself was discovered around the same time in 1956 by Ernst Otto Fischer by reaction of chromium(III) chloride, benzene and aluminum chloride. The related compound chromocene had been discovered a few years earlier in 1953 also by Fischer.

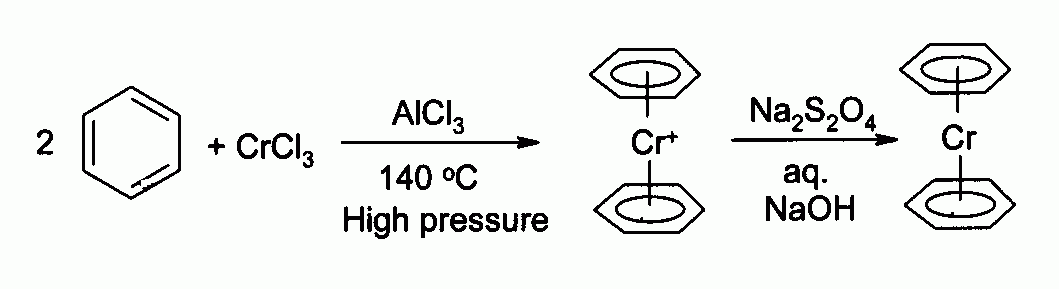

Anet and Leblanc also in 1957 prepared a benzyl chromium solution from benzyl bromide and chromium(II) perchlorate. This reaction involves one-electron oxidative addition of the carbon-bromine bond, a process which was shown by Kochi to be a case of double single electron transfer, first to give the benzyl free radical and then to the benzyl anion.

G. Wilke et al. introduced tris-(η-allyl)chromium in 1963 as an early Ziegler–Natta catalyst, albeit of limited commercial success. Chromocene compounds were first employed in ethylene polymerization in 1972 by Union Carbide and continue to be used today in the industrial production of high-density polyethylene.

The organochromium compound (phenylmethoxycarbene)pentacarbonylchromium, Ph(OCH_{3})C=Cr(CO)_{5} was the first carbene complex to be crystallographically characterized by Fischer in 1967 (now called a Fischer carbene). The first ever carbyne, this one also containing chromium, made its debut in 1973.

The first example of a proposed metal-metal quintuple bond is found in a compound of the type [CrAr]_{2}, where Ar is a bulky aryl ligand.

== Applications in organic synthesis ==
Although organochromium chemistry is heavily employed in industrial catalysis, relatively few reagents have been developed for applications in organic synthesis. Two are the Nozaki-Hiyama-Kishi reaction (1977) (transmetallation with organonickel intermediate) and the Takai olefination (1986)(oxidation of Cr(II) to Cr(III) while replacing halogens). In a niche exploit, certain tricarbonyl(arene)chromium complexes display benzylic activation.

Organochromium(III) compounds can also be used a stable source of alkyl radicals.

== Ethylene polymerization and oligomerization ==
Chromium catalysts are important in ethylene polymerization. The Phillips catalyst is prepared by impregnating chromium(VI) oxide on silica followed activation in dry air at high temperatures. The bright yellow catalyst becomes reduced by the ethylene to afford a probable Cr(II) species that is catalytically active. A related catalytic systems developed by Union Carbide and DSM are also based on silica with chromocene and other chromium complexes. How these catalysts work is unclear. One model system describes it as coordination polymerization:

With two THF ligands the catalyst is stable but in dichloromethane one ligand is lost to form a 13 electron chromium intermediate. This enables side-on addition of an ethylene unit and a polymer chain can grow by migratory insertion.

Chromium compounds also catalyse the trimerization of ethylene to produce the monomer 1-hexene.
