= Bis(benzene)chromium =

Bis(benzene)chromium
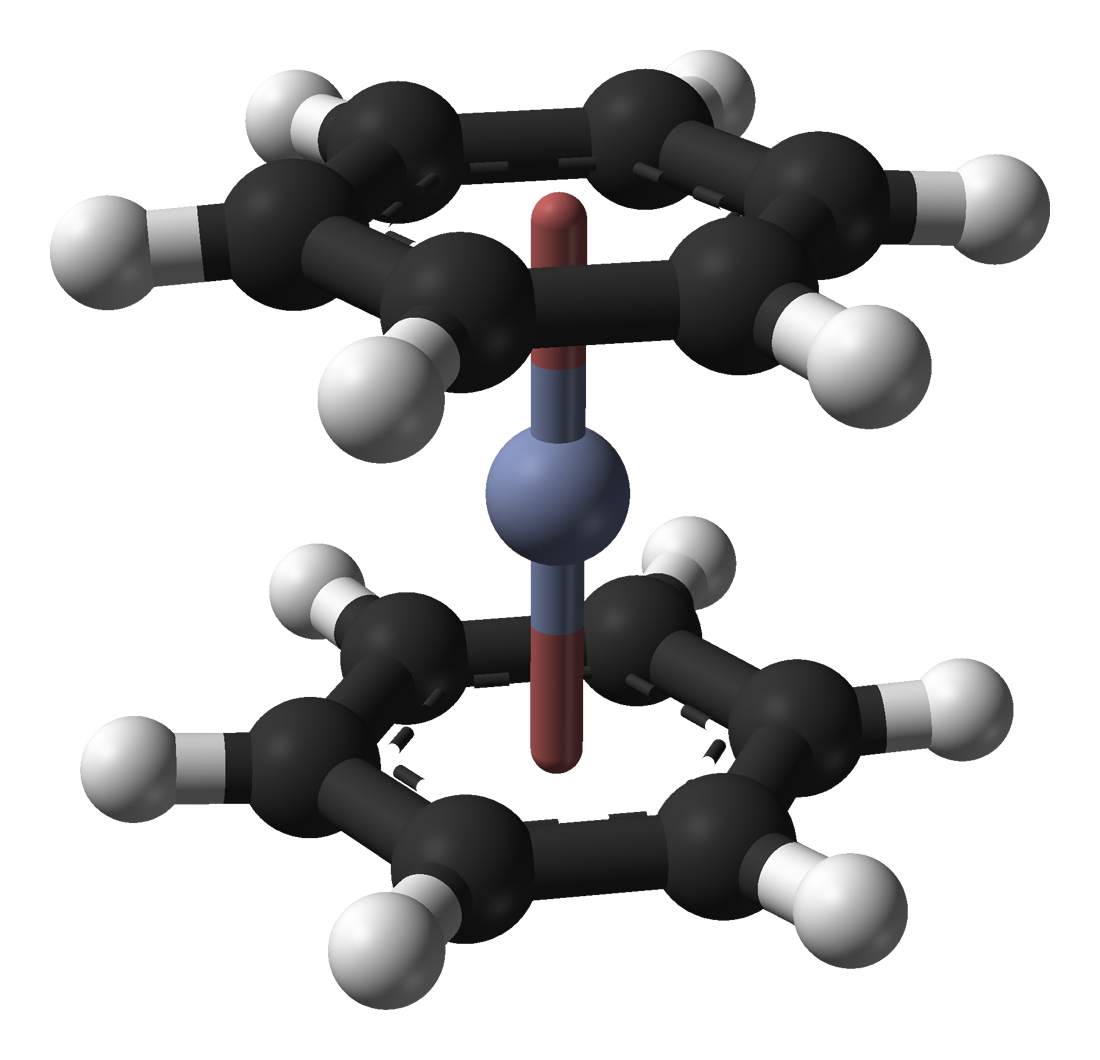
Bis(benzene)chromium
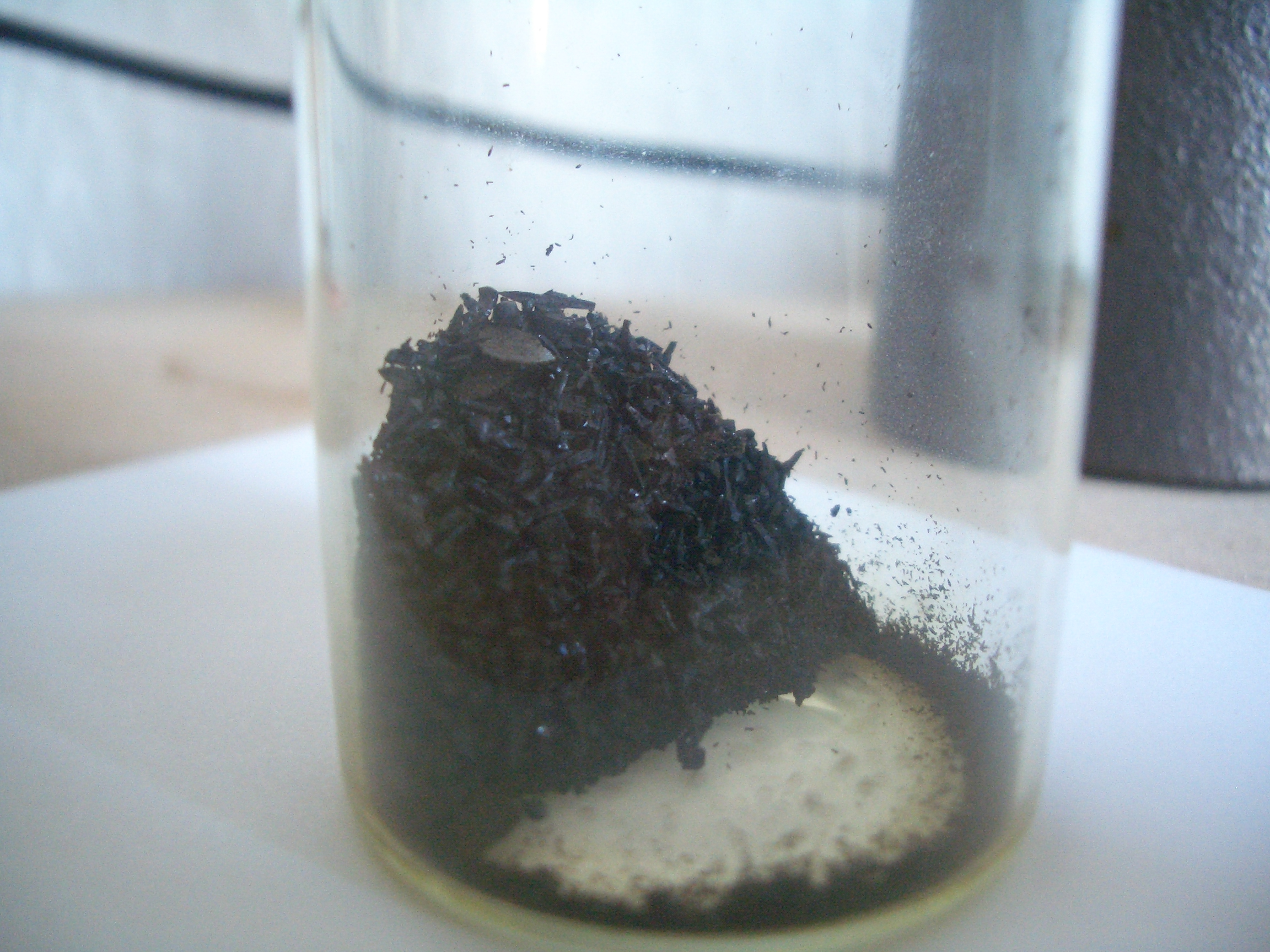
- Bis(benzene)chromium (sublimated, under nitrogen)

Names
- IUPAC name Bis(η^{6}-benzene)chromium
- Other names di(benzene)chromium dibenzenechromium

Identifiers
CAS Number	1271-54-1
3D model (JSmol)	Interactive image
ChemSpider	10157111
ECHA InfoCard	100.013.675
EC Number	215-042-7
PubChem CID	11984611
RTECS number	GB5850000
CompTox Dashboard (EPA)	DTXSID40155402
- InChI: InChI=1S/2C6H6.Cr/c2*1-2-4-6-5-3-1;/h2*1-6H;/q;-6; Key: IWCQVOVBDXJJDF-UHFFFAOYSA-N
- SMILES: c1ccccc1.[Cr].c1ccccc1

Properties
Chemical formula	Cr(C_{6}H_{6})_{2}
Molar mass	208.224 g·mol^{−1}
Appearance	brown-black crystals
Melting point	284 to 285 °C (543 to 545 °F; 557 to 558 K)
Boiling point	Sublimes at 160 °C (320 °F; 433 K) in vacuum
Solubility in water	insoluble
Solubility in other solvents	slightly: benzene, THF

Structure
Coordination geometry	pseudooctahedral
Dipole moment	0 D

Hazards
- Occupational safety and health (OHS/OSH)
Main hazards	flammable
- GHS labelling
Pictograms	(GHS02: Flammable)
Signal word	Warning
Hazard statements	H228
Precautionary statements	P210, P240, P241, P280, P378
Flash point	82 °C; 180 °F; 355 K

Related compounds
Related compounds	Metallocene; f-Block metallocene; Actinocene; Uranocene; Zirconocene; Vanadocene; Chromocene; Ferrocene; Plumbocene
- Except where otherwise noted, data are given for materials in their standard state (at 25 °C [77 °F], 100 kPa). verify (what is ?) Infobox references

Bis(benzene)chromium is the organometallic compound with the formula Cr(η^{6}-C_{6}H_{6})_{2}. It is sometimes called dibenzenechromium. The compound played an important role in the development of sandwich compounds in organometallic chemistry and is the prototypical complex containing two arene ligands.

== Historical background ==
In the late 1910s, Franz Hein started the investigation of "triphenylchromium" by reacting chromium trichloride with a Grignard reagent, phenyl magnesium bromide. Such a reaction gave a mixture of phenyl chromium, and Hein suggested that it contained a Cr(VI) species, "(C_{6}H_{5})_{5}CrBr", generated via valence disproportionation.

5 C_{6}H_{5}MgBr + 4 CrCl_{3} → (C_{6}H_{5})_{5}CrBr + 2 MgBr_{2} + 3 MgCl_{2} + 3 CrCl_{2}

This event marked an advance in organochromium chemistry at the time. "(C_{6}H_{5})_{5}CrBr" was described as having salt-like properties. However, the reported workup procedures for "(C_{6}H_{5})_{5}CrBr" was challenging, and the yield was low. Zeiss and Tsutsui found that Hein's formulation of the chromium-containing products was flawed.

== Preparation ==
Ernst Otto Fischer proposed the synthesis of a chromium(0) complex with two benzene ligands, which would have a sandwich structure similar to that of ferrocene. In 1954, Walter Hafner, one of Fischer's PhD student put the idea into practice using the "reductive Friedel-Crafts reaction." Before their preparation of bis(benzene)chromium, it was known that heating chromium trichloride, aluminium trichloride, and aluminium powder in benzene under high pressures of carbon monoxide affords chromium hexacarbonyl. Under these conditions the aluminium trichloride abstracts chloride from the chromium, and the aluminium metal reduces Cr(III). Hafner repeated this procedure but omitted the CO, resulting in the formation of yellow [Cr(C_{6}H_{6})_{2}]^{+}:

6 C_{6}H_{6} + 3 CrCl_{3} + 2 Al + x AlCl_{3} → 3 [(C_{6}H_{6})_{2}Cr][AlCl_{4}]·(x−1)AlCl_{3}

Excess aluminium trichloride is needed to solubilize the product. The product [(C_{6}H_{6})_{2}Cr]^{+} is not particularly air-sensitive. The cation is then reduced by sodium dithionite in aqueous sodium hydroxide. The resulting solid was bis(benzene)chromium:

2 [(C_{6}H_{6})_{2}Cr]^{+} + S_{2}O^{2−}_{4} + 4 OH^{−} → 2 (C_{6}H_{6})_{2}Cr + 2 SO^{2−}_{3} + 2 H_{2}O

The synthesis was intensely examined. Among the many results was the finding that the procedure was catalyzed by the presence of mesitylene. Heating [Cr(C_{6}H_{6})_{2}]^{+} with aqueous base results in disproportionation.

Fischer and Seus soon prepared Hein's [Cr(C_{6}H_{5}−C_{6}H_{5})_{2}]^{+} by an unambiguous route, thus confirming that Hein had unknowingly discovered sandwich complexes, a half-century ahead of the work on ferrocene. Illustrating the rapid pace of this research, the same issue of Chem. Ber. also describes the Mo(0) complex.

Using the technique of metal vapor synthesis, bis(benzene)chromium and many analogous compounds can be prepared by co-condensation of Cr vapor and arenes. In this way, the phosphabenzene complex [Cr(C_{5}H_{5}P)_{2}] can be prepared.

== Properties and characterization ==
Bis(benzene)chromium is thermally stable under an inert gas atmosphere. It is diamagnetic.

In 1956, Fischer and Weiss determined structure of bis(benzene)chromium by X-ray crystallography. It crystallizes with centrosymmetry in a cubic space group. The Cr-C distances are 214.1 and the C-C distances are 141.6 picometers. The C-C bonds are elongated from 139 pm for free benzene.

According to electrochemical studies, the half-wave potential (E_{1/2}) of the +1/0 couple is around -1.10 to -1.25 V versus Ferrocenium/Ferrocene at room temperature. Consequently oxygen oxidizes it to [Cr(PhH)_{2}]^{+}.

== Bonding and electronic structure ==
Theoretical chemical bonding of bis(benzene)chromium has been investigated since the discovery of this compound. The ground state configuration is (3e_{2g})^{4}(4a_{1g})^{2} (3e_{2u})^{0}. Analysis of the frontier orbitals suggested that the chromium-benzene interaction is largely contributed by the 𝝅 and/or 𝞭 interactions between the 3d metal orbitals and ligand 𝝅 orbitals. 3e_{2g} (HOMO-1) and 3e_{1g} (HOMO-2) molecular orbitals are 𝞭-bonding interactions between metal 3d𝞭 and ligand 𝝅 orbitals. The highest occupied molecular orbital (HOMO), 4a_{1g}, is the non-bonding metal d_{z2} orbital. The lowest unoccupied molecular orbital (LUMO) is 3e_{2u}, which is purely ligand 𝝅 orbital. As for 4e_{1g} (LUMO+1) and 4e_{2g} (LUMO+2), they are composed of anti-bonding interaction between 3d𝝅 and ligand 𝝅 orbitals.

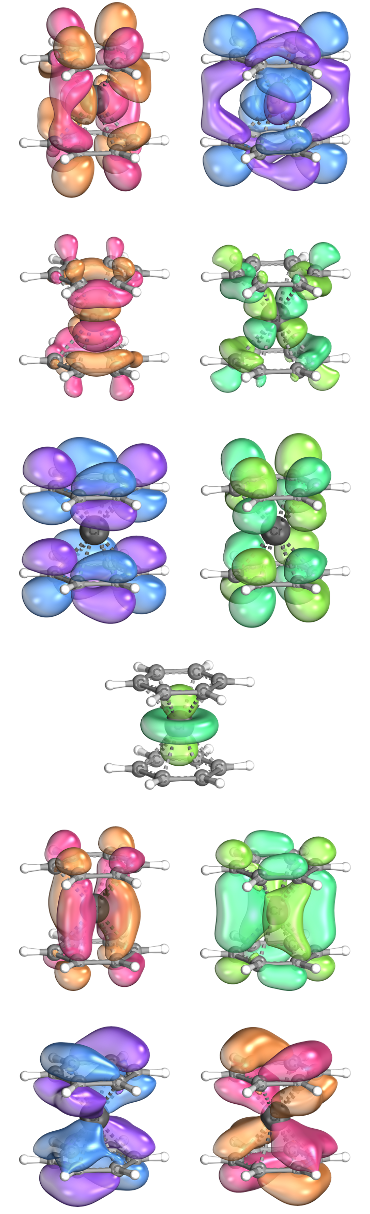
Molecular orbitals of bis(benzene)chromium, visualized by IboView. (Top to bottom: LUMO+2, LUMO+1, LUMO, HOMO, HOMO-1, HOMO-2)

Charge Distribution (%) of Ground State Bis(benzene)chromium
		Cr			C			H
Molecular Orbital	No. of Electrons	s	p	d	s	p𝝈	p𝝅	s
4e_{1g}	0			73	2	2	10	
3e_{2u}	0						73	
4a_{1g}	2	1		82		1	1	1
3e_{2g}	4			50		2	21	
3e_{1g}	4			16		1	52	
4e_{1u}	4		4				49	
2e_{2u}	4					60		17
2e_{2g}	4			1		60		18
4a_{2u}	2		4				61	
3a_{1g}	2	8					53	

3d orbitals population of chromium(0) in bis(benzene)chromium was investigated, utilizing NBO analysis. While e_{2g} largely results from electron donation from the metal to the ligand, e_{1g} is mainly composed of the electrons donated from the benzene ligands.

3d orbital population of Cr in Bis(benzene)chromium
Molecular Orbitals	NBO	X-ray
4a_{1g}	1.896/36%	1.62(1)/35%
3e_{2g}	2.412/45%	1.953(7)/42%
3e_{1g}	1.026/19%	1.112(7)/24%

In contrast to ferrocene, where 𝝅-interactions dominate the metal-ligand bonds, 𝞭-interactions play a significant role in bis(benzene)chromium.

Energy Decomposition Analysis at BP86/TZP of Ferrocene and Bisbenzenechromium
		Ferrocene	Bis(benzene)chromium
Electrostatic Interaction %		51.1	37.9
Covalent Interaction %		48.9	62.1
Contribution to Covalent Interaction %	𝝅-interactions (e_{1g})	64.7	14.7
Contribution to Covalent Interaction %	𝞭-interactions (e_{2g})	8.3	73.4

== Reactivity ==
The compound reacts with carboxylic acids to give chromium(II) carboxylates, such as chromium(II) acetate. Oxidation affords [Cr(C_{6}H_{6})_{2}]^{+}. Carbonylation gives (benzene)chromium tricarbonyl. The hexakis(trifluorophosphine complex can be prepared similarly by displacement of both benzene ligand:

Cr(C_{6}H_{6})_{2} + 6 PF_{3} → Cr(PF_{3})_{6} + 2 C_{6}H_{6}

In late 1990s, Samuel and coworkers revealed that bis(benzene)chromium is an efficient organometallic radical scavenger. In contrast to cobaltocene, which traps radicals (R^{•}) to form 18-valence electron species (η^{5}-C_{5}H_{5})(η^{4}-C_{5}H_{5}R)Co, bis(benzene)chromium reacts with radicals to form 17-valence electron species (η^{6}-C_{6}H_{6})(η^{5}-C_{6}H_{6}R)Cr (R = H, D, isobutyronitrile).

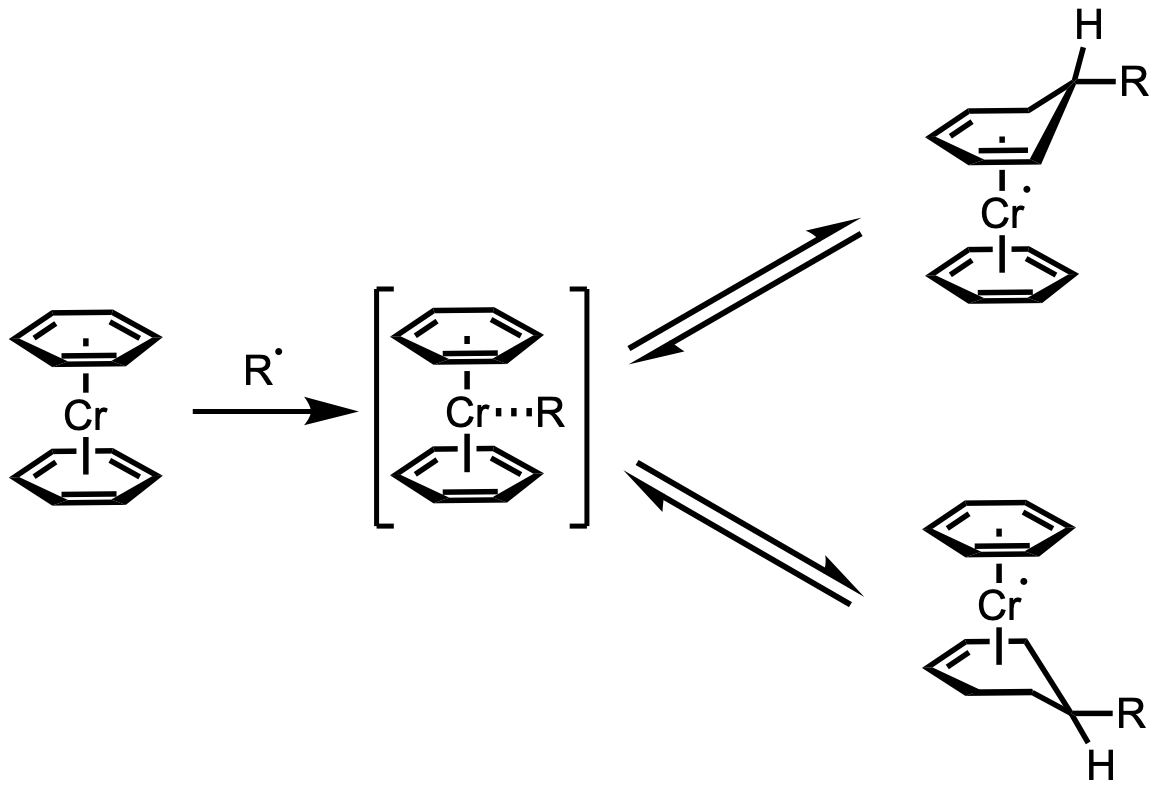
Spin trapping by bis(benzene)chromium (R = H, D, isobutyronitrile)

Subsequently, bis(benzene)chromium was reported to catalyze hydrosilation of alcohols and aldehydes. Unlike late transition metal-catalyzed processes involving oxidative addition, the mechanism of this reaction is proposed to involve radicals and hydrogen atom abstraction.

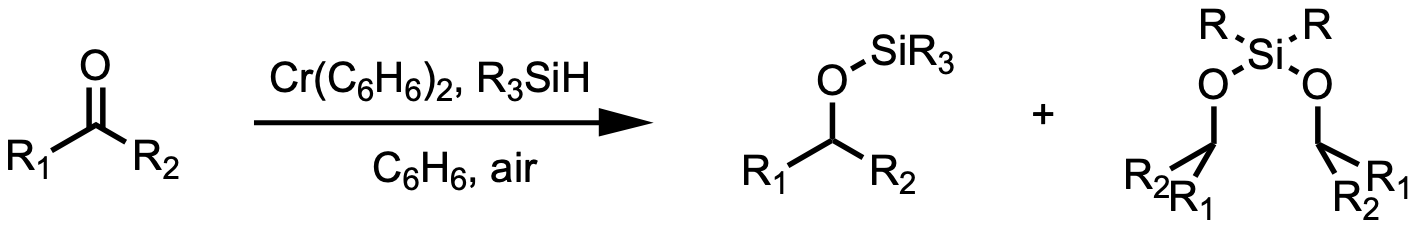
Hydrosilation of ketones catalyzed by bis(benzene)chromium

The compound finds limited use in organic synthesis.
