= Chromocene =

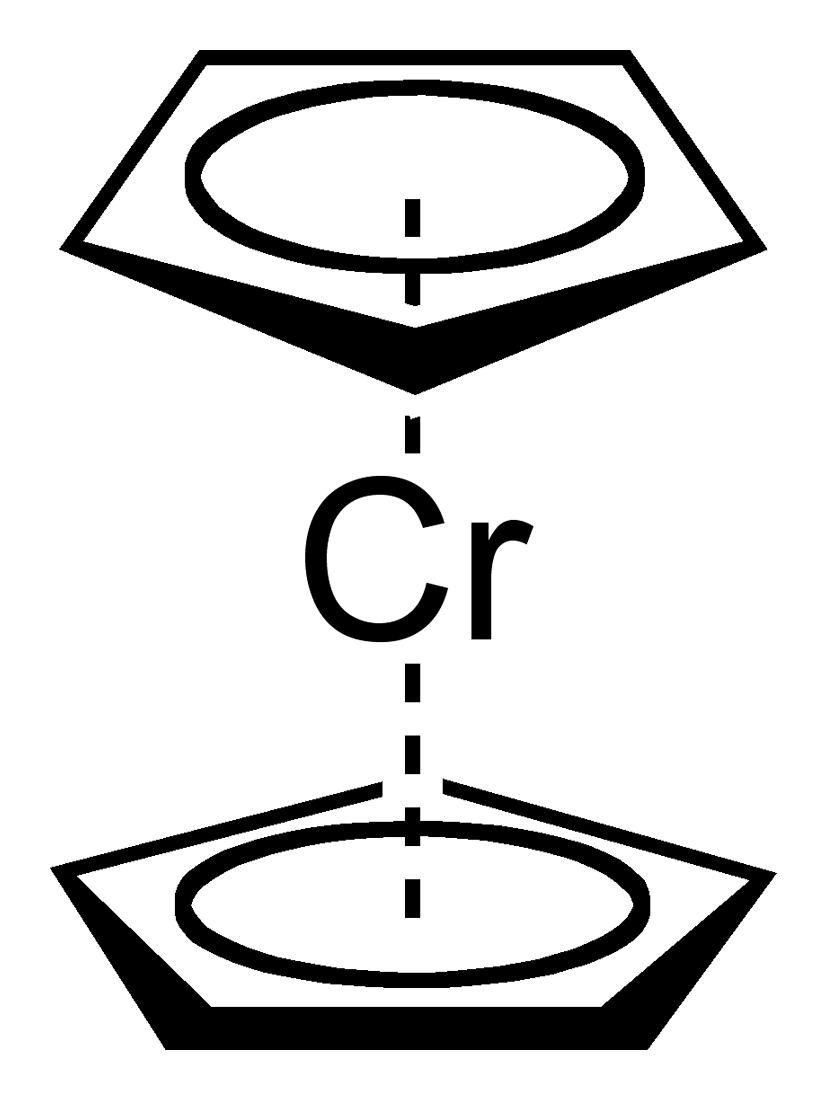
Chromocene
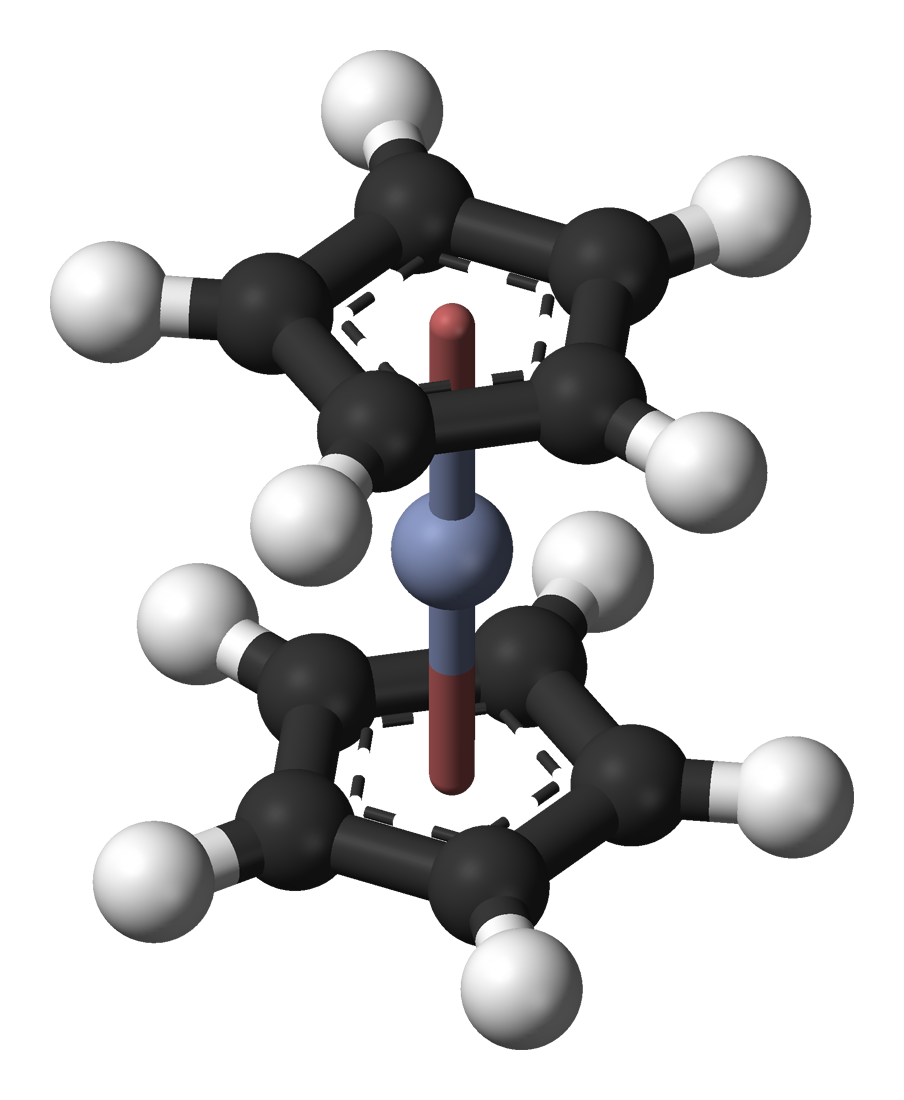
Chromocene

Names
- IUPAC name Chromocene
- Systematic IUPAC name Bis(η^{5}-cyclopentadienyl)chromium(II)
- Other names Dicyclopentadienylchromium(II)

Identifiers
CAS Number	1271-24-5
3D model (JSmol)	Interactive image
ChEBI	CHEBI:30677
ChemSpider	71485
ECHA InfoCard	100.013.670
EC Number	215-036-4
Gmelin Reference	3366
PubChem CID	79154
RTECS number	GB7600000
UNII	FI251W8B1L
UN number	1325
CompTox Dashboard (EPA)	DTXSID7024615
- InChI: InChI=1/2C5H5.Cr/c2*1-2-4-5-3-1;/h2*1-5H;/q2*-1;+2 Key: TYYBBNOTQFVVKN-UHFFFAOYAS
- SMILES: [Cr+2].[cH-]1cccc1.c1[cH-]ccc1

Properties
Chemical formula	C_{10}H_{10}Cr
Molar mass	182.186 g·mol^{−1}
Appearance	dark red crystals
Density	1.43 g/cm^{3}
Melting point	168 to 170 °C (334 to 338 °F; 441 to 443 K)
Boiling point	Sublimes (under vacuum)
Solubility in water	Insoluble

Structure
Coordination geometry	Pseudooctahedral see Ferrocene
Dipole moment	0 D

Hazards
- Occupational safety and health (OHS/OSH)
Main hazards	Pyrophoric
- GHS labelling
Pictograms	(GHS02: Flammable) (GHS05: Corrosive) (GHS07: Exclamation mark)
Signal word	Danger
Hazard statements	H302, H312, H314, H315, H317, H319, H332, H335
NFPA 704 (fire diamond)	1 0 0

Related compounds
Related compounds	Fe(C_{5}H_{5})_{2} Ni(C_{5}H_{5})_{2} bis(benzene)chromium chromium(II) acetate
- Except where otherwise noted, data are given for materials in their standard state (at 25 °C [77 °F], 100 kPa). Infobox references

Chromocene is the organochromium compound with the formula [Cr(C_{5}H_{5})_{2}]. Like structurally related metallocenes, chromocene readily sublimes in a vacuum and is soluble in non-polar organic solvents. It is more formally known as bis(η^{5}-cyclopentadienyl)chromium(II).

== Synthesis ==
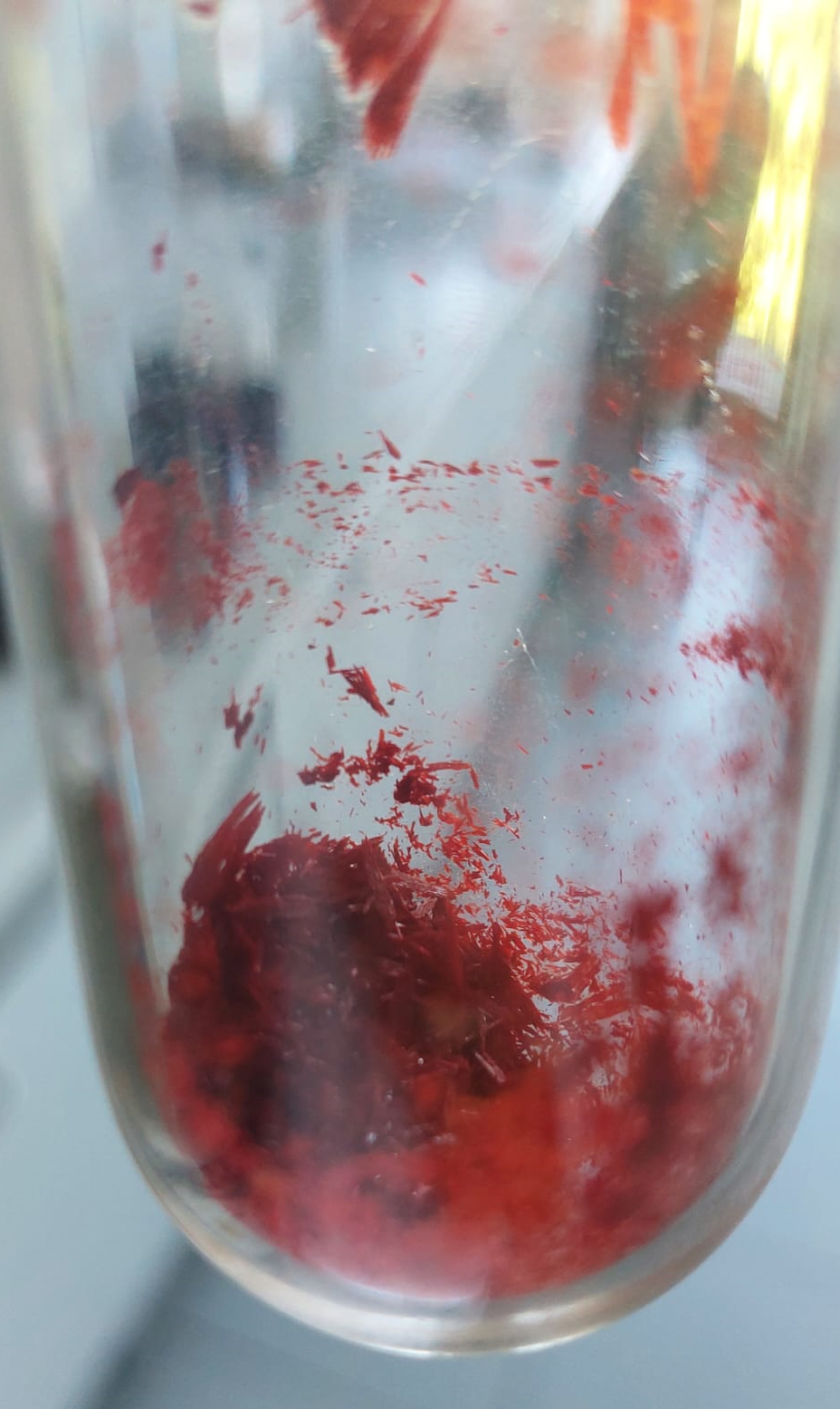
Red crystals of chromocene under inert atmosphere in a schlenk flask

Ernst Otto Fischer, who shared the 1973 Nobel Prize in Chemistry for work on sandwich compounds, first described the synthesis of chromocene. One simple method of preparation involves the reaction of chromium(II) chloride with sodium cyclopentadienide:

CrCl_{2} + 2 NaC_{5}H_{5} → Cr(C_{5}H_{5})_{2} + 2 NaCl

Such syntheses are typically conducted in tetrahydrofuran. Decamethylchromocene, Cr[C_{5}(CH_{3})_{5}]_{2}, can be prepared analogously from LiC_{5}(CH_{3})_{5}. Chromocene can also be prepared from chromium(III) chloride in a redox process:

2 CrCl_{3} + 6 NaC_{5}H_{5} → 2 Cr(C_{5}H_{5})_{2} + C_{10}H_{10} + 6 NaCl

== Structure and bonding ==
The structure of chromocene has been verified by X-ray crystallography. The average Cr–C bond length is 215.1(13) pm. Each molecule contains an atom of chromium bound between two planar systems of five carbon atoms known as cyclopentadienyl (Cp) rings in a sandwich arrangement, which is the reason its formula is often abbreviated as Cp_{2}Cr. Chromocene is structurally similar to ferrocene, the prototype for the metallocene class of compounds. Electron diffraction studies suggest that the Cp rings in chromocene are eclipsed (point group D_{5h}) rather than staggered (point group D_{5d}), though the energy barrier to rotation is small.

With only 16 valence electrons, it does not follow the 18-electron rule. It is a paramagnetic compound.

== Reactions ==
The main reactivity associated with chromocene follow from it being highly reducing and the lability of the Cp ligands.

The complex exhibits diverse reactions, usually involving displacement of one cyclopentadienyl ring. Carbonylation has been examined in detail, leads ultimately to chromium hexacarbonyl. An intermediate is cyclopentadienylchromium tricarbonyl dimer:

2 Cr(C_{5}H_{5})_{2} + 6 CO → [Cr(C_{5}H_{5})(CO)_{3}]_{2} + "(C_{5}H_{5})_{2}"

Chromocene provides a convenient route for preparing the anhydrous form of chromium(II) acetate, a useful precursor to other chromium(II) compounds. The reaction involves the displacement of cyclopentadienyl ligands by the formation of cyclopentadiene:

4 CH_{3}CO_{2}H + 2 Cr(C_{5}H_{5})_{2} → Cr_{2}(O_{2}CCH_{3})_{4} + 4 C_{5}H_{6}

Chromocene decomposes on contact with silica gel to give the Union Carbide catalyst for ethylene polymerization, although other synthetic routes exist for the formation of this important catalyst.

== Safety ==
Chromocene is highly reactive toward air and could ignite upon exposure to the atmosphere.
