= Franz Hein =

German scientist and artist (1892–1976)

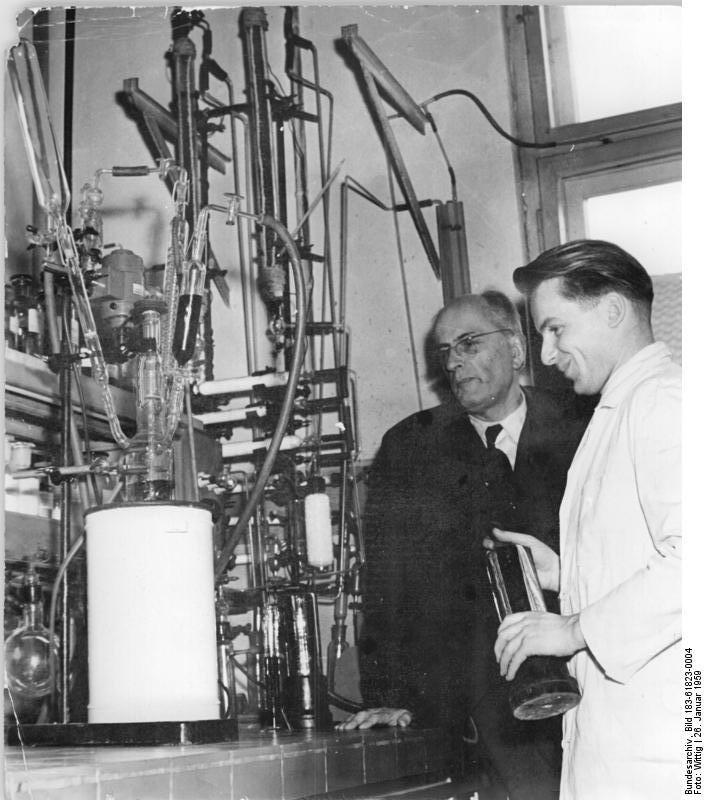
- Franz Hein with Erhard Kurras in 1959
- Born: 30 June 1892; Grötzingen, German Empire
- Died: 26 February 1976 (aged 83); Radebeul, East Germany
- Education: University of Leipzig
- Scientific career
- Doctoral advisor: Arthur Rudolf Hantzsch

Franz Hein (30 June 1892 – 26 February 1976) was a German chemist and professor. He specialized in the chemistry of organic chromium and other metal compounds. He was the son of the artist Franz Johann Erich Hein (1863–1927).

== History ==
Franz Hein was born in Grötzingen (Baden), Germany. His high school years were spent in Leipzig, where his father Franz Johann Erich Hein (1863–1927) was an artist and teacher. He then went to the University of Leipzig in 1912. Hein completed his Ph.D. in 1917 under Arthur Hantzsch (1857-1935) on optical studies of bismuth and triphenylmethane derivatives. Hein made Assistant at the university and in 1920 Oberassistent. He continued working on his Habilitation becoming a professor in 1923. With the completion of his Habilitation, Hein went to work on organometallic system electrochemistry.

In 1933, Hein signed the Vow of allegiance of the Professors of the German Universities and High-Schools to Adolf Hitler and the National Socialistic State.

From 1941 to 1965, Hein worked on main-group-metal derivatives of metal carbonyls. After 1942, he moved from Leipzig to the Friedrich Schiller University of Jena where he became the director of the Institute for Inorganic Chemistry. War came in March 1945 and the university was destroyed. Hein came back to help rebuild towards the end of 1946. He declined an offer at the University of Leipzig in 1949. Until his retirement, he held a position as a chair in inorganic chemistry until 1959.

== Phenylchromium compounds ==
With the reaction of anhydrous chromium(III) chloride (CrCl_{3}) and phenylmagnesium bromide (C_{6}H_{5}MgBr), Hein created a mixture of compounds. He was able to produce what he called phenylmagnesium salts. Hein denoted them as: (C_{6}H_{5})_{5}CrX, (C_{6}H_{5})_{4}CrX, and (C_{6}H_{5})_{3}CrX. However, it was later found that the correct structures were of sandwich compound type complexes and based on biphenyl not phenyl. The discovery of ferrocene and the research done by Zeiss, Tsutsui, and others lead to this structure determination.

== See also ==
- Bis(benzene)chromium
