= Metallocene =

Type of compound having a metal center

General chemical structure of a metallocene compound, where M is a metal cation

A metallocene is a compound typically consisting of two cyclopentadienyl anions (C_{5}H^{−}_{5}, abbreviated Cp) bound to a metal center (M). They have the general formula [(C_{5}R_{5})_{2}M]^{+} (R = H, alkyl typically). Closely related to the metallocenes are the metallocene derivatives, e.g. titanocene dichloride or vanadocene dichloride. Certain metallocenes and their derivatives exhibit catalytic properties, although metallocenes are rarely used industrially. Cationic group 4 metallocene derivatives related to [Cp_{2}ZrCH_{3}]^{+} catalyze olefin polymerization.

Metallocenes are a subset of a broader class of compounds called sandwich compounds. In the structure shown at right, the two pentagons are the cyclopentadienyl anions with circles inside them indicating they are aromatically stabilized. Here they are shown in a staggered conformation.

== History ==
Ferrocene

The first metallocene was ferrocene, discovered simultaneously in 1951 by Kealy and Pauson, and Miller et al. Kealy and Pauson were attempting to synthesize fulvalene through the oxidation of a cyclopentadienyl salt with anhydrous FeCl_{3} but obtained instead the substance C_{10}H_{10}Fe At the same time, Miller et al reported the same iron product from a reaction of cyclopentadiene with iron in the presence of aluminum, potassium, or molybdenum oxides. The structure of "C_{10}H_{10}Fe" was determined by Geoffrey Wilkinson et al. and by Ernst Otto Fischer et al. These two were awarded the Nobel Prize in Chemistry in 1973 for their work on sandwich compounds, including the structural determination of ferrocene. They determined that the carbon atoms of the cyclopentadienyl (Cp) ligand contributed equally to the bonding and that bonding occurred due to the metal d-orbitals and the π-electrons in the p-orbitals of the Cp ligands. This complex is now known as ferrocene, and the group of transition metal dicyclopentadienyl compounds is known as metallocenes. Metallocenes have the general formula [(η^{5}-C_{5}H_{5})_{2}M]. Fischer et al. first prepared the ferrocene derivatives involving Co and Ni. Often derived from substituted derivatives of cyclopentadienide, metallocenes of many elements have been prepared.

One of the very earliest commercial manufacturers of metallocenes was Arapahoe Chemicals in Boulder, Colorado

== Definition ==
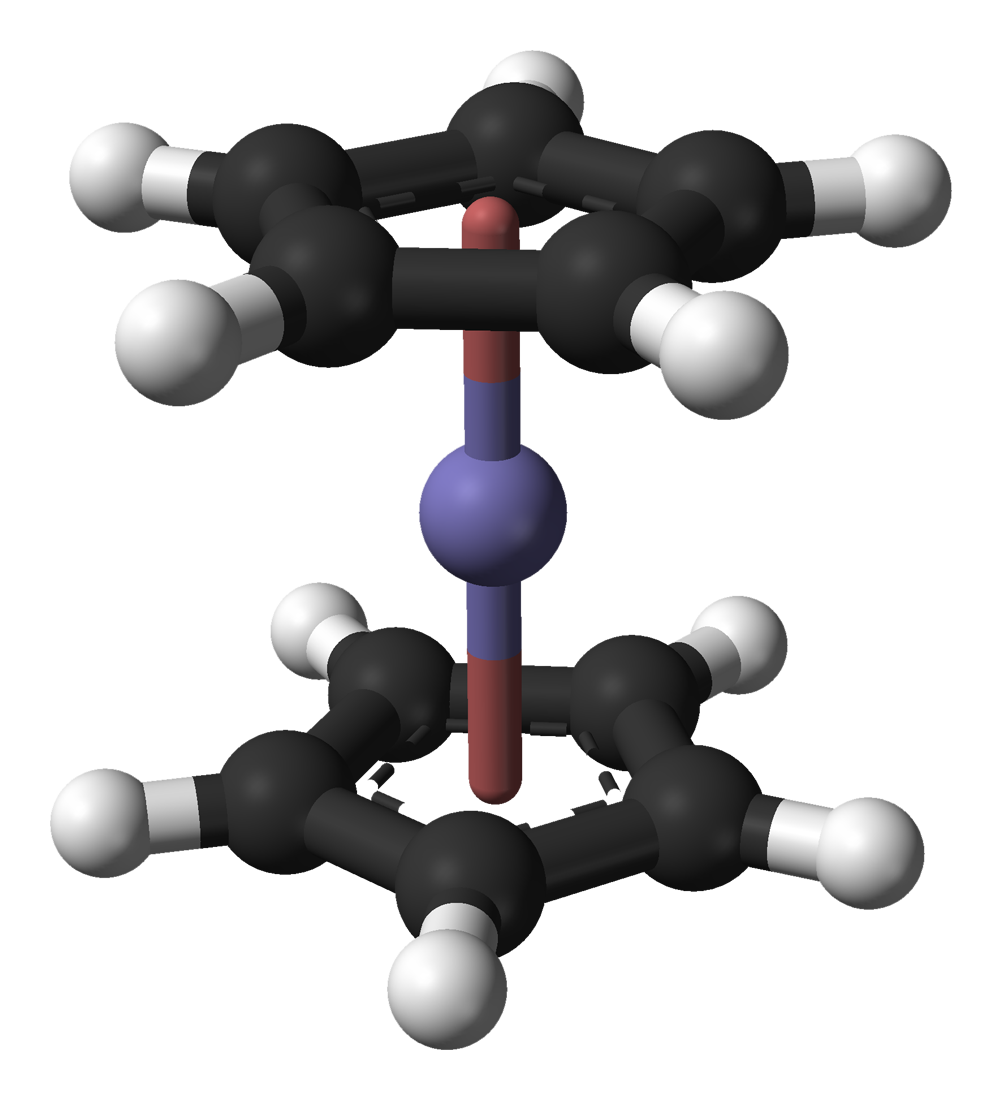
Ball-and-stick model of a metallocene molecule where the cyclopentadienyl anions are in a staggered conformation. The purple ball in the middle represents the metal cation.

The general name metallocene is derived from ferrocene, (C_{5}H_{5})_{2}Fe or Cp_{2}Fe, systematically named bis(η^{5}-cyclopentadienyl)iron(II). According to the International Union of Pure and Applied Chemistry (IUPAC) definition, a metallocene contains a transition metal and two cyclopentadienyl ligands coordinated in a sandwich structure, i.e., the two cyclopentadienyl anions are on parallel planes with equal bond lengths and strengths. Using the nomenclature of "hapticity", the equivalent bonding of all 5 carbon atoms of a cyclopentadienyl ring is denoted as η^{5}, pronounced "pentahapto".

In metallocene names, the prefix before the -ocene ending indicates what metallic element is between the Cp groups. For example, in ferrocene, iron(II), ferrous iron is present.

=== Possible exception ===
Although not sanctioned by IUPAC, uranocene, with two cyclooctatetraene rings sandwiching a uranium atom is sometimes classified as a metallocene.

Some "metallocene" complexes of actinides have been reported where there are three cyclopentadienyl ligands for a monometallic complex, all three of them bound η^{5}.

In barocene (Cp_{2}Ba) and manganocene, the aromatic rings are not parallel

Titanocene dichloride (Cp_{2}TiCl_{2}) is yet another common violation of the IUPAC guidelines.

== Synthesis ==
Three main routes are normally employed in the formation of these types of compounds:

=== Using a metal salt and cyclopentadienyl reagents ===
Sodium cyclopentadienide (NaCp) is the preferred reagent for these types of reactions. It is most easily obtained by the reaction of molten sodium and dicyclopentadiene. Traditionally, the starting point is the cracking of dicyclopentadiene, the dimer of cyclopentadiene. Cyclopentadiene is deprotonated by strong bases or alkali metals.

MCl_{2} + 2 NaC_{5}H_{5} → (C_{5}H_{5})_{2}M + 2 NaCl (M = V, Cr, Mn, Fe, Co; solvent = THF, DME, NH_{3})
CrCl_{3} + 3 NaC_{5}H_{5} → [(C_{5}H_{5})_{2}Cr] + 1/2 "C_{10}H_{10}" + 3 NaCl

NaCp acts as a reducing agent and a ligand in this reaction.

=== Using a metal and cyclopentadiene ===
This technique provides using metal atoms in the gas phase rather than the solid metal. The highly reactive atoms or molecules are generated at a high temperature under vacuum and brought together with chosen reactants on a cold surface.

M + C_{5}H_{6} → MC_{5}H_{5} + 1/2 H_{2} (M = Li, Na, K)
M + 2 C_{5}H_{6} → [(C_{5}H_{5})_{2}M] + H_{2} (M = Mg, Fe)

=== Using cyclopentadienyl reagents ===
A variety of reagents have been developed that transfer Cp to metals. Once popular was thallium cyclopentadienide. It reacts with metal halides to give thallium chloride, which is poorly soluble, and the cyclopentadienyl complex. Trialkyltin derivatives of Cp^{−} have also been used.

Many other methods have been developed. Chromocene can be prepared from chromium hexacarbonyl by direct reaction with cyclopentadiene in the presence of diethylamine; in this case, the formal deprotonation of the cyclopentadiene is followed by reduction of the resulting protons to hydrogen gas, facilitating the oxidation of the metal centre.

Cr(CO)_{6} + 2 C_{5}H_{6} → Cr(C_{5}H_{5})_{2} + 6 CO + H_{2}

Metallocenes generally have high thermal stability. Ferrocene can be sublimed in air at over 100 °C with no decomposition; metallocenes are generally purified in the laboratory by vacuum sublimation. Industrially, sublimation is not practical so metallocenes are isolated by crystallization or produced as part of a hydrocarbon solution. For Group IV metallocenes, donor solvents like ether or THF are distinctly undesirable for polyolefin catalysis. Charge-neutral metallocenes are soluble in common organic solvents. Alkyl substitution on the metallocene increases the solubility in hydrocarbon solvents.

== Structure ==
A structural trend for the series MCp_{2} involves the variation of the M-C bonds, which elongate as the valence electron count deviates from 18.

M(C_{5}H_{5})_{2}	r_{M–C} (pm)	Valence electron count
Fe	203.3	18
Co	209.6	19
Cr	215.1	16
Ni	218.5	20
V	226	15

In metallocenes of the type (C_{5}H_{5})_{2}M, the cyclopentadienyl rings rotate with very low barriers. Single crystal X-ray diffraction studies reveal both eclipsed or staggered rotamers. For non-substituted metallocenes the energy difference between the staggered and eclipsed conformations is only a few kJ/mol. Crystals of ferrocene and osmocene exhibit eclipsed conformations at low temperatures, whereas in the related bis(pentamethylcyclopentadienyl) complexes the rings usually crystallize in a staggered conformation, apparently to minimize steric hindrance between the methyl groups.

== Spectroscopic properties ==
=== Vibrational (infrared and Raman) spectroscopy of metallocenes ===
Infrared and Raman spectroscopies have proved to be important in the analysis of cyclic polyenyl metal sandwich species, with particular use in elucidating covalent or ionic M–ring bonds and distinguishing between central and coordinated rings. Some typical spectral bands and assignments of iron group metallocenes are shown in the following table:

Spectral frequencies of group 8 metallocenes
	Ferrocene (cm^{−1})	Ruthenocene (cm^{−1})	Osmocene (cm^{−1})
C–H stretch	3085	3100	3095
C–C stretch	1411	1413	1405
Ring deformation	1108	1103	1096
C–H deformation	1002	1002	995
C–H out-of-plane bend	811	806	819
Ring tilt	492	528	428
M–ring stretch	478	446	353
M–ring bend	170	185	–

=== NMR (^{1}H and ^{13}C) spectroscopy of metallocenes ===
Nuclear magnetic resonance (NMR) is the most applied tool in the study of metal sandwich compounds and organometallic species, giving information on nuclear structures in solution, as liquids, gases, and in the solid state. ^{1}H NMR chemical shifts for paramagnetic organotransition-metal compounds is usually observed between 25 and 40 ppm, but this range is much more narrow for diamagnetic metallocene complexes, with chemical shifts usually observed between 3 and 7 ppm.

=== Mass spectrometry of metallocenes ===
Mass spectrometry of metallocene complexes has been very well studied and the effect of the metal on the fragmentation of the organic moiety has received considerable attention and the identification of metal-containing fragments is often facilitated by the isotope distribution of the metal. The three major fragments observed in mass spectrometry are the molecular ion peak, [C_{10}H_{10}M]^{+}, and fragment ions, [C_{5}H_{5}M]^{+} and M^{+}.

== Derivatives ==
After the discovery of ferrocene, the synthesis and characterization of derivatives of metallocene and other sandwich compounds attracted researchers’ interests.

=== Metallocenophanes ===
Metallocenophanes feature linking of the cyclopentadienyl or polyarenyl rings by the introduction of one or more heteroannular bridges. Some of these compounds undergo thermal ring-opening polymerizations to give soluble high molecular weight polymers with transition metals in the polymer backbone. Ansa-metallocenes are derivatives of metallocenes with an intramolecular bridge between the two cyclopentadienyl rings.

=== Polynuclear and heterobimetallic metallocenes ===
- Ferrocene derivatives: biferrocenophanes have been studied for their mixed valence properties. Upon one-electron oxidation of a compound with two or more equivalent ferrocene moieties, the electron vacancy could be localized on one ferrocene unit or completely delocalized.
- Ruthenocene derivatives: in the solid state biruthenocene is disordered and adopts the transoid conformation with the mutual orientation of Cp rings depending on the intermolecular interactions.
- Vanadocene and rhodocene derivatives: vanadocene complexes have been used as starting materials for the synthesis of heterobimetallic complexes. The 18 valence electron ions [Cp_{2}Rh]^{+} are very stable, unlike the neutral monomers Cp_{2}Rh which dimerize immediately at room temperature and they have been observed in matrix isolation.

=== Multi-decker sandwich compounds ===
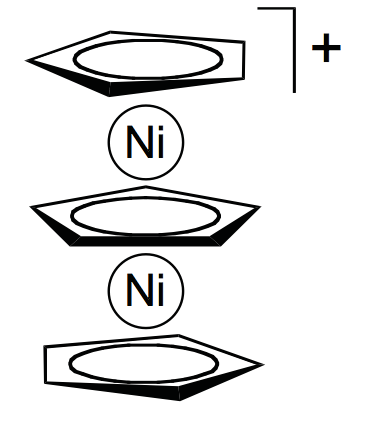
Nickel triple-decker sandwich complex

Triple-decker complexes are composed of three Cp anions and two metal cations in alternating order. The first triple-decker sandwich complex, [Ni_{2}Cp_{3}]^{+}, was reported in 1972. Many examples have been reported subsequently, often with boron-containing rings.

=== Metallocenium ions ===
The most famous example is ferrocenium, [Fe(C_{5}H_{5})_{2}]^{+}, the blue iron(III) complex derived from oxidation of orange iron(II) ferrocene. The lithocene anion, [Li(C_{5}H_{5})_{2}]^{−}, is the best-documented example of a metallocene anion; otherwise such ions are little known.

== Applications ==
Many derivatives of early metal metallocenes are active catalysts for olefin polymerization. Unlike traditional and still dominant heterogeneous Ziegler–Natta catalysts, metallocene catalysts are homogeneous. Early metal metallocene derivatives, e.g. Tebbe's reagent, Petasis reagent, and Schwartz's reagent are useful in specialized organic synthetic operations.

=== Potential applications ===
The ferrocene/ferrocenium biosensor has been discussed for determining the levels of glucose in a sample electrochemically through a series of connected redox cycles.

Metallocene dihalides [Cp_{2}MX_{2}] (M = Ti, Mo, Nb) exhibit anti-tumor properties, although none have proceeded far in clinical trials.

== See also ==
- Actinocenes – Class of chemical compounds
- f-block metallocene – Class of organometallic sandwich compounds
- Jemmis mno rules
