= Ernst Otto Fischer =

German chemist (1918-2007)

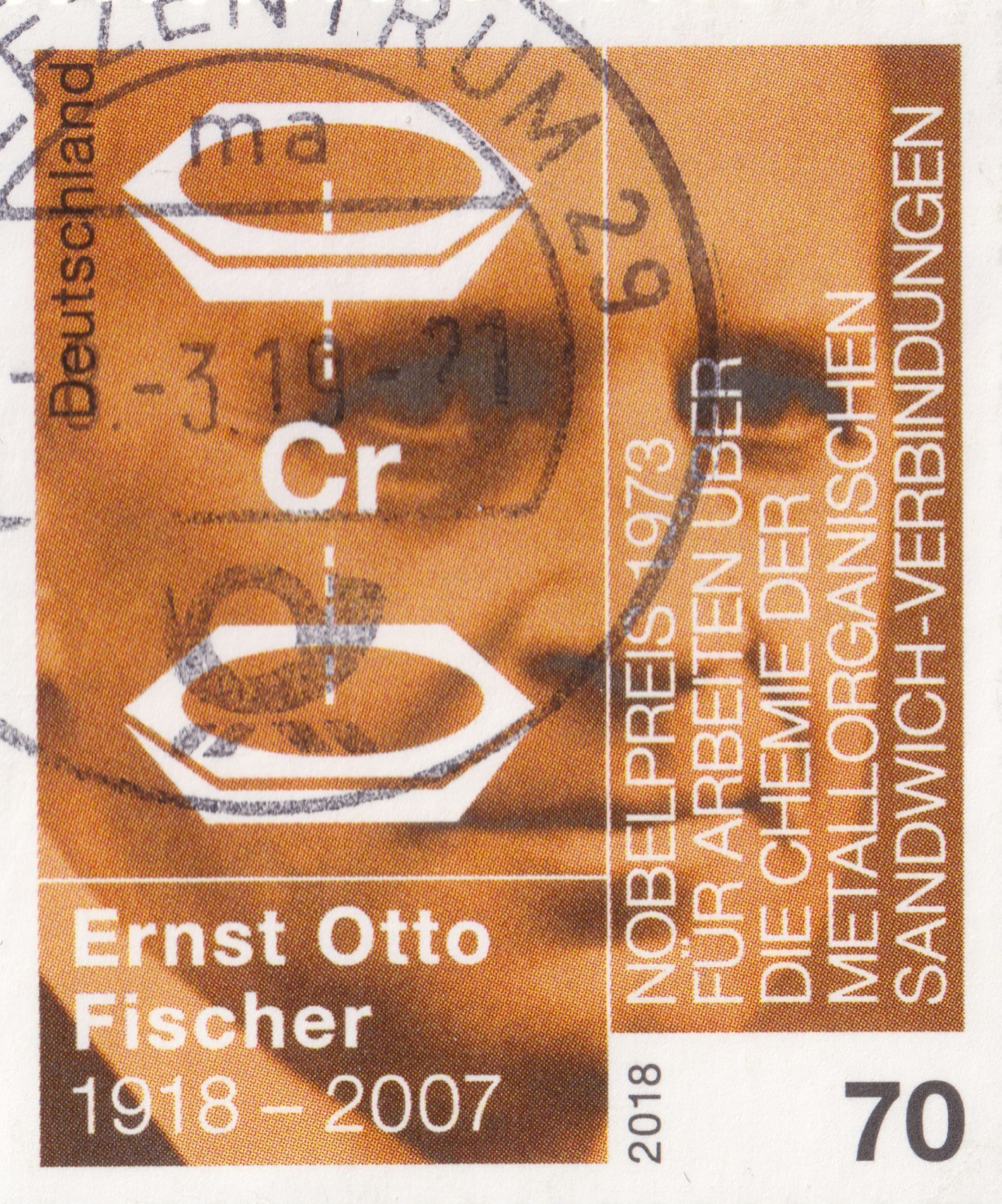
- Fischer's portrait on a commemorative Deutsche Post stamp, 2018
- Born: 10 November 1918; Solln (near Munich), People's State of Bavaria
- Died: 23 July 2007 (aged 88); Munich, Germany
- Education: Technical University of Munich
- Known for: Organometallic compounds Ferrocene; Osmocene; Sandwich compounds Fischer carbene Fischer–Hafner synthesis
- Awards: Nobel Prize for Chemistry (1973)
- Scientific career
- Fields: Chemistry
- Workplaces: Technical University of Munich
- Doctoral advisor: Walter Hieber

Ernst Otto Fischer (German pronunciation: [ˈɛʁnst ˌɔto ˈfɪʃɐ]; 10 November 1918 – 23 July 2007) was a German chemist who won the Nobel Prize for pioneering work in the area of organometallic chemistry.

== Early life ==
He was born in Solln, a borough of Munich. His parents were Karl T. Fischer, Professor of Physics at the Technical University of Munich (TUM), and Valentine née Danzer. He graduated in 1937 with Abitur. Before the completion of two years' compulsory military service, the Second World War broke out, and he served in Poland, France, and Russia. During a period of study leave, towards the end of 1941 he began to study chemistry at the Technical University of Munich. Following the end of the War, he was released by the Americans in the autumn of 1945 and resumed his studies.

== Training ==
Fischer graduated from TUM in 1949. He then started his doctoral thesis as an assistant to Professor Walter Hieber in the Inorganic Chemistry Institute, His thesis was entitled "The Mechanisms of Carbon Monoxide Reactions of Nickel(II) Salts in the Presence of Dithionites and Sulfoxylates".

== Research career ==
After receiving his doctorate in 1952, he remained at TUM. He continued his research on the organometallic chemistry of the transition metal. He almost immediately challenged the structure for ferrocene as postulated by Pauson and Keally. Shortly thereafter, he published the structural data of ferrocene and the new complexes nickelocene and cobaltocene. Near the same time, he focused also on the then baffling chemistry resulting from Hein's reactions of chromium(III) chloride with phenylmagnesium bromide. This effort resulted in his isolation of bis(benzene)chromium, foretelling an entirely new class of sandwich complexes.

== Professional advances and recognition ==
He was appointed a lecturer at the TUM in 1955 and, in 1957, professor and then, in 1959, C4 professor. In 1964, he took the Chair of Inorganic Chemistry at the TUM.

In 1964, he was elected a member of the Mathematics/Natural Science section of the Bavarian Academy of Sciences. In 1969, he was appointed a member of the German Academy of Natural Scientists, Leopoldina and in 1972 was given an honorary doctorate by the Faculty of Chemistry and Pharmacy at LMU Munich.

He lectured across the world on metal complexes of cyclopentadienyl, indenyl, arenes, olefins, and metal carbonyls. In the 1960s his group discovered a metal alkylidene and alkylidyne complexes, since referred to as Fischer carbenes and Fischer-carbynes. Overall he published about 450 journal articles, and he trained many PhD and postdoctoral students, many of whom went on to noteworthy careers. Among his many foreign lectureships, he was Firestone Lecturer at the University of Wisconsin–Madison (1969), visiting professor at the University of Florida (1971), and Arthur D. Little visiting professor at the Massachusetts Institute of Technology (1973).

He has received many awards including, in 1973 with Geoffrey Wilkinson, the Nobel Prize in Chemistry for his work on organometallic compounds.

== Death ==
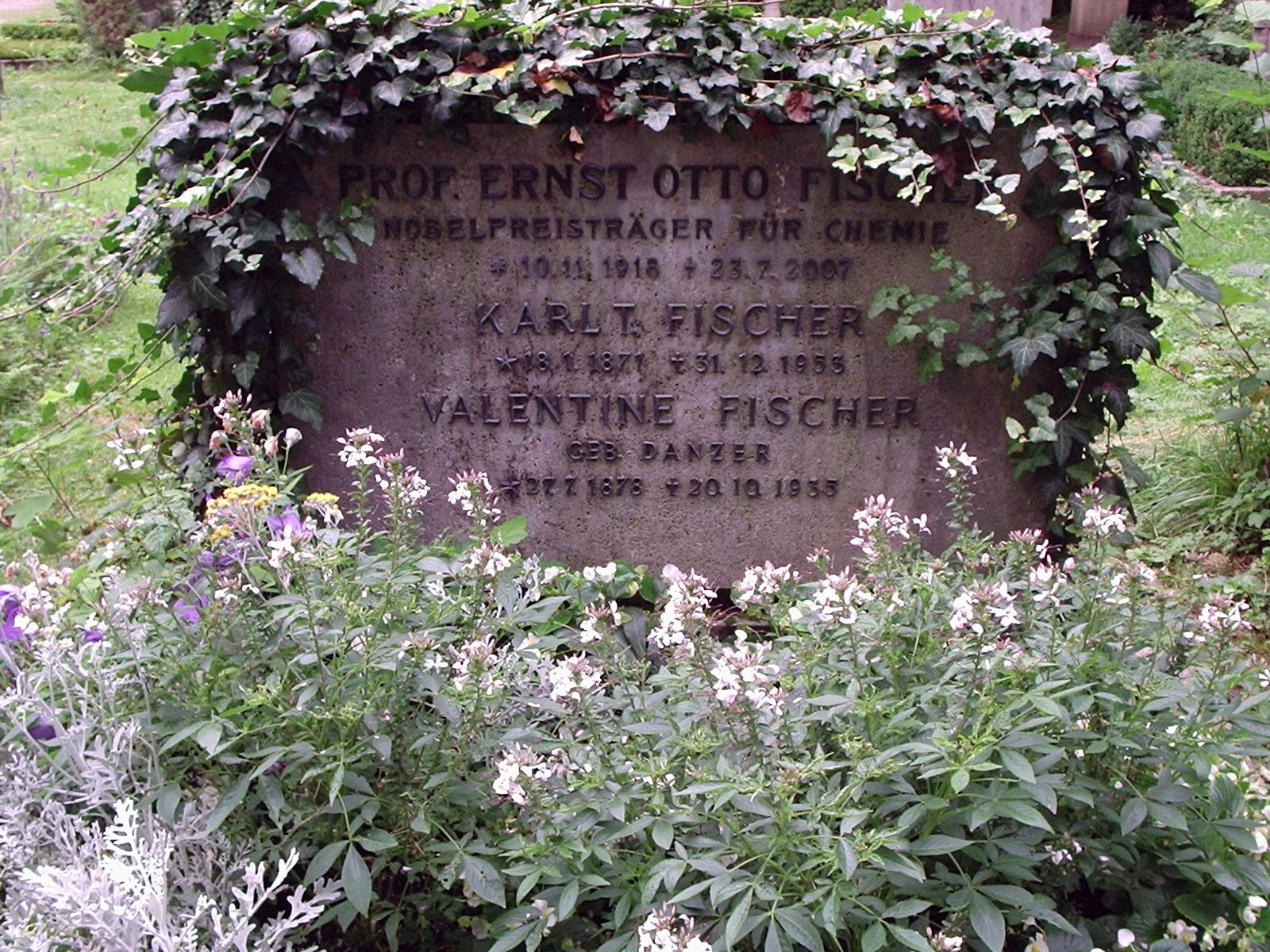
Tomb of Ernst Otto Fischer

He died on 23 July 2007 in Munich. At the time of his death, Fischer was the oldest living German Nobel laureate. He was succeeded by Manfred Eigen, who shared the Nobel Prize in Chemistry in 1967 and is nine years younger than Fischer was.

== See also ==
- Organochromium chemistry
- Organouranium chemistry
- Chromocene
- Metallocene
- Osmocene
- Rhodocene
- Sandwich compound
