= (Benzene)chromium tricarbonyl =

(Benzene)chromium(0) tricarbonyl

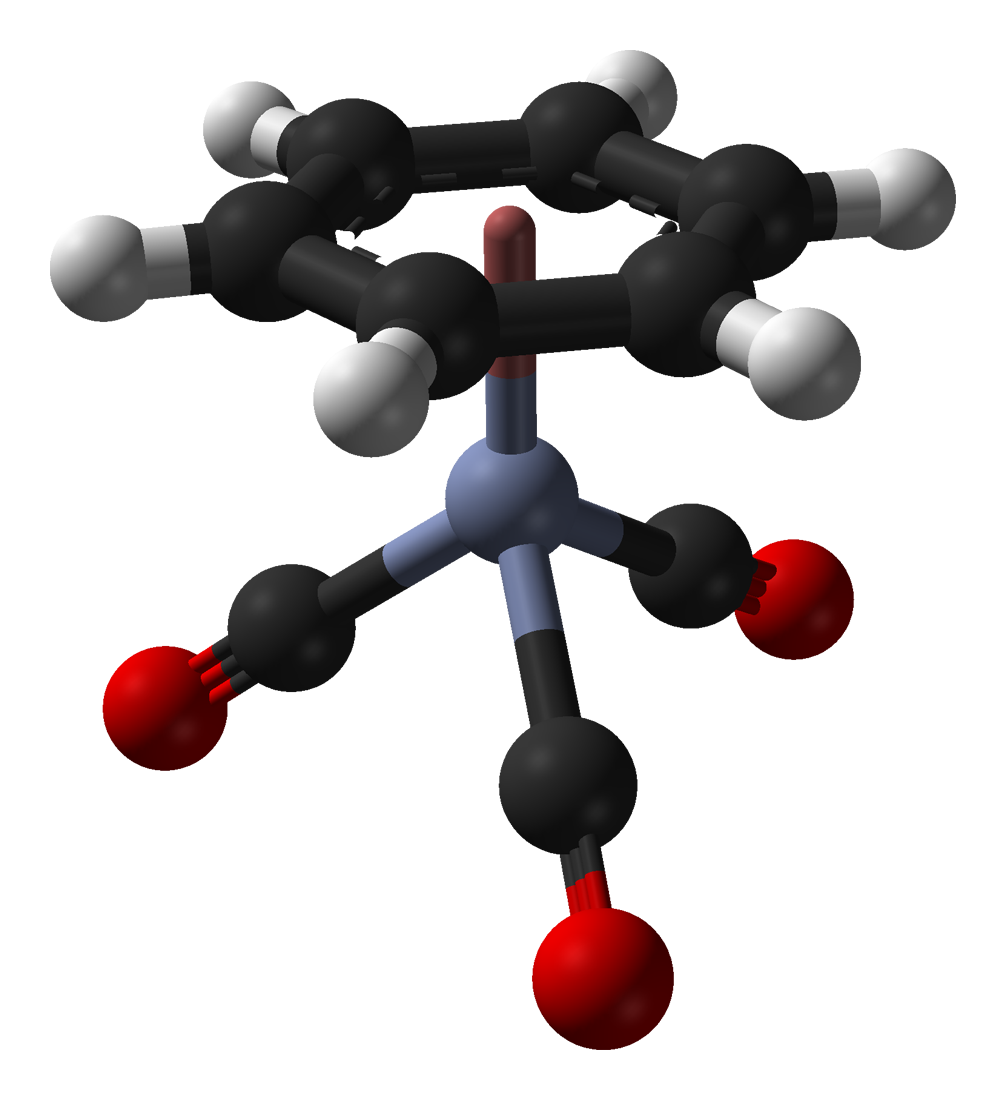

Names
- IUPAC name (benzene)tricarbonylchromium
- Other names benzene tricarbonyl chromium, (benzene)chromium tricarbonyl, Benchrotrene, pi-benzenetricarbonylchromium

Identifiers
CAS Number	12082-08-5
3D model (JSmol)	Interactive image
ChemSpider	9130108
ECHA InfoCard	100.031.939
EC Number	235-146-6
PubChem CID	10954891
- InChI: InChI=1S/C6H6.3CO.Cr/c1-2-4-6-5-3-1;3*1-2;/h1-6H;;;; Key: WVSBQYMJNMJHIM-UHFFFAOYSA-N; InChI=1/C6H6.3CO.Cr/c1-2-4-6-5-3-1;3*1-2;/h1-6H;;;; Key: WVSBQYMJNMJHIM-UHFFFAOYAR
- SMILES: [Cr].[O+]#[C-].[O+]#[C-].[O+]#[C-].c1ccccc1

Properties
Chemical formula	Cr(C_{6}H_{6})(CO)_{3}
Molar mass	214.14 g/mol
Appearance	solid yellow crystals
Melting point	163 to 166 °C (325 to 331 °F; 436 to 439 K)
Solubility in water	nonsoluble
Solubility	THF, ether, benzene

Structure
Coordination geometry	tetrahedral, "piano stool"

Hazards
- Occupational safety and health (OHS/OSH)
Main hazards	Harmful through inhalation, contact with skin, or swallowed
- GHS labelling
Pictograms	(GHS07: Exclamation mark)
Signal word	Warning
Hazard statements	H302, H312, H332
Precautionary statements	P261, P264, P270, P271, P280, P301+P312, P302+P352, P304+P312, P304+P340, P312, P322, P330, P363, P501
- Except where otherwise noted, data are given for materials in their standard state (at 25 °C [77 °F], 100 kPa). verify (what is ?) Infobox references

(Benzene)chromium tricarbonyl is an organometallic compound with the formula Cr(C_{6}H_{6})(CO)_{3}. This yellow crystalline solid compound is soluble in common nonpolar organic solvents. The molecule adopts a geometry known as "piano stool" because of the planar arrangement of the aryl group and the presence of three CO ligands as "legs" on the chromium-bond axis.

== Preparation ==
(Benzene)tricarbonylchromium was first reported in 1957 by Fischer and Öfele, who prepared the compound by the carbonylation of bis(benzene)chromium. They obtained mainly chromium carbonyl (Cr(CO)_{6}) and traces of Cr(C_{6}H_{6})(CO)_{3}. The synthesis was optimized through the reaction of Cr(CO)_{6} and Cr(C_{6}H_{6})_{2}. For commercial purposes, a reaction of Cr(CO)_{6} and benzene is used:

Cr(CO)_{6} + C_{6}H_{6} → Cr(C_{6}H_{6})(CO)_{3} + 3 CO

== Reactions ==
Complexes of the type (Arene)Cr(CO)_{3} have been well investigated as reagents in organic synthesis. The aromatic ring of (benzene)tricarbonylchromium is substantially more electrophilic than benzene itself, allowing it to undergo nucleophilic addition reactions.

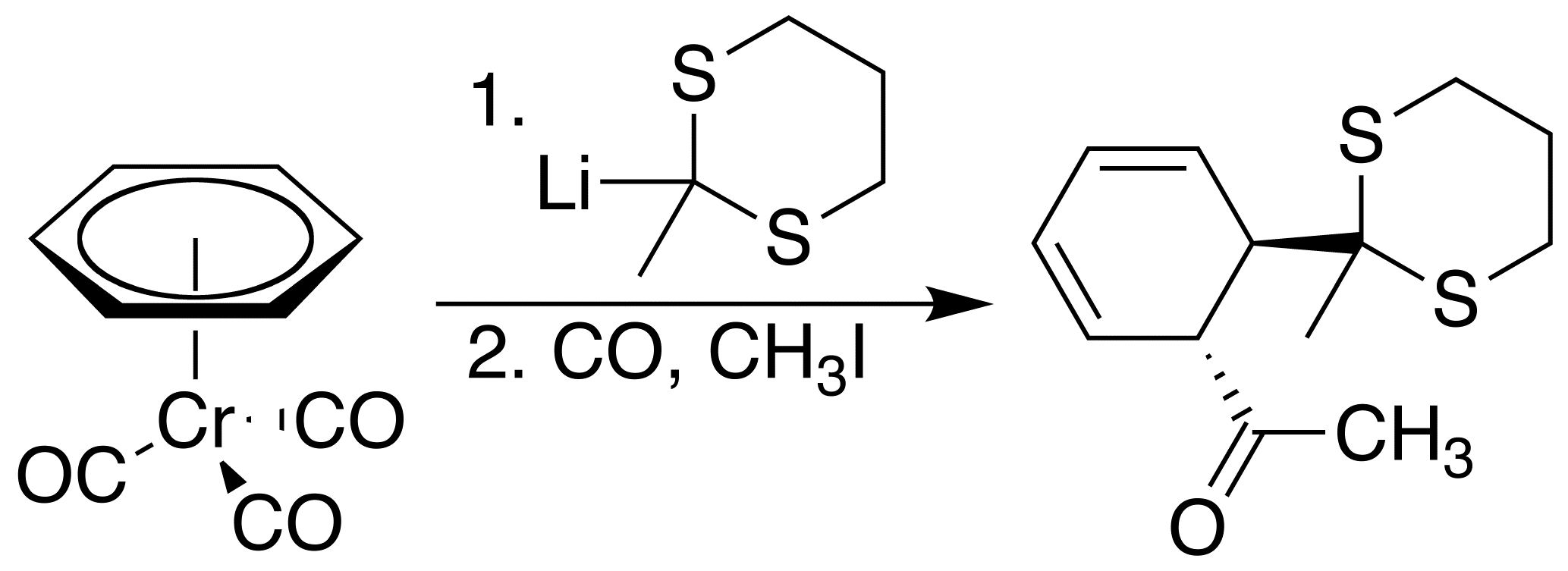

It is also more acidic, undergoing lithiation upon treatment with n-butyllithium. The resulting organolithium compound can then be used as a nucleophile in various reactions, for example, with trimethylsilyl chloride:

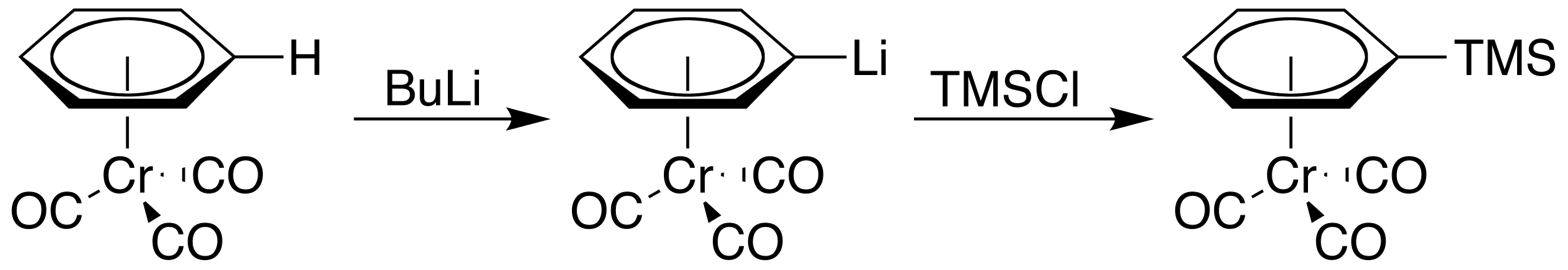

(Benzene)tricarbonylchromium is a useful catalyst for the hydrogenation of 1,3-dienes. The product alkene results from 1,4-addition of hydrogen. The complex does not hydrogenate isolated double bonds.

(Arene)Cr(CO)_{3} compounds undergo ligand exchange both thermally and photochemically: the arene is thermally labile, whereas the carbonyls are photolytically so.
