= Osmocene =

Names
- Preferred IUPAC name Osmocene
- Other names: Di(cyclopentadienyl)osmium; Bis(η^{5}-cyclopentadienyl)osmium

Identifiers
CAS Number	1273-81-0
3D model (JSmol)	Interactive image
ChemSpider	71493
ECHA InfoCard	100.013.687
PubChem CID	6432038
CompTox Dashboard (EPA)	DTXSID00925840
- InChI: InChI=1S/2C5H5.Os/c2*1-2-4-5-3-1;/h2*1-5H;/q2*-1;+2 Key: RMYKEUKAFJLONI-UHFFFAOYSA-N; InChI=1/2C5H5.Os/c2*1-2-4-5-3-1;/h2*1-5H;/q2*-1;+2 Key: RMYKEUKAFJLONI-UHFFFAOYAC
- SMILES: [cH-]1cccc1.[cH-]1cccc1.[Os+2]

Properties
Chemical formula	C_{10}H_{10}Os
Molar mass	320.42 g·mol^{−1}
Appearance	white solid
Melting point	234 °C
Boiling point	298 °C

Structure
Crystal structure	orthorhombic
Space group	Pnma, No. 62
Point group	D_{5h}

Related compounds
Related compounds	ferrocene, ruthenocene
- Except where otherwise noted, data are given for materials in their standard state (at 25 °C [77 °F], 100 kPa). verify (what is ?) Infobox references

Osmocene is an organoosmium compound found as a white solid. It is a metallocene with the formula Os(C_{5}H_{5})_{2}.

== Synthesis ==
Osmocene is commercially available. It may be prepared by the reaction of osmium tetroxide with hydrobromic acid followed by zinc and cyclopentadiene.

It was first synthesized by Ernst Otto Fischer and Heinrich Grumbert via the reaction of osmium(IV) chloride with excess sodium cyclopentadienide in dimethoxyethane, where osmium(II) chloride is presumed to be an intermediate formed in situ. Alternatively, cyclopentadienyl magnesium bromide could be reacted with osmium(IV) chloride, though this has worse yields.

== Properties ==
Osmocene is a white solid. The molecular structure features an osmium ion sandwiched between two cyclopentadienyl rings. It is isomorphous to the lighter homologue ruthenocene, both crystallizing in an eclipsed conformation. This is in contrast to ferrocene, which crystallizes with its rings staggered.

Compared to ferrocene and ruthenocene, osmocene is less reactive towards electrophilic aromatic substitution but has the greatest tendency towards adduct formation with Lewis acids.

The osmocenium cation [Os(C_{5}H_{5})_{2}]^{+} dimerizes, forming a binuclear complex with an Os-Os bond. In contrast, the decamethylosmocenium cation [Os(C_{5}(CH_{3})_{5})_{2}]^{+} is stable as the monomer.

== Uses ==
In 2009, Horst Kunkely and Arnd Vogler reported the possibility of photocatalytic water splitting with osmocene as a catalyst.
