= Sandwich compound =

Chemical compound made of two ring ligands bound to a metal

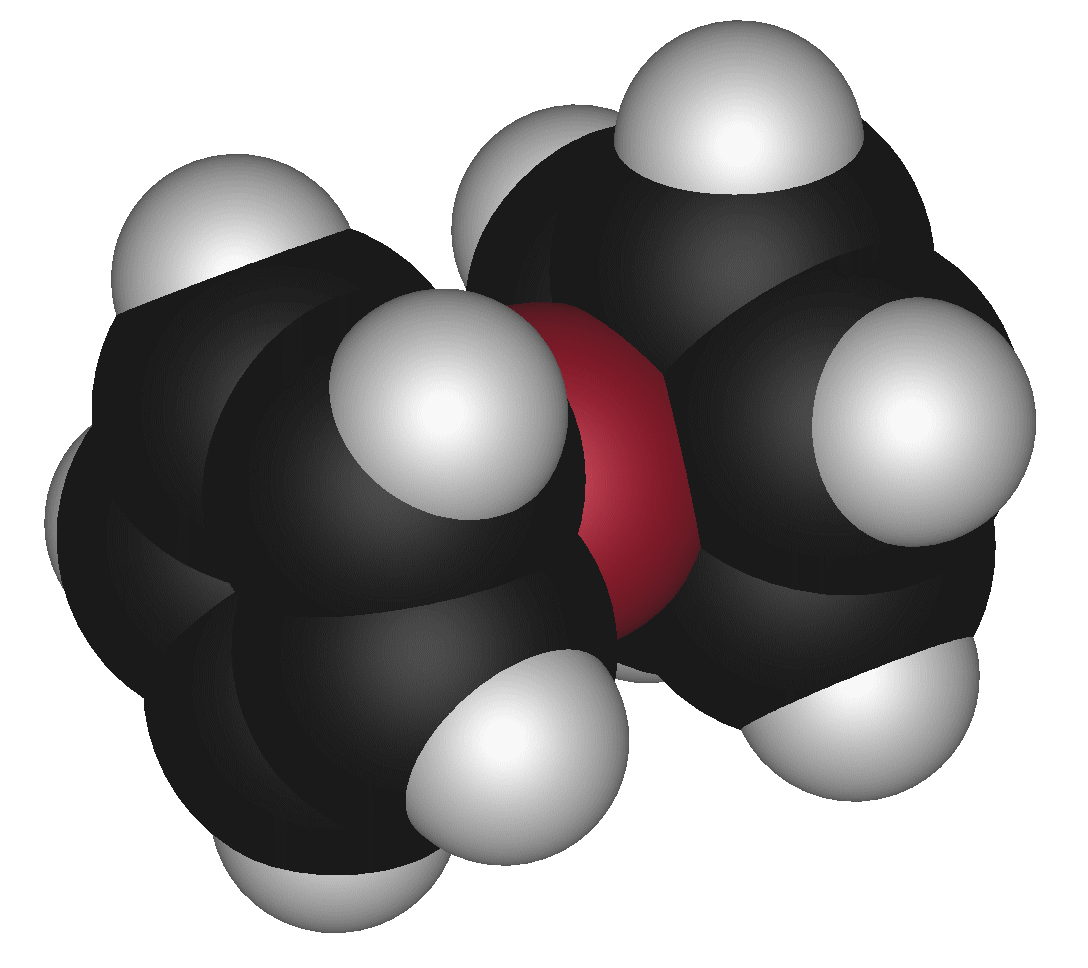
Space-filling model of ferrocene, the archetypal sandwich compound

In organometallic chemistry, a sandwich compound is a chemical compound featuring a metal bound by haptic, covalent bonds to two arene (ring) ligands. The arenes have the formula C_{n}H_{n}, substituted derivatives (for example C_{n}(CH_{3})_{n}) and heterocyclic derivatives (for example BC_{n}H_{n+1}). Because the metal is usually situated between the two rings, it is said to be "sandwiched". A special class of sandwich complexes are the metallocenes.

The term sandwich compound was introduced in organometallic nomenclature in 1956 in a report by J. D. Dunitz, L. E. Orgel and R. A. Rich, who confirmed the structure of ferrocene by X-ray crystallography. The correct structure, in which the molecule features an iron atom sandwiched between two parallel cyclopentadienyl rings, had been proposed several years previously by Robert Burns Woodward and, separately, by Ernst Otto Fischer. The structure helped explain puzzles about ferrocene's conformers. This result further demonstrated the power of X-ray crystallography and accelerated the growth of organometallic chemistry.

== Classes ==
(Cycloheptatrienyl)(cyclopentadienyl)titanium (troticene) is an unsymmetrical sandwich complex.

The best known members are the metallocenes of the formula M(C_{5}H_{5})_{2} where M = Cr, Fe, Co, Ni, Pb, Zr, Ru, Rh, Os, Sm, Ti, V, Mo, W, Zn. These species are also called bis(cyclopentadienyl)metal complexes. Other arenes can serve as ligands as well.

- Mixed cyclopentadienyl complexes: M(C_{5}H_{5})(C_{n}H_{n}). Some examples are Ti(C_{5}H_{5})(C_{7}H_{7}) and (C_{_{60}})Fe(C_{5}H_{5}Ph_{5}) where the fullerene ligand is acting as a cyclopentadienyl analogue.
- Bis(benzene) complexes: M(C_{6}H_{6})_{2}, the best known example being bis(benzene)chromium.
- Bis(cyclooctatetraene) complexes: M(C_{8}H_{8})_{2}, such as U(C_{8}H_{8})_{2} and Th(C_{8}H_{8})_{2} (both actinocenes).
- Metal–carborane complexes (metallacarboranes), a very large and diverse family in which main-group or transition metal ions are coordinated to carborane ligands to form polyhedral cages ranging in size from 6 to 15 vertices. Examples include bis(dicarbollide) complexes, such as [M(C_{2}B_{9}H_{11})_{2}]^{z−} and [Fe(C_{2}B_{9}H_{11})_{2}]^{2−}, and small-carborane sandwiches such as (R_{2}C_{2}B_{3}H_{5})M(C_{2}B_{4}H_{6}) and (R_{5}C_{5})M(R′_{2})C_{2}B_{4}H_{4}) where M is a transition metal and R and R′ are methyl or ethyl.

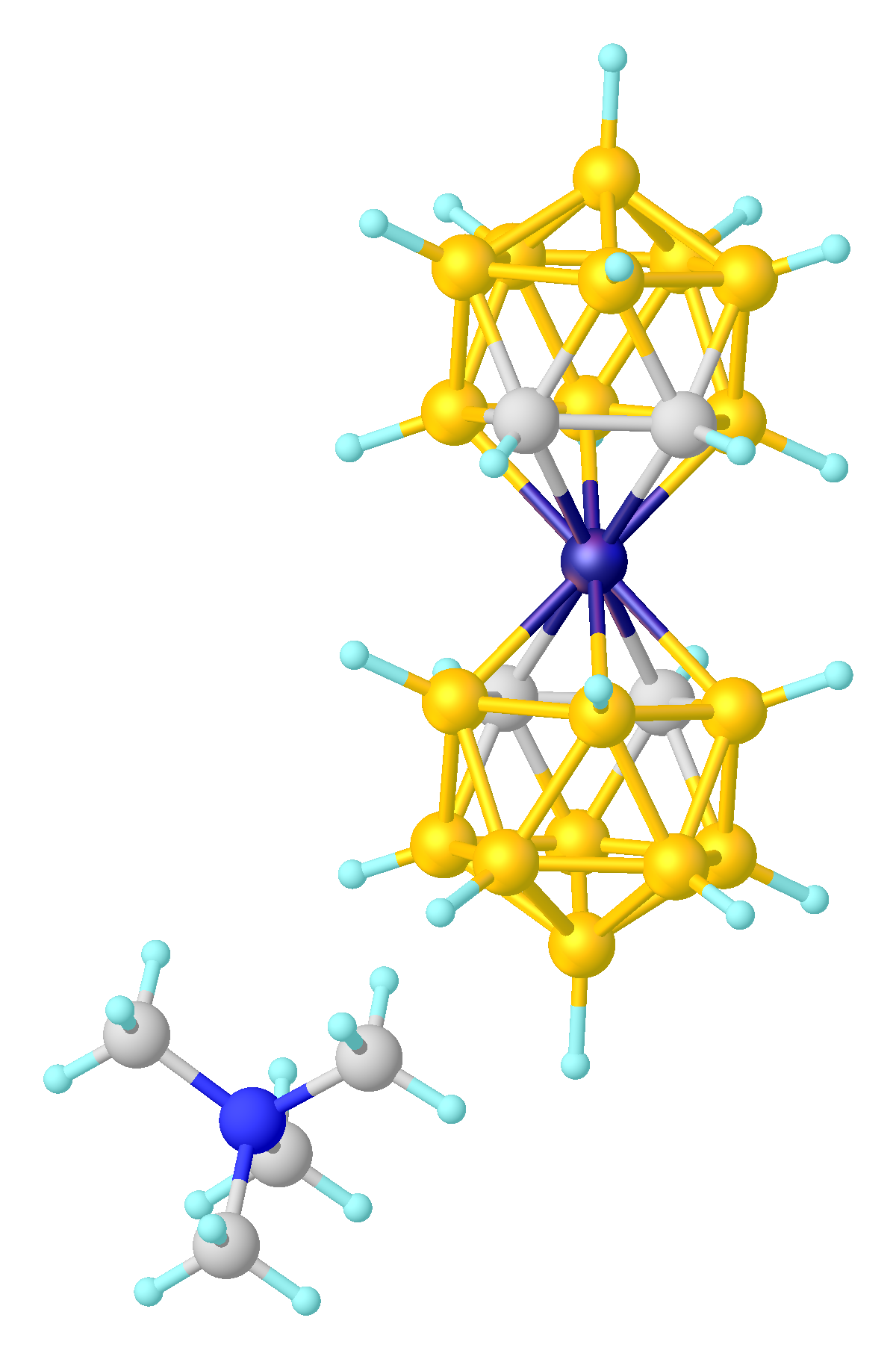
Structure of (Me_{4}N^{+})_{2}[Fe(C_{2}B_{9}H_{11})_{2}]^{+}, showing only one Me_{4}N^{+}.

Closely related are the metal complexes containing H_{3}C_{3}B_{2}R_{2} (diborolyl) ligands. In addition to these, other sandwich complexes containing purely inorganic ligands are known, such as [Cu(B_{11}H_{11})_{2}]^{3−}, Fe(C_{5}Me_{5})(P_{5}) and [(P_{5})_{2}Ti]^{2−}.

=== Half-sandwich compounds ===
Half sandwich complexes have only one facially-bound planar organic ligand instead of two gives rise to a still larger family of half-sandwich compounds. One well studied example is probably methylcyclopentadienyl manganese tricarbonyl. Such species are occasionally referred to as piano-stool compounds, at least when there are three diatomic ligands. In such cases, the facially-bound planar organic ligand comprises the "seat" of the piano stool.

=== Multidecker sandwiches ===
The first isolated multidecker sandwich was the tris(cyclopentadienyl)dinickel triple-decker complex [Ni_{2}Cp_{3}]BF_{4}, a highly air- and water-sensitive compound reported in 1972, with X-ray crystallographic confirmation in 1974.

In 1973 the electrically neutral air-stable triple-decker cobaltacarborane sandwiches 1,7,2,3- and 1,7,2,4-CpCo(RHC_{2}B_{3}H_{3})Cp (where R = H, Me) were isolated and characterized by multinuclear NMR and X-ray studies (the structure of the 1,7,2,3 isomer is shown).

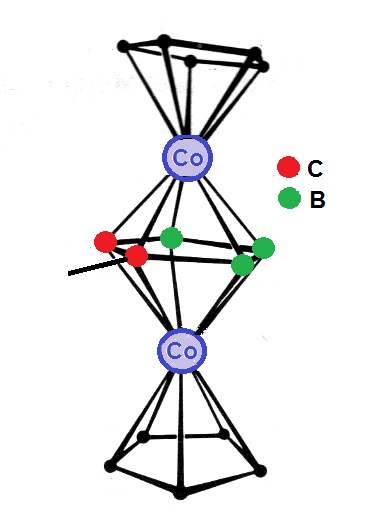
1,7,2,3-CpCo(MeC_{2}B_{3}H_{4})CoCp, the first structurally confirmed multidecker sandwich.

Since then many three-, four-, five-, and six-decker sandwich complexes have been described. The largest structurally characterized multidecker sandwich monomer is the hexadecker shown at lower right.

A structurally characterized cobaltacarborane hexadecker.

An extensive family of multidecker sandwiches incorporating planar (R_{2}R′C_{3}B_{2}R″_{2})^{3−} (diborolyl) ligands has also been prepared.

Numerous multidecker sandwich compounds featuring hydrocarbon bridging rings have also been prepared, especially triple deckers. A versatile method involves the attachment of Cp*Ru^{+} to preformed sandwich complexes.

=== Linked sandwiches ===
Monomeric double-decker and multidecker sandwiches have been used as building blocks for extended systems, some of which exhibit electron delocalization between metal centers. An example of a cyclic poly(metallacarborane) complex is the octahedral "carbon-wired" system shown below, which contains a planar C_{16}B_{8} macrocycle.

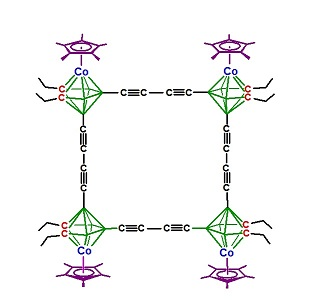

=== Inverse sandwiches ===
In these anti-bimetallic compounds, the metals are found to be bridged by a single carbocyclic ring. Examples include [(THF)_{3}Ca]_{2}(_{1},_{3},_{5}-triphenylbenzene) and [(Ar)Sn]_{2}COT.

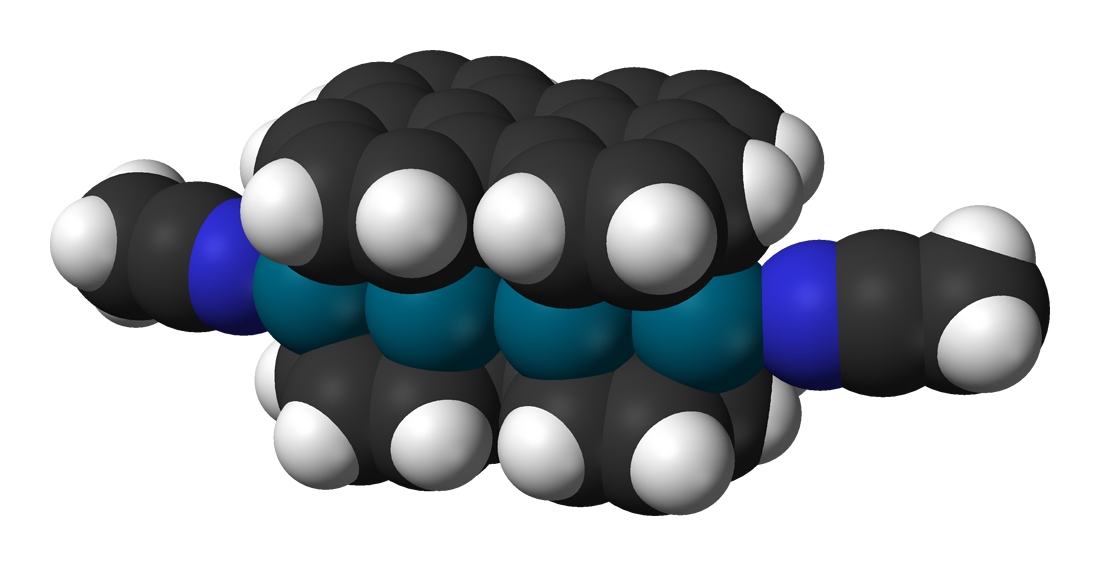
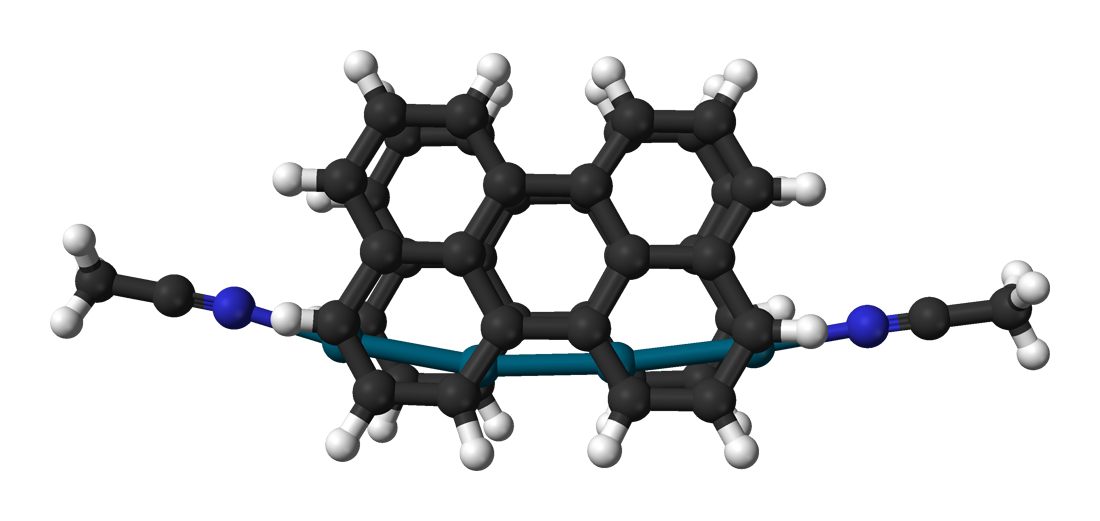
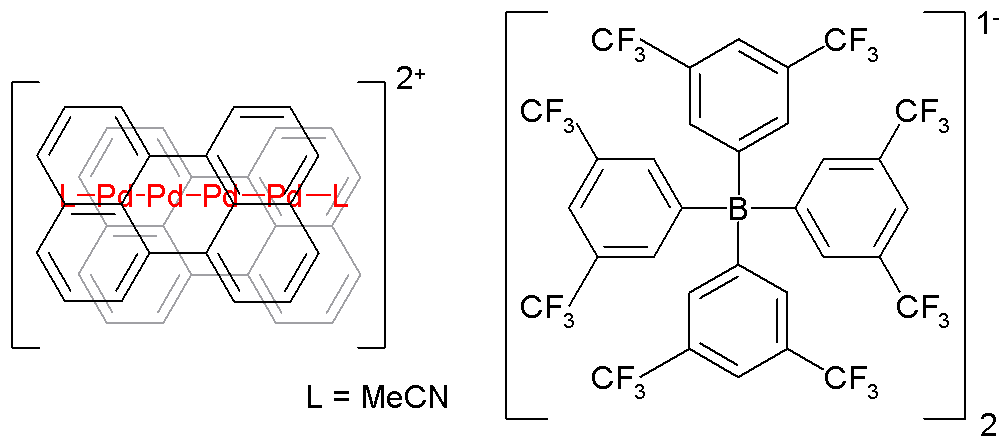
Perylene–tetrapalladium sandwich complex

=== Double- and multimetallic sandwich compounds ===
Another family of sandwich compound involves more than one metal sandwiched between two carbocyclic rings. Examples of the double sandwich include V_{2}(indenyl)_{2}, Ni_{2}(COT)_{2} and Cr_{2}(pentalene)_{2}. Depicted at right is an example of a multimetallic sandwich compound, which has four palladium atoms joined in a chain sandwiched between two perylene units. The counterions are bulky tetraarylborates.

== Applications ==
Ferrocene and methylcyclopentadienyl manganese tricarbonyl have been used as antiknock agents. Certain bent metallocenes of zirconium and hafnium are effective precatalysts for the polymerization of propylene. Many half sandwich complexes of ruthenium, such as those derived from (cymene)ruthenium dichloride dimer catalyse transfer hydrogenation, a useful reaction in organic synthesis.

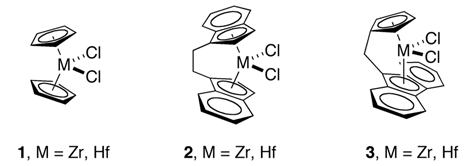

Ferrocene derivatives have also been used as photoinitiators in cationic polymerization.
