= Rosenthal's reagent =

Structure of Rosenthal's reagent with titanium and zirconium.

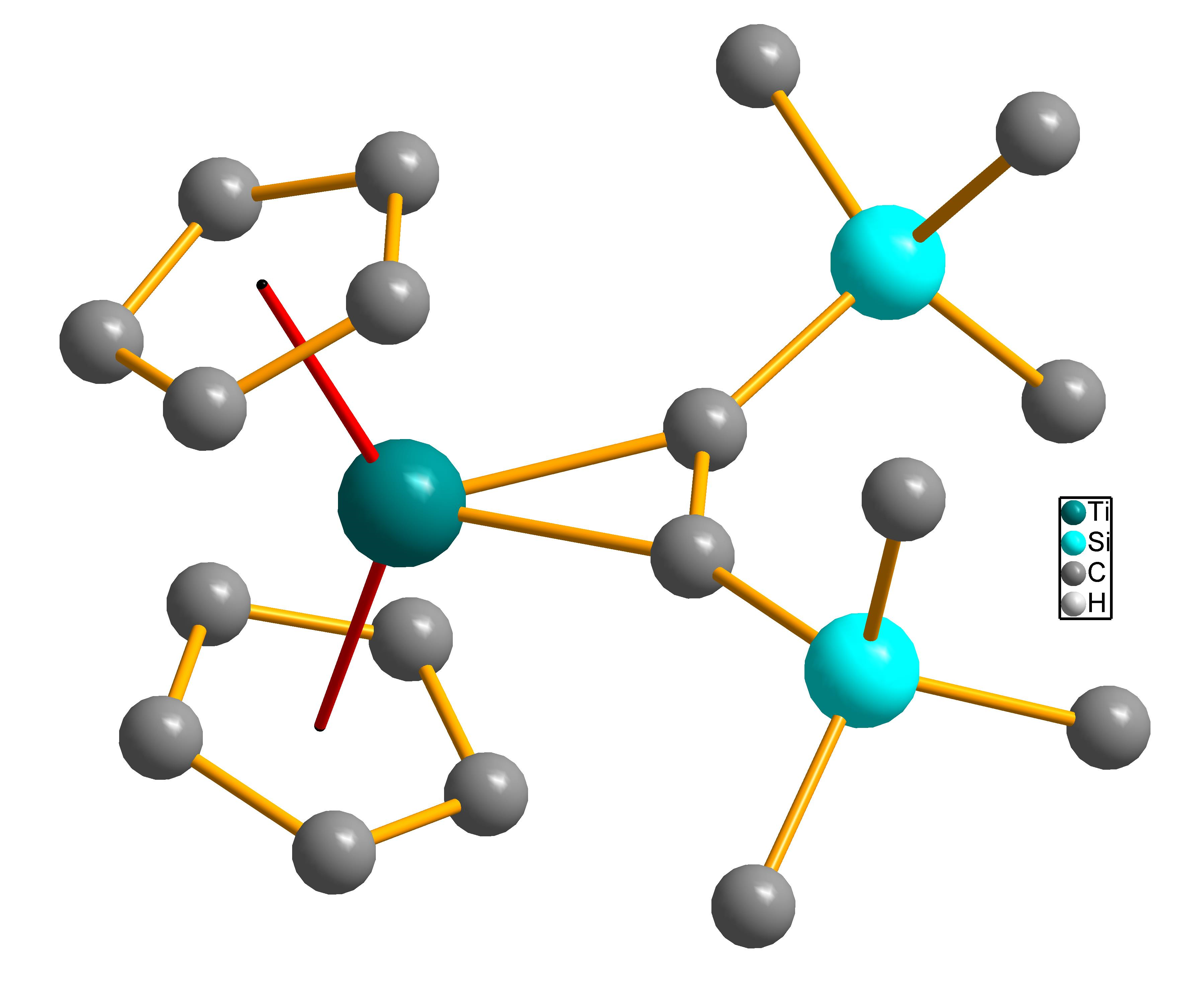
Molecular structure of Titanocene-bis(trimethylsilyl)acetylene

Rosenthal's reagent is a metallocene bis(trimethylsilyl)acetylene complex with zirconium (Cp_{2}Zr) or titanium (Cp_{2}Ti) used as central atom of the metallocene fragment Cp_{2}M. Additional ligands such as pyridine or THF are commonly used as well. With zirconium as central atom and pyridine as ligand (Zirconocene bis(trimethylsilyl)acetylene pyridine), a dark purple to black solid with a melting point of 125–126 °C is obtained. Synthesizing Rosenthal's reagent of a titanocene source yields golden-yellow crystals of the titanocene bis(trimethylsilyl)acetylene complex with a melting point of 81–82 °C. This reagent enables the generation of the themselves unstable titanocene and zirconocene under mild conditions.

The reagent is named after the German chemist Uwe Rosenthal (born 1950) and was first synthesized by him and his co-workers in 1995.

== Synthesis ==
Rosenthal's reagent can be prepared by reduction of titanocene or zirconocene dichloride with magnesium in the presence of bis(trimethylsilyl)acetylene in THF. The illustrated product for a titanocene complex can be represented by the resonance structures A and B. If zirconium is used as central atom, additional ligands (e.g. pyridine) are necessary for stabilization.

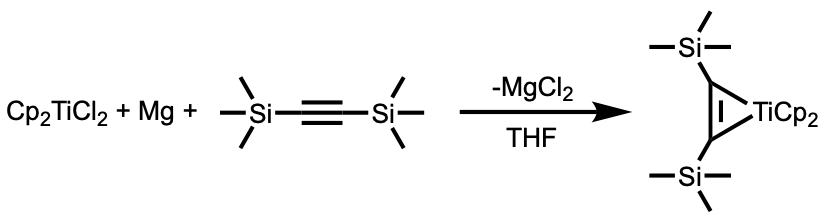
Titanocene bis(trimethylsilyl)acetylene Synthesis

The first successful synthesis of titanocene bis(trimethylsilyl)acetylene was accomplished by Uwe Rosenthal in 1988, via the reduction of Cp_{2}TiCl_{2} with magnesium and the alkyne Me_{3}SiC_{2}SiMe_{3}, in THF.

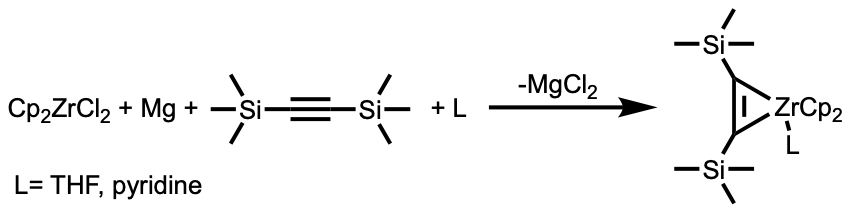
Zirconocene bis(trimethylsilyl)acetylene synthesis

This synthesis was immediately used to make other similar titanocene and zirconocene alkyne complexes. Under the same conditions, various zirconium complexes were synthesized, most utilizing other stabilizing ligands, including pyridine and THF. Notably, this synthesis also enabled the subsequent synthesis and characterization of the first zirconocene-alkyne complex without addition stabilizing ligands. This was accomplished with the reduction of racemic (EBTHI)ZrCl_{2} [EBTHI = 1,2-ethylene-1,1‘-bis(η5-tetrahydroindenyl)].

Zirconocene bis(trimethylsilyl)acetylene pyridine was originally synthesized by Rosenthal’s group in 1994 after they exchanged the coordinating solvent from tetrahydrofuran (THF) to pyridine. The exchange of the THF for the pyridine ligand provides extra stability in organic solvents preventing dimerization. The original synthesis involved the reduction of zirconocene dichloride and the addition of bis(trimethylsilyl)acetylene in THF before transferring to pyridine as mentioned above. More recently, Tilley and coworkers demonstrated a simpler synthesis with a higher yield bypassing the isolation of the less stable THF adduct. This newer method reacts zirconocene dichloride with 2 equivalents of n-Butyllithium in THF to form a metallacyclopropane which is subsequently substituted by bis(trimethylsilyl)acetylene and pyridine.

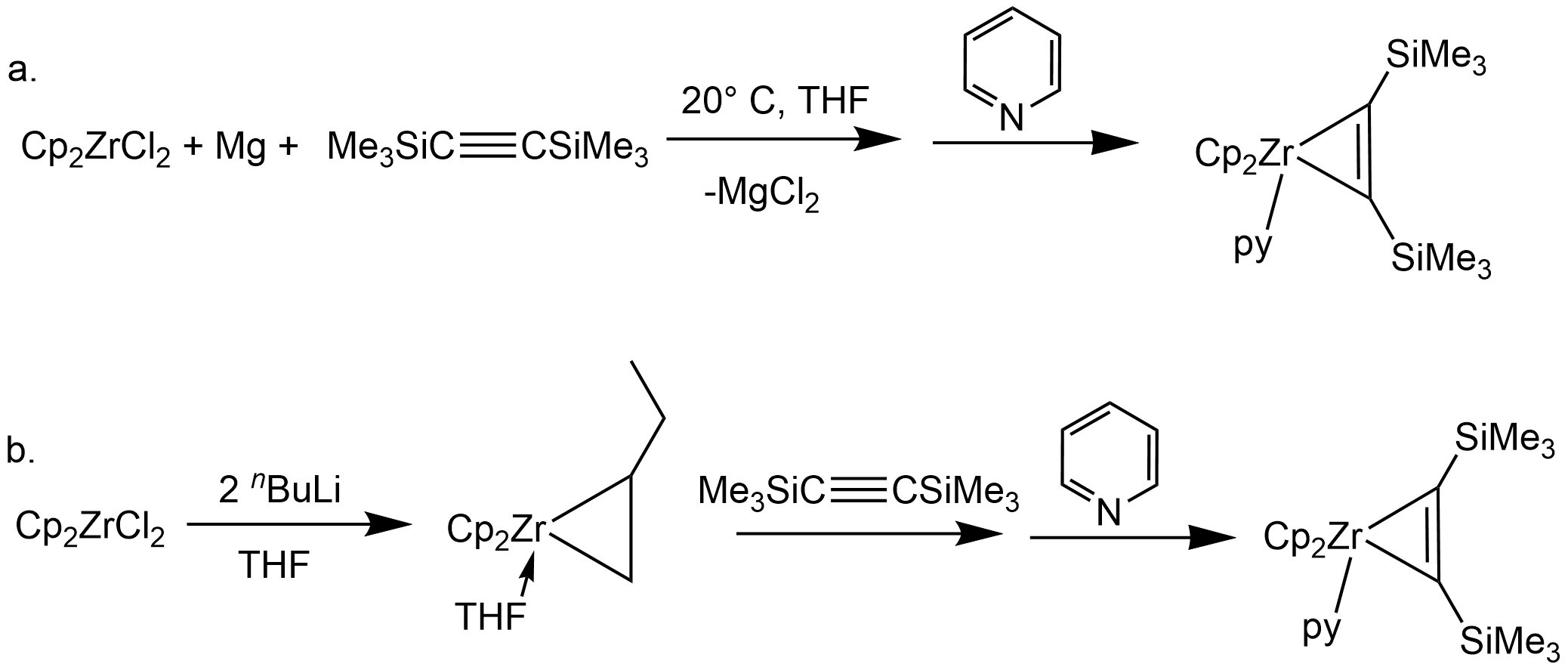
a.) Original synthesis description of zirconocene bis(trimethylsilyl)acetylene pyridine by Uwe Rosenthal's group. b.) Depiction of the more recent synthesis route to zirconocene bis(trimethylsilyl)acetylene pyridine created by T. Don Tilley's group.

== Structure and Characterization ==
Names
Titanocene bis(trimethylsilyl)acetylene	Rosenthal's reagent
Identifiers
Chemical formula	Ti(C_{5}H_{5})_{2}C_{2}(Si(CH_{3})_{3})_{2,} TiSi_{2}C_{18}H_{28}
Properties
Molar mass	396.312 g/mol
Melting point	81-82 °C

=== Crystal Structure ===
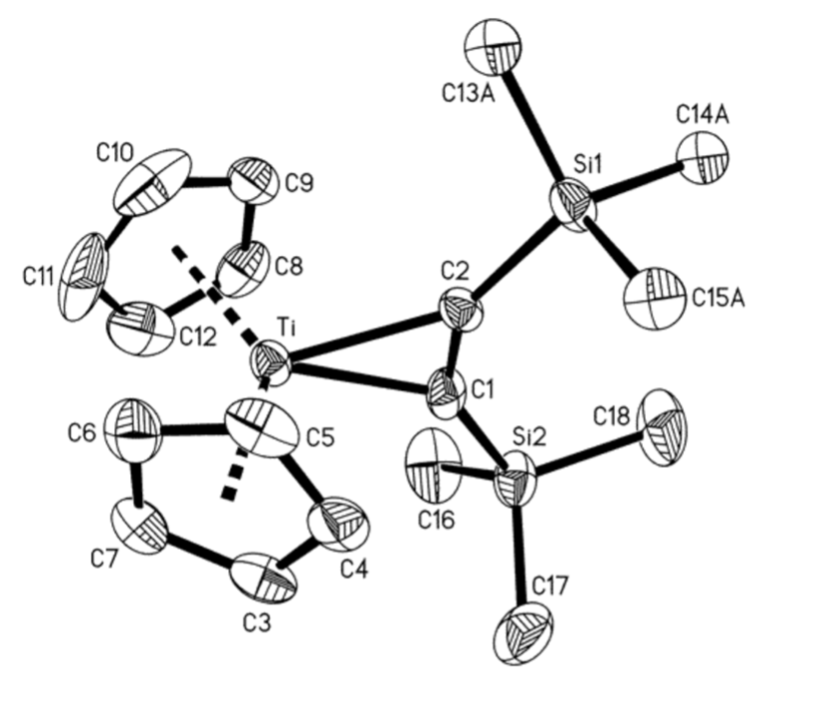
ORTEP plot of titanocene bis(trimethylsilyl)acetylene

For much of the history of titanocene bis(trimethylsilyl)acetylene, there has been no X-ray crystal structure. Many attempts to obtain crystals failed, due to the complex’s extremely high solubility in all suitable solvents. However, researchers obtained many crystal structures of similar compounds of the type Cp_{2}Ti(η^{2}R_{3}SiC_{2}SiR_{3}), such as Cp=Cp*, R=tBu, and R=Ph. The crystal structure of the parent complex was not obtained until suitable crystals were serendipitously recovered from reaction mixtures. Once successfully obtained, the crystal structure displayed a bent titanocene with the coordinated alkyne ligand located between the Cp ligand planes. The angles between the titanium-coordinated alkyne ligand and each Cp ligand plane are 21.5° and 25.2°, respectively. To themselves, the Cp ligands form an angle of 46.6°. The Si atoms bonded to the alkyne carbons are almost perfectly in plane, with a torsion angle of 6.5°.

The triple bond of the alkyne has a length of 1.283(6) Å. This value is longer than that of the free alkyne (1.208 Å), and closer to that of a double bond (1.331 Å). Furthermore, the distances between the titanium center and the carbon atoms of the coordinated alkyne are 2.136(5) Å and 2.139(4) Å. These values fall within the range of reported endocyclic Ti-C(sp^{2}) σ-bonds.

=== Computation ===
Researchers have calculated the bonding nature of various metallocene acetylene complexes. Cp_{2}Ti(η^{2}-Me_{3}SiC_{2}SiMe_{3}) was modeled using a B3LYP density functional theory (DFT) computation. This revealed the metallocyclopropane group is composed of two in-plane σ-bonds from the carbons to the metal, and one out-of-plane π-bond that also interacts with the metal. This type of interaction is a 3-center, 2-electron bond. Although the aromatic stabilization is the lowest for titanium of the Group 4 metals, the complex is aromatic. These computational results were in agreement with the X-ray structural data.

=== IBO Analysis ===
Further DFT calculations were carried out using the PBE0 D3BJ/ def2-TZVP functional and visualization in IBOview. These illustrate the nature of the frontier orbitals in titanocene bis(trimethylsilyl)acetylene. The blue and purple orbitals display the highest occupied molecular orbital (HOMO) found on the complex. These are located between the coordinated alkyne and the metal, in the 2-electron, 3-center system. The green and yellow orbitals display the lowest occupied molecular orbital (LUMO), found on titanium.

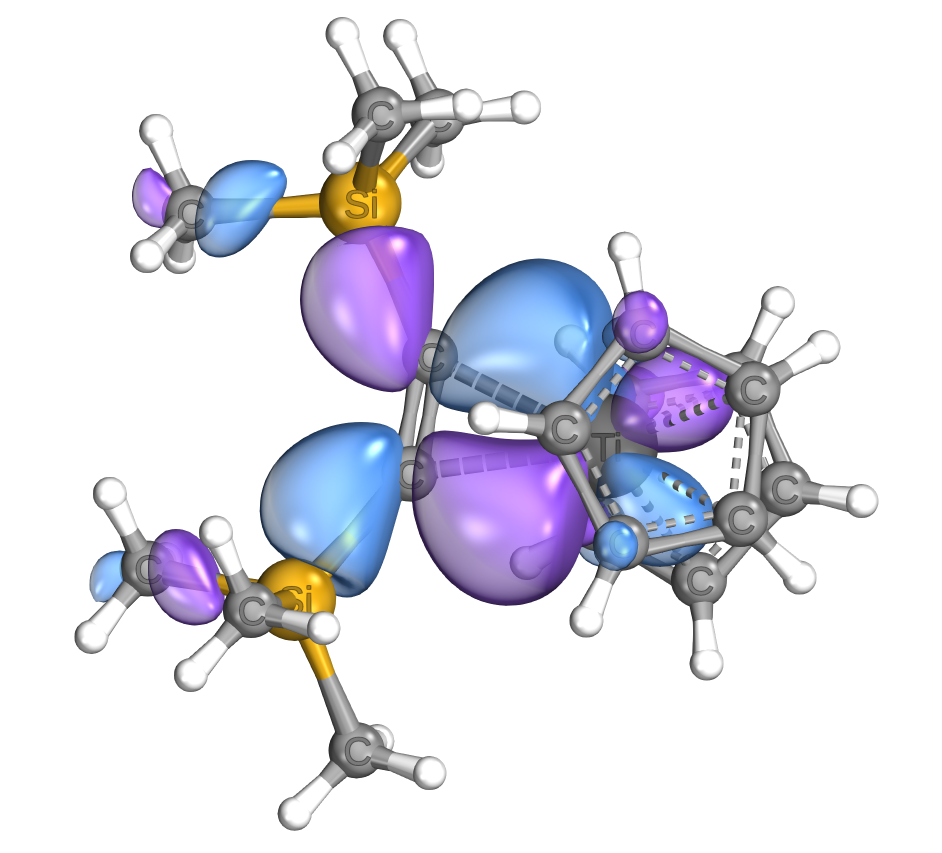
Titanocene bis(trimethylsilyl)acetylene HOMO

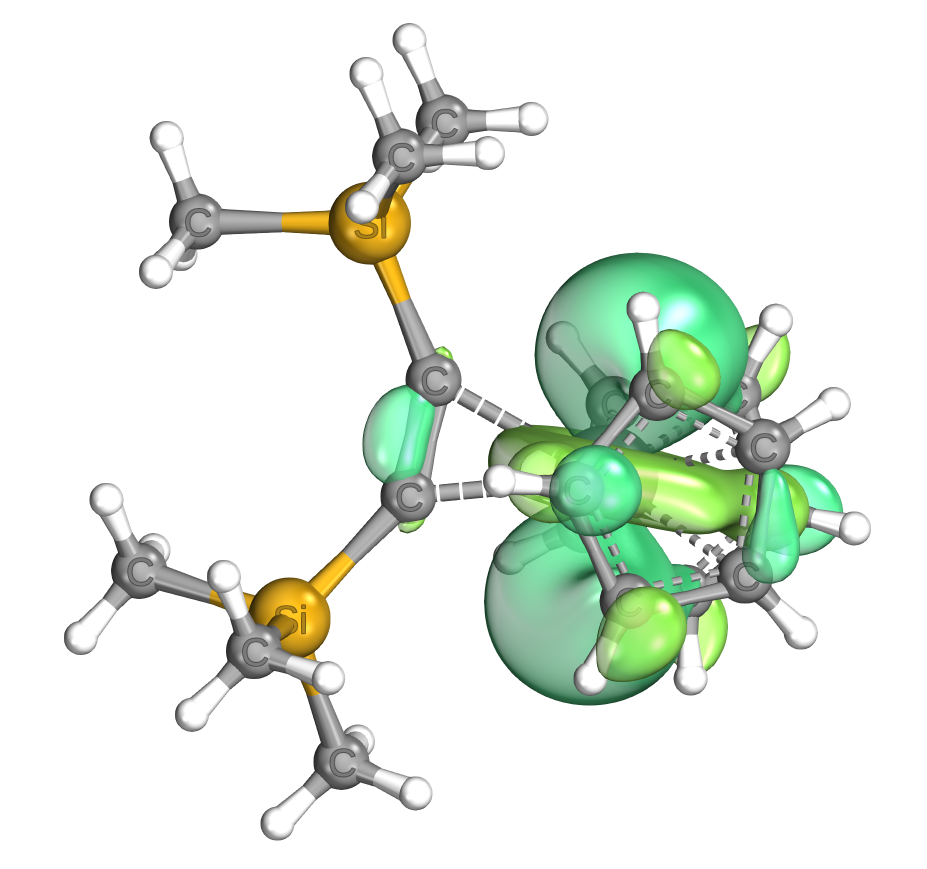
Titanocene bis(trimethylsilyl)acetylene LUMO

== Bonding ==
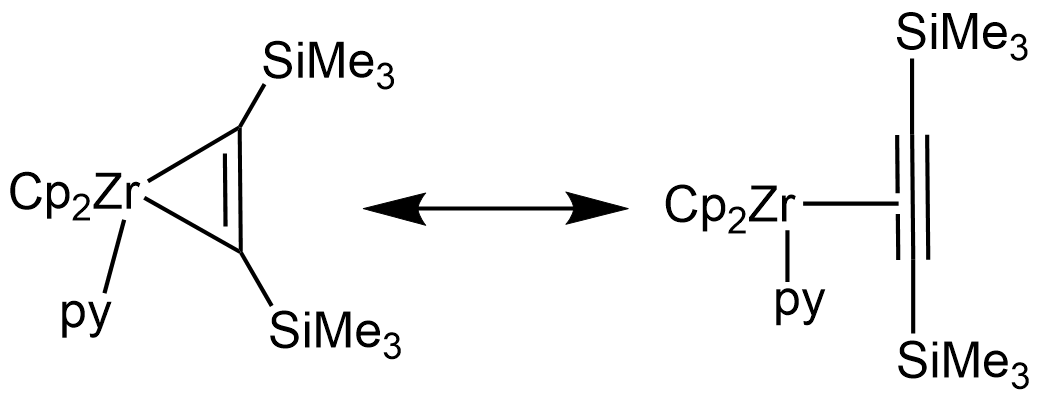
Two resonance structures of zirconocene bis(trimethylsilyl)acetylene pyridine.

The two main resonance structures of Zirconocene bis(trimethylsilyl)acetylene pyridine include a variation where the C-C triple bond binds side on to the metal and another with the 1-metallacyclopropene configuration. Density functional theory (DFT) calculations showed metal-carbon sigma bonds in addition to an out of plane pi bond corresponding to the 1-metallacyclopropene depiction being a major resonance form. However, a subsequent series of calculations by Leites and colleagues using a higher level of theory showed molecular orbitals more consistent with the triple bond description.

== Reactivity ==
The original creation of zirconocene bis(trimethylsilyl)acetylene pyridine was accompanied by reactivity studies of the complex with common small molecules in the form of carbon dioxide and water. Both reactions involved the loss of the pyridine ligand and creation of bimetallic complexes containing bridging-oxo substituents, with the carbon dioxide inserting to create a series of fused metallacycles and the water’s hydrogen atoms breaking up the metallacyclopropenes.

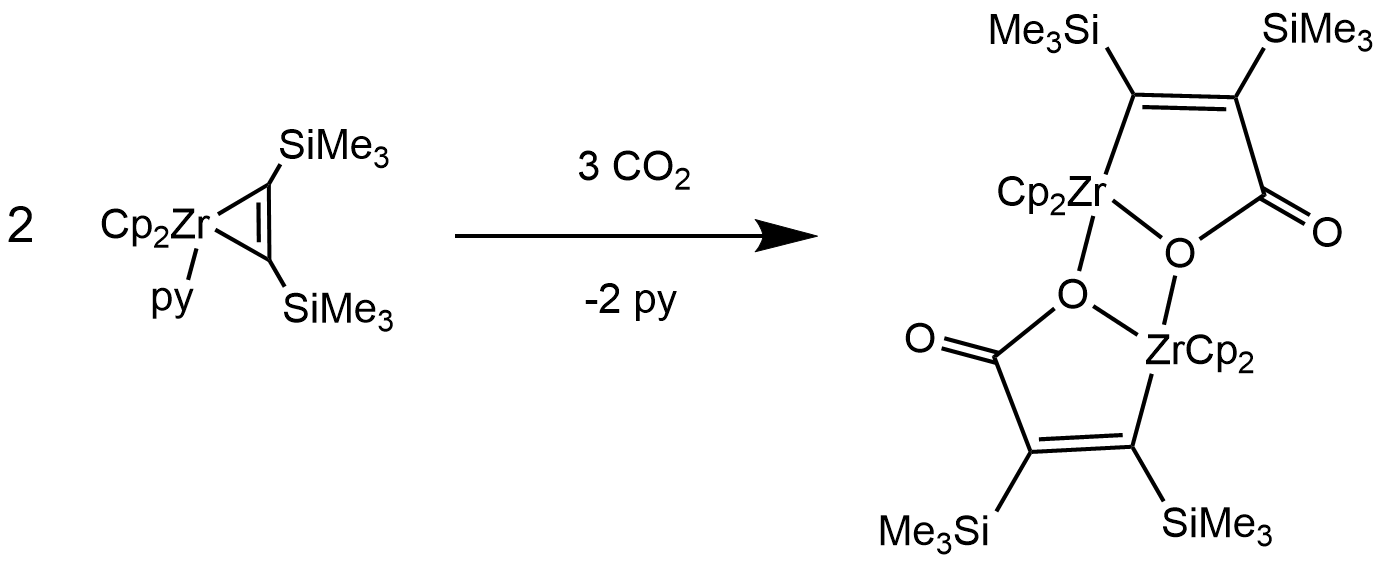
Reaction of carbon dioxide with zirconocene bis(trimethylsilyl)acetylene pyridine.

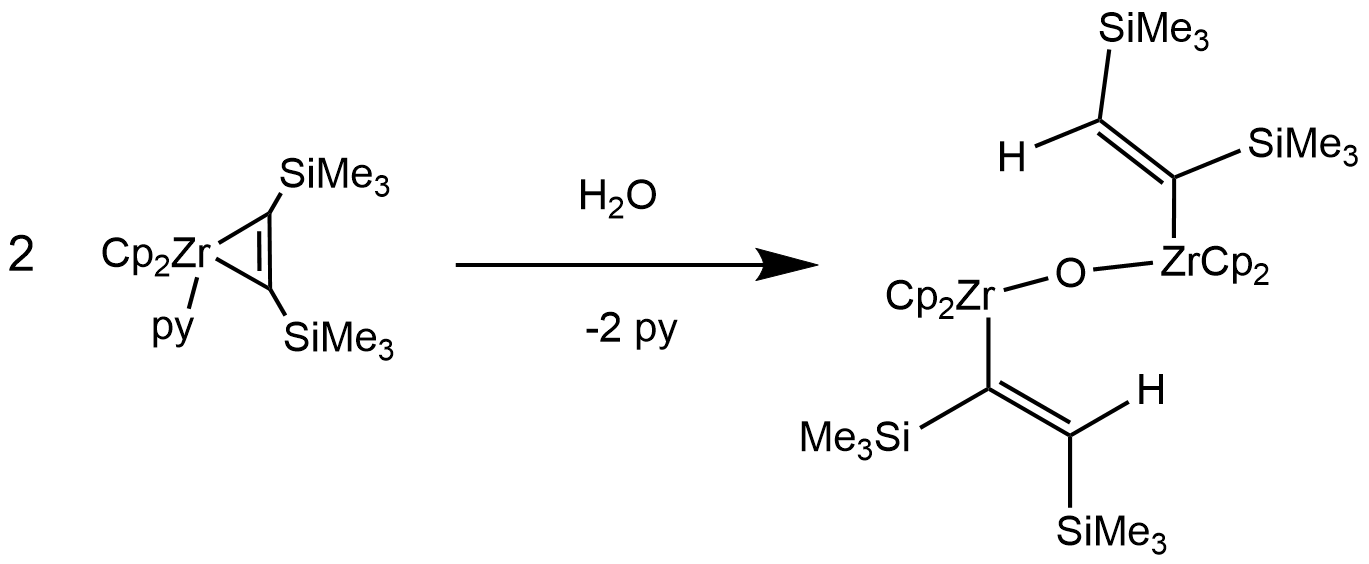
Reaction of zirconocene bis(trimethylsilyl)acetylene pyridine with water.

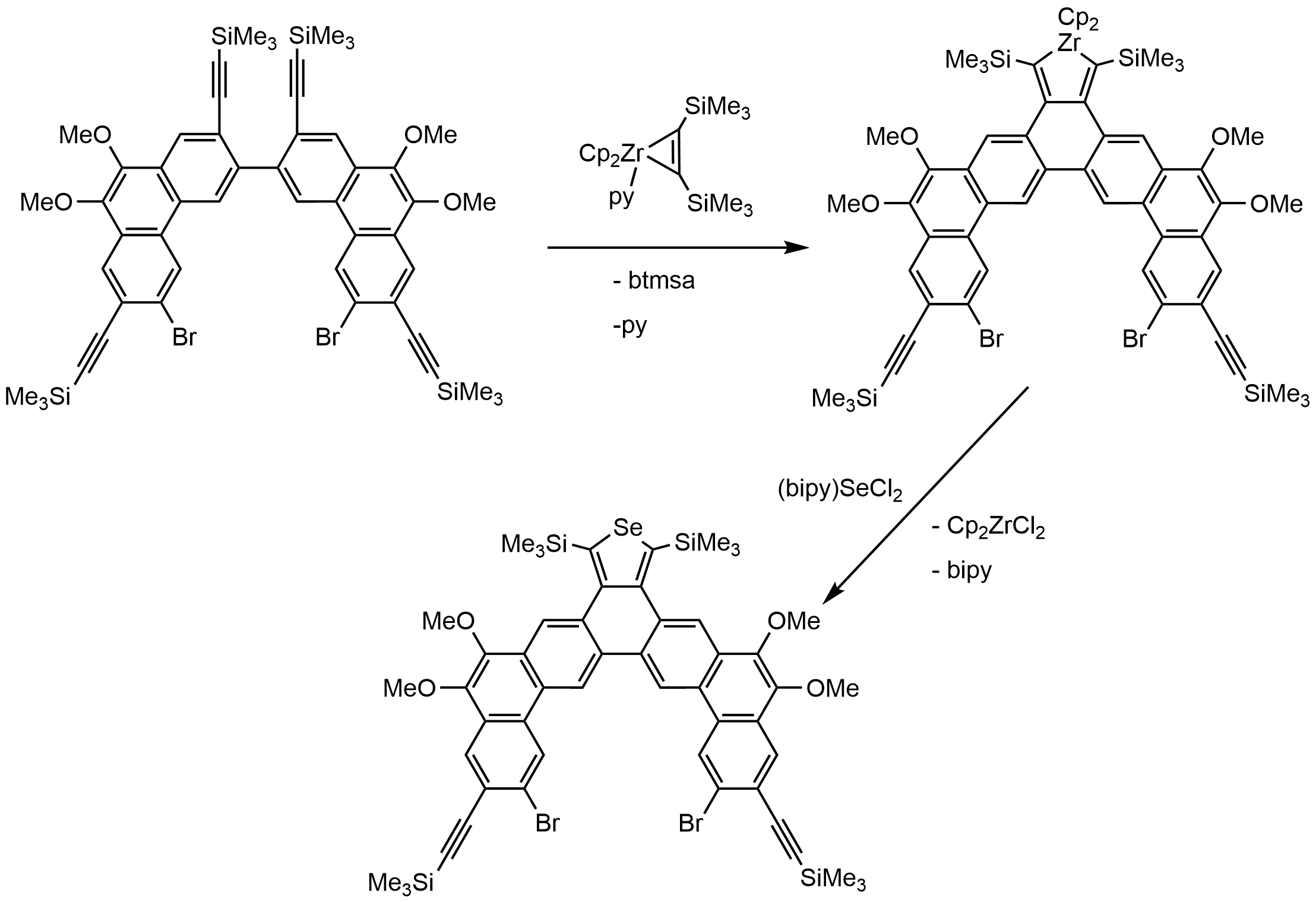
Tilley group's functionalization reaction of extended polycyclic aromatic hydrocarbons (PAH) with zirconocene bis(trimethylsilyl)acetylene pyridine to incorporate selenium into the PAH.

More generally, the main reactivity for this version of Rosenthal’s reagent is its reaction with alkynes to replace the zirconacyclopropene with a larger zirconacyclopentadiene rings. T. Don Tilley and colleagues have extensively utilized this functionality to create zirconocene based macrocycles with considerable tunability based on the alkyne used. These large macrocycles can subsequently be reacted with hydrochloric acid to lose the zirconocene dichloride leaving behind new carbon-carbon bonds. Following these macrocycles, the Tilley group also showed that the zirconocene bis(trimethylsilyl)acetylene pyridine could aid in the creation of various polycyclic aromatic hydrocarbons via [2+2+n] cycloaddition reactions. As seen with the acidic conditions above, the zirconocene fragment is easily displaced and Tilley demonstrated the ability to insert selenium into the framework. Rivard's group also showed an analogous transmetalation process allowing for the replacement of zirconium with tellurium.

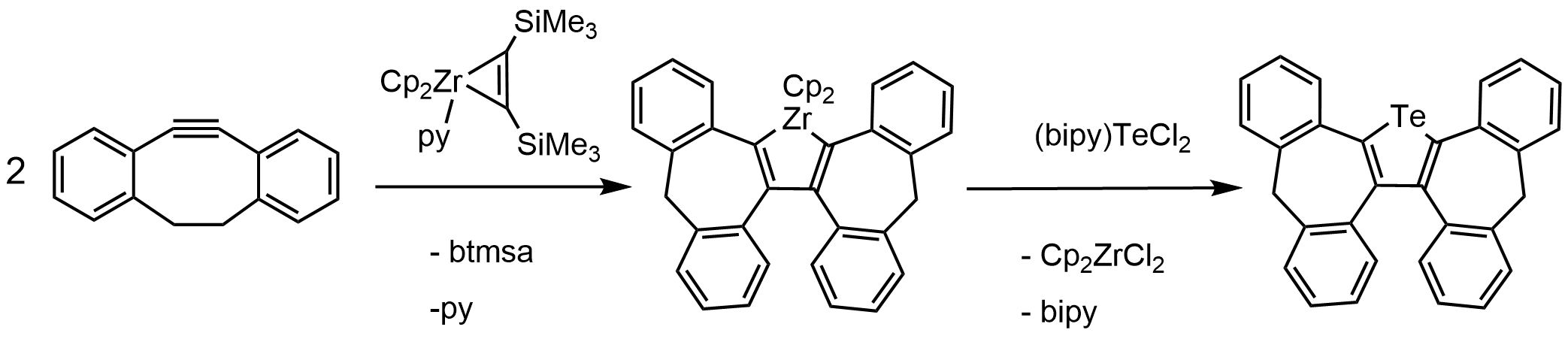
Reaction of a cyclic alkyne complex with zirconocene bis(trimethylsilyl)acetylene pyridine and subsequent transmetallation to create tellurium heterocycles.

Rosenthal also continued exploring the reactivity of the zirconocene bis(trimethylsilyl)acetylene pyridine showing the ability to functionalize the zirconacyclopentadienes in addition to modifying the ring itself. This latter study involved the reaction of substrates like tertbutyl substituted 1,3 butadiyne to create novel zirconacyclocumulene complexes.

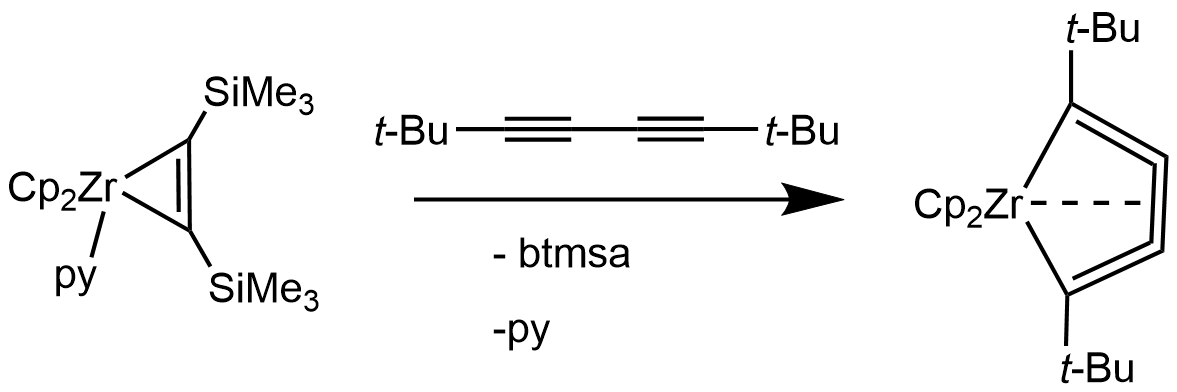
Reaction of zirconocene bis(trimethylsilyl)acetylene pyridine with a dialkyne to make a zirconocumulene

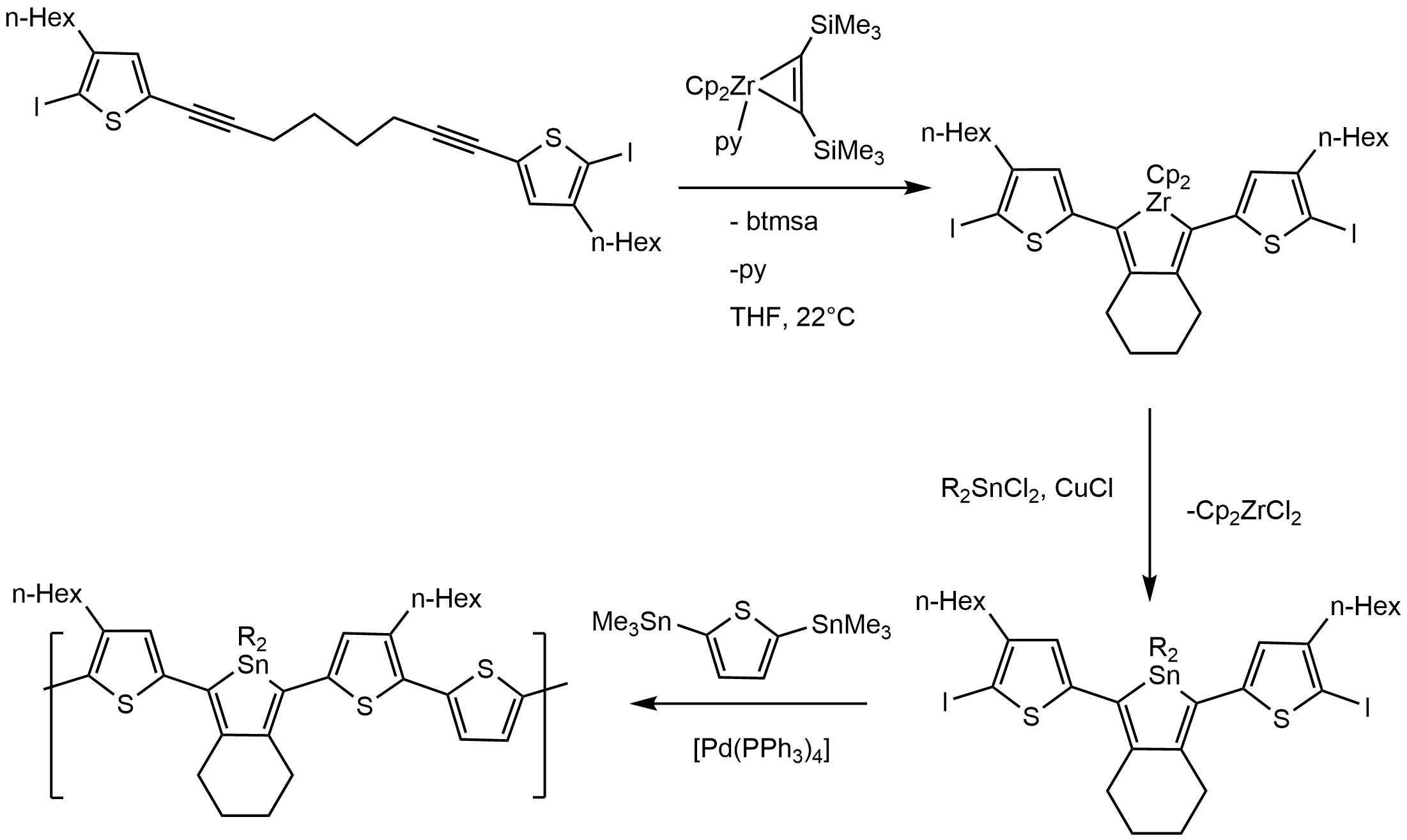
Reaction of functionalized dialkynes with zirconocene bis(trimethylsilyl)acetylene pyridine on the path to tin containing polymers.

In 2018, Staubitz and coworkers used the pyridine complex in combination with dialkyne complexes to form the zirconacyclopentadiene after loss of the pyridine and the bis(trimethylsilyl)acetylene. These zirconium metallacycles can then be transmetalated to create functionalized stannoles which Staubitz later used in Stille cross coupling reactions to form polymers with thiophene groups.

Staubitz’s group followed this with a reactivity comparison between Cp_{2}Zr(btmsa)(py) and Negishi’s reagent with respect to forming zirconacyclopentadienes. They found that this reaction took place quicker and more efficiently than with Negishi’s reagent.

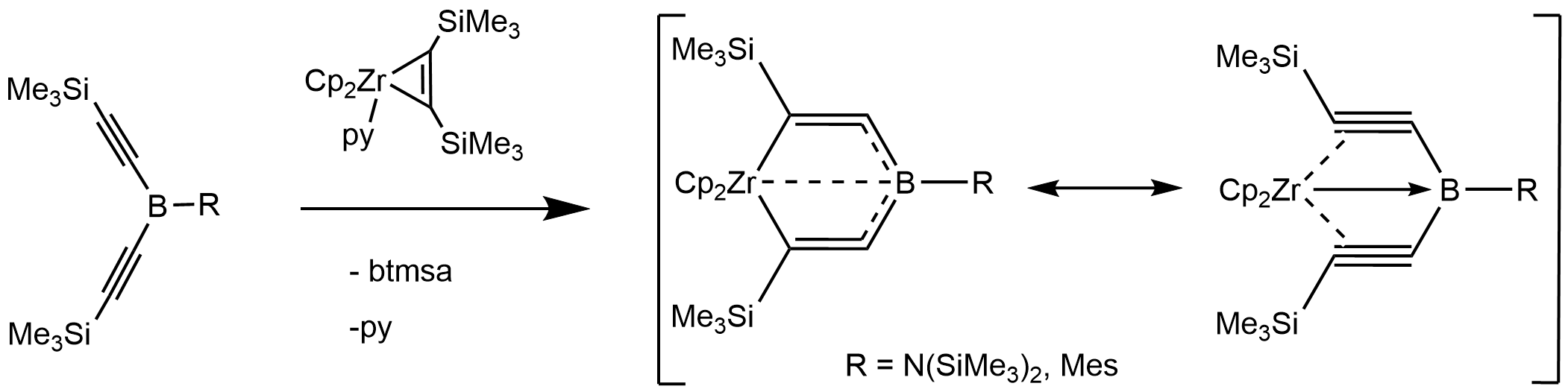
Reaction of a dialkyne boron complex with zirconocene bis(trimethylsilyl)acetylene pyridine.

In 2019, Ye and coworkers further extended the scope of the pyridine Rosenthal reagent reactivity, demonstrating its reaction with bis(alkylnyl)boranes in an attempt to create compounds capable of activating small molecules. The product of this reaction has resonance structures including a boron zirconium(IV) 6-member heterocycle and a zirconium(II) donating into the boron stabilized by the two alkynes.

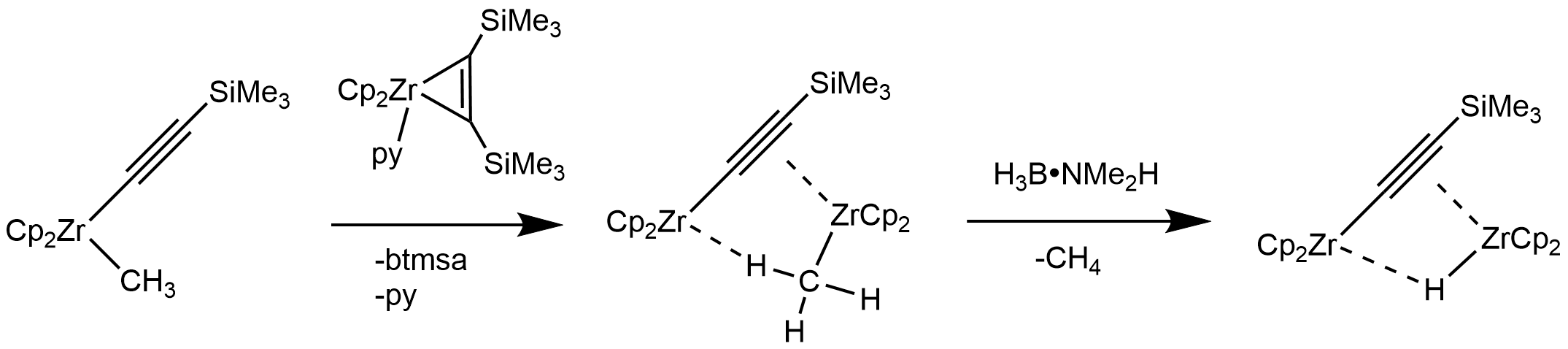
Reaction of a zirconocene methyl alkyne complex with zirconocene bis(trimethylsilyl)acetylene pyridine to create bridging methyl and bridging hydride dizirconocene complexes.

Zirconocene bis(trimethylsilyl)acetylene pyridine was also shown to react with other zirconocene derivatives containing alkyne substituents with Lindenau et al. showing the creation of a bimetallic transition metal hydride. This was achieved by the reaction of Rosenthal’s reagent with Zr(Cp)_{2}(CH_{3})(CCSiMe_{3}) to create a methyl bridged complex which could be converted to the hydride upon the addition of BH_{3}•NHMe_{2}.

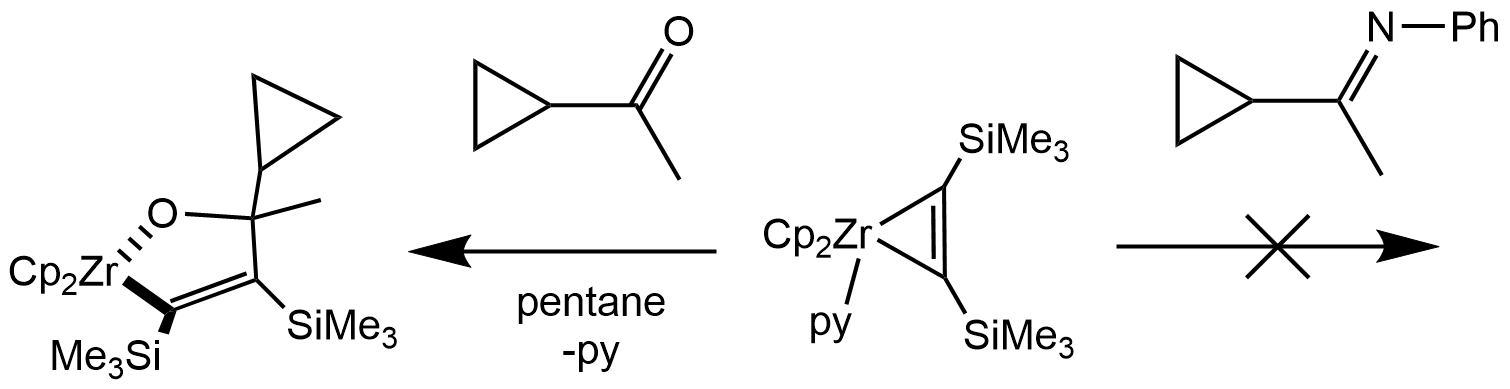
Reactions of zirconcene bis(trimethylsilyl)acetylene pyridine with cyclopropyl methyl ketone and 1-cyclopropyl-N-phenylethan-1-imine.

Tonks and colleagues looked into the reactivity of this Rosenthal reagent as a potential ring opening complex, but instead formed new zirconocene heterocycles. Upon addition of the zirconocene bis(trimethylsilyl) acetylene pyridine to cyclopropyl methyl ketone, a zirconium oxygen bond formed simultaneously forming a new carbon-carbon bond from the cyclopropene and the carbonyl carbon.

=== The metal-alkyne interaction and general reactivity ===
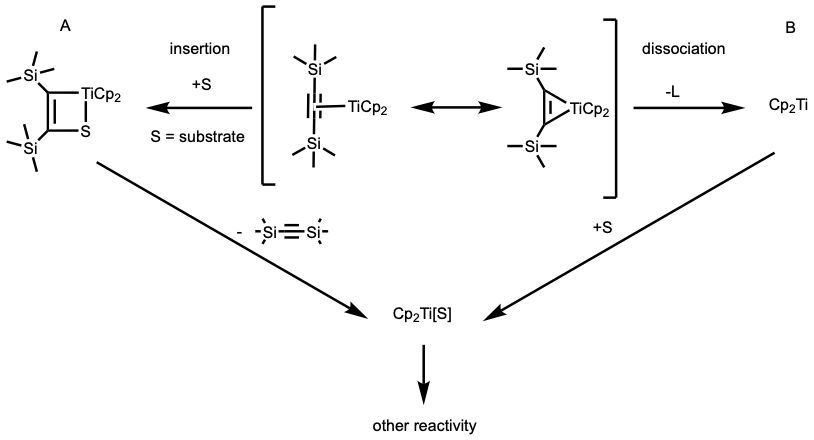
Titanocene bis(trimethylsilyl)acetylene alkyne-metal interaction reaction sequence

There exist 2 resonance forms of this complex, the acetylenic pi-complex, and the metallocyclopropene complex. The major type of interaction dictates the reaction pathway the complex will follow. The insertion pathway involves insertion of the substrate to form a metallocycloprane ring, followed by loss of the alkyne. The dissociation pathway involves dissociation of the alkyne to generate the reactive Cp_{2}Ti intermediate, which is then trapped by reaction with the substrate. The interaction between the metal and alkyne can be controlled by changing the metal (Ti or Zr) and the ligands, including the type of Cp ligand and the substitution on the alkyne. The Cp_{2}Ti species is an unstable Ti(II), d^{2} complex with 14 total electrons. Because it contains a lone electron pair held in 2 valence orbitals, its reactivity can be compared to carbenes. This form often undergoes reactions with a variety of olefins to yield metallacycles.

A special feature of titanocene bis(trimethylsilyl) and its zirconium analogues is the ability it derives from coordination of the alkyne to stabilize the metallocene fragment. This alkyne can be released under relatively mild conditions to yield the reactive and unstable Cp_{2}Ti intermediate. This reactivity manifests in a variety of reactions, some of which are detailed below. For a comprehensive review, visit "Recent Synthetic and Catalytic Applications of Group 4 Metallocene Bis(trimethylsilyl)acetylene Complexes".

=== Representative reactions ===
==== Reactions with carbonyl compounds ====
Titanocene bis(trimethylsilyl)acetylene reacts with carbonyl compounds to generate metallacyclic titanium-dihydrofuran complexes. The constitution of the products depends on the steric bulk of the groups on the carbonyl compound, with the metallocyclopropane product only being obtained with sufficiently sterically bulky groups, such as R/R' = phenyl.

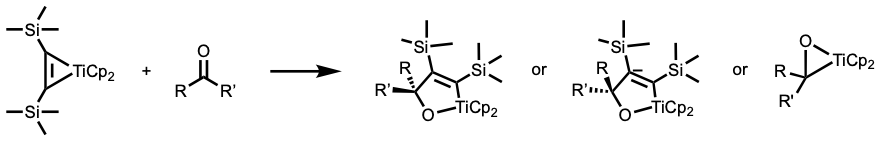
Titanocene bis(trimethylsilyl)acetylene reactions with carbonyl compounds

==== Ring Enlargement ====
Heterocyclic systems containing C=N bonds undergo a ring enlargement via a coupling reaction.

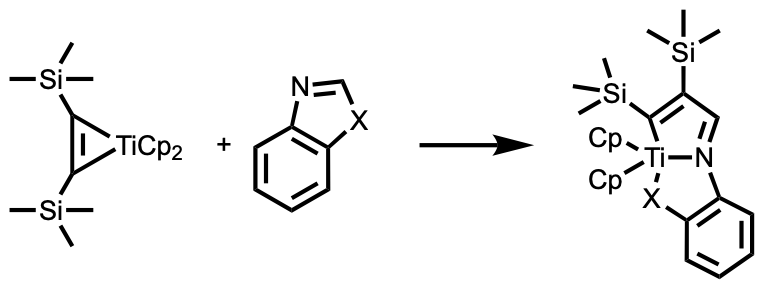
Ring enlargement with titanocene bis(trimethylsilyl)acetylene

==== Polymerization of Acetylene ====
Polymerization of acetylene was achieved at 20-60 °C when titanocene bis(trimethylsilyl)acetylene was utilized as a precatalyst. Yield and properties of the resulting polyacetylene could be modulated by the solvent used. 100% trans-polyacetylene could be obtained in pyridine.

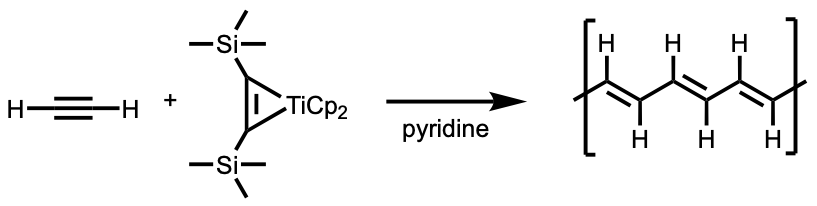
Polyacectylene synthesis with titanocene bis(trimethylsilyl)acetylene

==== Oligimerization of 1-Alkenes ====
Titanocene bis(trimethylsilyl)acetylene afforded the linear polymerization of 1-alkenes with a selectivity over 98%. This reaction also accomplished a turnover number of 1200-1500.

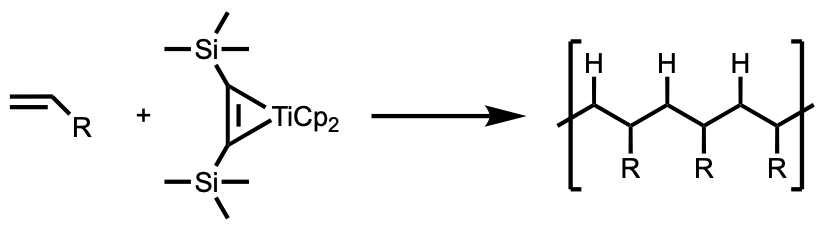
1-alkene polymerization with titanocene bis(trimethylsilyl)acetylene

== Applications ==
The main area of application is the synthesis of synthetically challenging organic structures such as macrocycles and heterometallacycles. Rosenthal's reagent allows the selective preparation of these compounds with high yields.

Currently, Rosenthal's reagent is often used instead of Negishi's reagent (1-butene)zirconocene to generate zirconocene fragments as it offers a number of compelling advantages. Unlike Negishi's reagent, Rosenthal's reagent is stable at room temperature and can be stored indefinitely under an inert atmosphere. A much more precise control over the stoichiometry of reactions is possible, especially because the instable (1-butene)zirconocene cannot be formed quantitatively. Stoichiometric and catalytic reactions can be performed and influenced by the use of different ligands, metals and substrate substituents. While for titanium complexes, a dissociative reaction mechanism has been observed, zirconium complexes favor an associative pathway. The combination of these organometallic complexes with different suitable substrates (e.g. carbonyl compounds, acetylenes, imines, azoles, etc.) often leads to novel bond types and reactivities. A particularly interesting aspect is the novel C–C coupling reaction of nitriles to form precursors for the realization of so far unknown heterometallacycles. As main side products of coupling reactions with Rosenthal's reagent, pyridine and bis(trimethylsilyl)acetylene are obtained. These compounds are soluble and volatile, and therefore easy to remove from the product mixture.

== Recent Developments ==
Past synthesis, including those mentioned previously, have been straightforward, but require extreme caution in the exclusion of water and air to obtain a pure, catalytically useful complex. The success of the synthesis is also heavily dependent on the quality of Mg(0) used. In 2020, Beckhaus and coworkers reported a more robust synthesis of titanocene bis(trimethylsilyl)acetylene from Cp_{2}TiCl_{2} and EtMgBr. This synthesis is predicted to have a positive impact on the growth of investigations into applications of the complex.

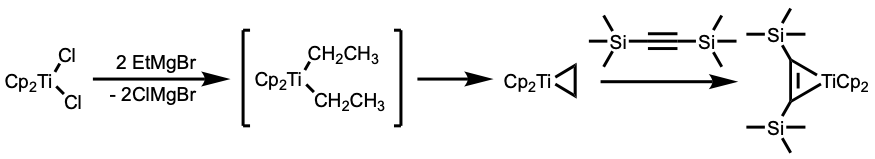
New titanocene bis(trimethylsilyl)acetylene synthesis

Similarly, the synthesis of other titanocene bis(trimethylsilyl) acetylene complexes have been reported, such as the low-valent ansa-dimethylsilylene, dimethylmethylene–bis(cyclopentadienyl)titanium.

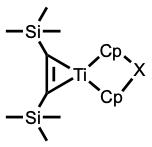
Ansa-dimethylsilylene, dimethylmethylene–bis(cyclopentadienyl)titanium

== History ==
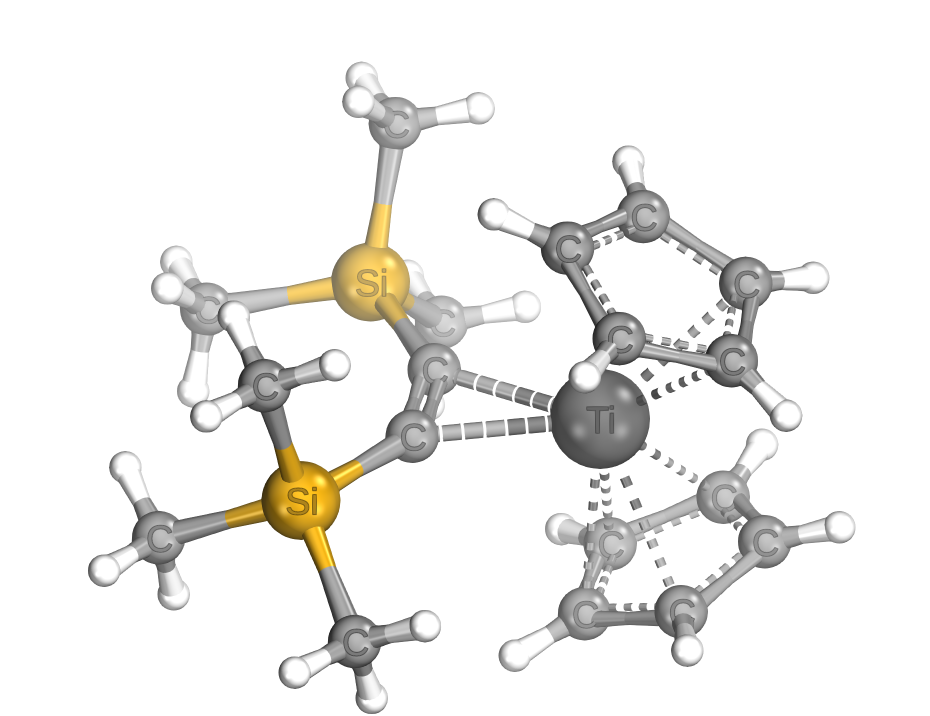
Molecular structure of titanocene bis(trimethylsilyl)acetylene

Titanocene bis(trimethylsilyl)acetylene complexes were first mentioned by the group of Vol’pin in Moscow in 1961. Using the isolobal analogy, the group argued that silacyclopropanes would be a stable group of compounds, due to their similarities to the cyclopropenyl cation. However, true three-membered rings containing a silicon atom and a carbon-carbon double bond, silirenes, were not reported until 1971. Seyferth and coworkers were the first to synthesize these molecules. Later, Vol’pin again utilized the isolobal analogy to react diphenylacetylene with titanocene (Cp_{2}Ti, where Cp = cyclopentadienyl, rather than dialkylsilene) in an attempt to synthesize unsaturated 1-heterocyclopropanes. Although this was unsuccessful, titanocyclopropane (Cp_{2}Ti(η^{2}-PhC_{2}Ph)) was isolated. In 1988, Vol’pin selected the alkyne bis(trimethylsilyl)acetylene as the most likely reactant for the synthesis of a stable titanocene-alkyl complex. The group, led by the postdoctoral associate Rosenthal, successfully obtained Cp_{2}Ti(η^{2}-Me_{3}SiC_{2}SiMe_{3}) in high yield, as a yellow-orange substance.
