= Cyclopentadienylcobalt dinitrosyl =

Organometallic molecule

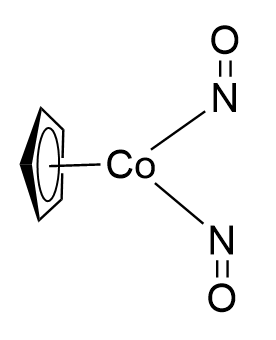
Cyclopentadienylcobalt dinitrosyl

Cyclopentadienylcobalt dinitrosyl is an organometallic molecule. It is a reactive intermediate in the formation of dinitrosoalkane cobalt complexes. While cyclopentadienylcobalt dinitrosyl has not been isolated and characterized, the preparation of this reactive intermediate in the presence of olefins results in the isolable dinitrosoalkane cobalt complexes. The dinitrosyl intermediate is known for its alkene binding capability. The resulting dinitrosoalkane cobalt complexes are capable of stoichiometric and catalytic C-H bond functionalization.

== Discovery ==
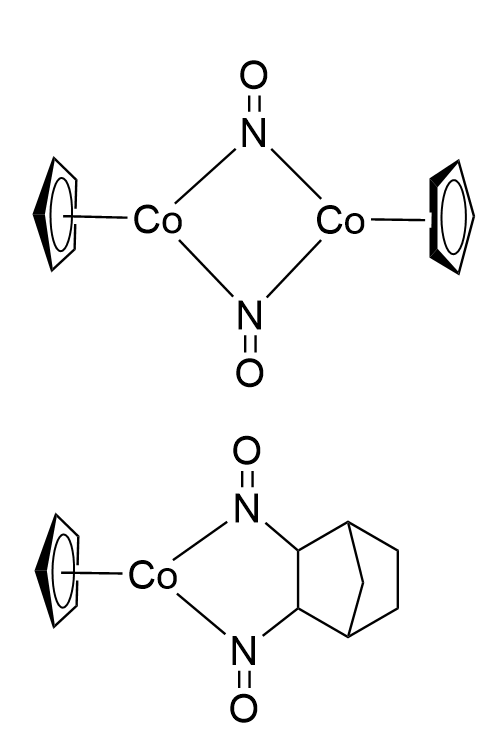
Cyclopentadienyl cobalt dinitrosyl dimer [CpCoNO]_{2} and dinitrosoalkane made with norbornene, as synthesized by Henri Brunner

This nitrosyl cobalt complex was first discovered in 1967 by Henri Brunner at the Technical University of Munich. By reacting cyclopentadienylcobalt dicarbonyl with NO in hexane at room temperature, he obtained a dimer (CpCoNO)_{2}. The dimer was formed by bridging nitrosyl (NO) ligands, which connected the two CpCo units. Based on a dipole moment of 1.61 D observed in hexane, Brunner suggested that the nitrosyl ligands extended above the plane of the cobalt atoms. However, crystal structures of the dimer have shown that the nitrosyl ligands and the cobalt atoms lie in the same plane. Subsequently, in 1973, Brunner discovered that the dimer could react with NO and an olefin to form a monomeric cyclopentadienylcobalt dinitrosoalkane, in which the protons of the olefin assumed the endo position. However, the scope of such reactions was limited to norbornene-type olefins. Ethylene and cyclohexene also reacted but the resulting products could not be purified for structure-determination. Notably, this transformation was ligand-based rather than occurring at the metal center, which is unusual for an organometallic transformation. Brunner's initial investigations of the cyclopentadienylcobalt nitrosyl dimer suggested that an olefin could be activated through interaction with the dimer, but the synthetic utility and identification of the monomeric reactive intermediate, cyclopentadienylcobalt dinitrosyl, were yet to be explored. Furthermore, the origin of the stereoselectivity had not been determined.

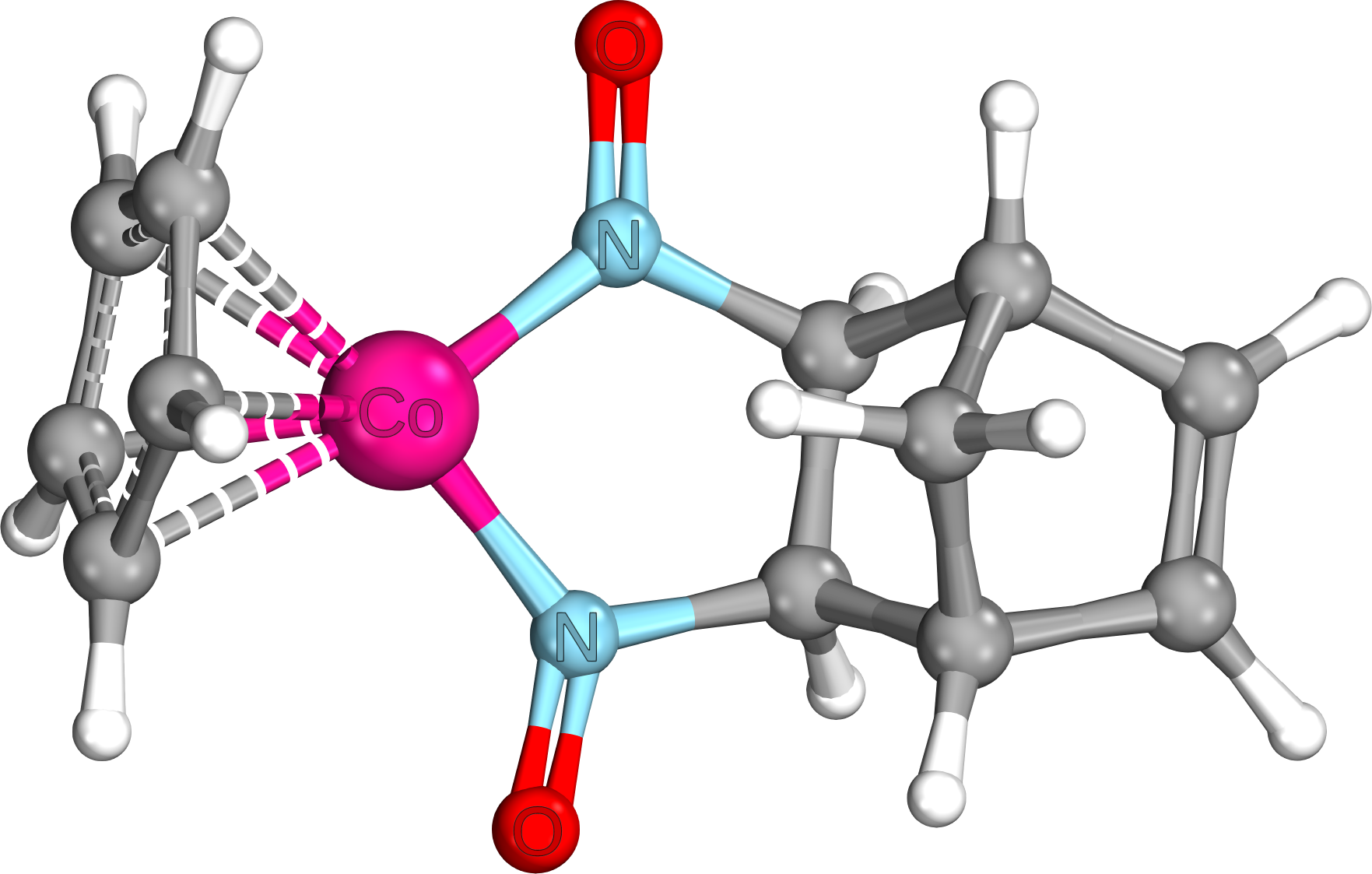
Crystal structure of the cyclopentadienylcobalt dinitrosoalkane prepared with norbornadiene.

Brunner's findings were verified by a later crystallographic study conducted by Bernal and coworkers. They confirmed that the hydrogen atoms did occupy the endo positions of norbornene, and the nitroso ligands occupy the exo positions. The crystallographic data of the Co(NO)_{2}C_{2} fragment closely resembles data from molecules containing free nitroxyl radicals, which led Bernal to suggest that the fragment behaves like a nitroxyl free radical. Specifically, the Co-N-C bond angle of 118.2(2)° closely resembles that of 2,2,5,5-tetramethyl-3-carbamidopyrroline-1-oxyl and other molecules containing free nitroxyl radicals. The N-O bond distances, as well as stretching frequencies closely agree too.

== Early synthetic applications ==
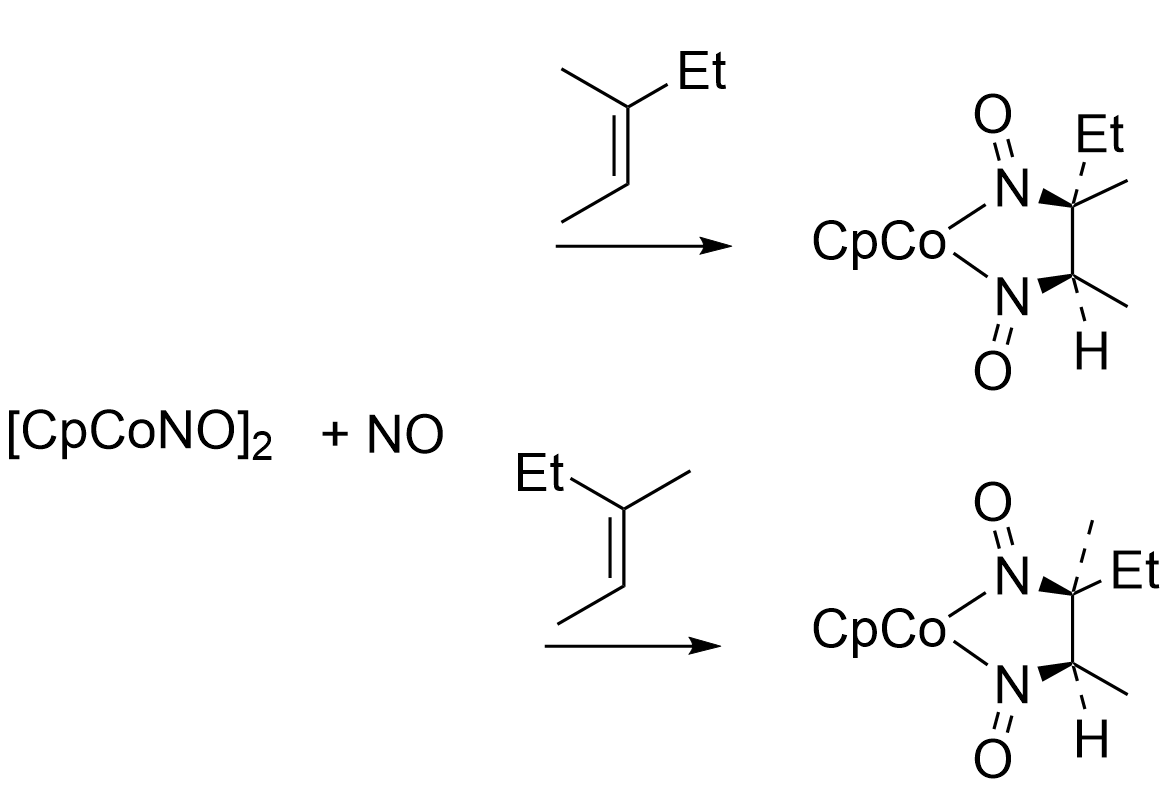
Stereoselectivity of cyclopentadienyl cobaltdinitrosyl with E and Z olefins

=== Olefin binding ===
Whereas in Brunner's work the dinitrosoalkane was not further functionalized, Becker and Robert Bergman demonstrated in the 1980s that the functionalized organic fragment resulting from alkene activation could be released from the dinitrosoalkane complex, and that other unstrained olefins could be made to react with the dimer. They hypothesized that the reaction of the dimer [CpCoNO]_{2} with NO and olefin proceeded via formation of the cyclopentadienylcobalt dinitrosyl intermediate. Specifically, they suggested that simple olefins could not trap this proposed intermediate fast enough. This led them to perform the reaction with excess amounts of olefin so that the trapping rate would increase and correspondingly improve the yield of the reaction. Simple aliphatic olefins could thus be reacted with the dimer to produce the corresponding dinitrosoalkane. Brunner had demonstrated that the reaction of the dimer with norbornene-type olefins resulted in the protons occupying the endo position. Bergman showed that the reaction was completely stereospecific for unrestrained aliphatic olefins by reacting the dimer with (E)- and (Z)-3-methyl-2-pentene. These reactions gave isomerically pure products, which showed that the stereospecificity was not exclusive to ring-strained substrates like norbornene.

=== 1,2-Diamination ===
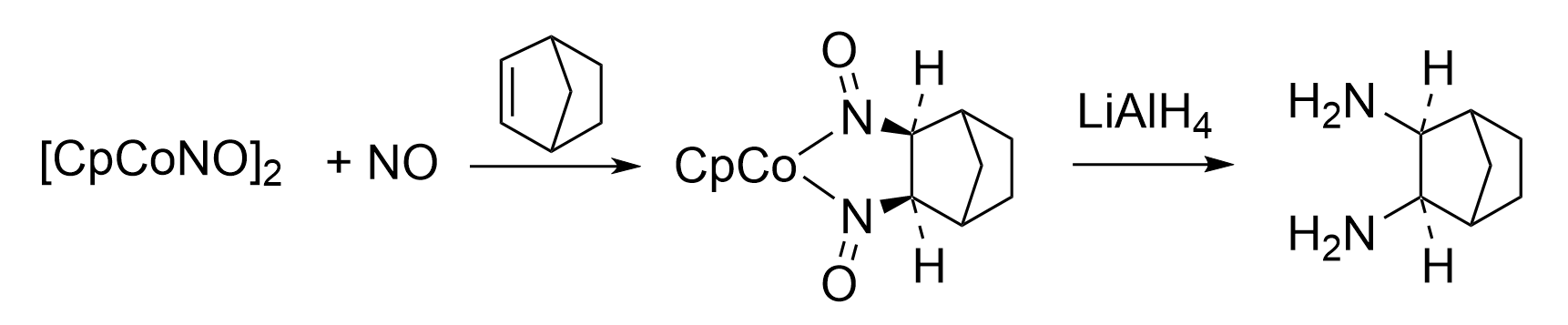
1,2-diamination of olefins with cyclopentadienylcobalt dinitrosyl

Bergman attempted to release the dinitrosoalkane ligand from cobalt via ligand substitution with CO or phosphine, and direct oxidation of the substrate. These unsuccessful experiments suggested the presence of π-backbonding from the cobalt to the nitrosyl ligands. With the presence of π-backbonding, the ligands would resemble nitroxides or nitroxyl radicals rather than nitroso ligands, as suggested by Bernal's XRD study. Despite this shortcoming, Bergman and Becker were successful when they reduced the dinitrosoalkane with LiAlH_{4}. This reaction resulted in the net conversion of alkenes to 1,2-diamines and was applied to a variety of olefins with good yields. The amination reaction however could not be performed with a high degree of stereoselectivity, suggesting that the reaction involves epimerization during reduction. This idea was supported by deuterium studies employing LiAlD_{4}, in which there was a substantial amount of product which had deuterium incorporated at the carbon alpha to the amine. Thus, Becker and Bergman's work demonstrated that the cyclopentadienylcobalt nitrosyl dimer could be used for 1,2-diamination of alkenes. Moreover, they correctly suggested that alkene activation occurred via the cyclopentadienylcobalt dinitrosyl intermediate.

== Cylcopentadienylcobalt dinitrosyl reactive intermediate ==
=== Mechanistic investigation ===
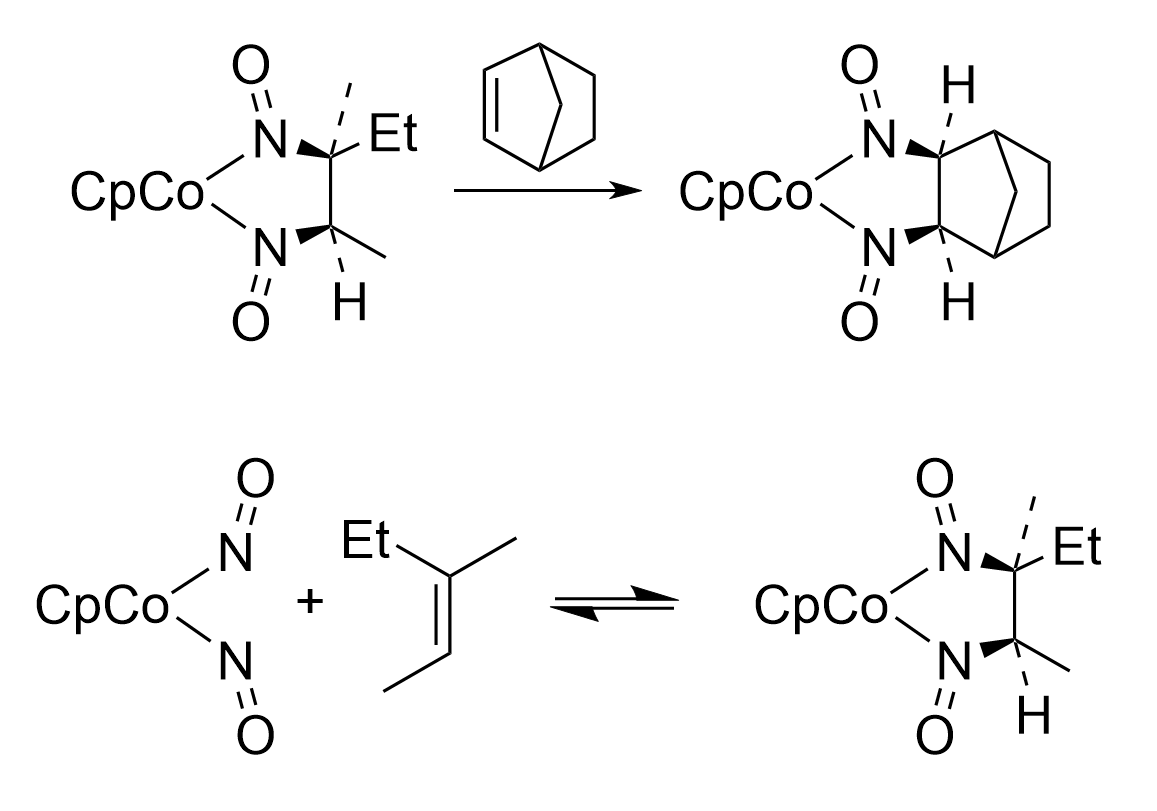
Reversibility of olefin binding with cyclopentadienyl cobaltdinitrosyl

Becker and Bergman published a detailed mechanistic investigation of the reaction between CpCo(NO)_{2} and olefins shortly after the above study. In this study they reveal that the cyclopentadienylcobalt dinitrosoalkane complex undergoes reversible exchange with alkenes. Kinetic and spectroscopic investigations allowed them to suggest the mechanism of alkene activation and reveal the monomeric cylcopentadienylcobalt dinitrosyl reactive intermediate.

Preparing a dinitrosoalkane complex with a simple unstrained olefin and introducing norbornene-type olefins, which allow for much more stable dinitrosoalkane complexes, led to the exchange of the olefins. The observation of this exchange reaction led to the simple mechanistic proposal wherein the reactive intermediate could reversibly bind with the acyclic olefin, or irreversibly bind with norbornene to form the more stable alkane complex. The corresponding rate expression was experimentally verified by varying the concentrations of norbornene and acyclic olefin. Bergman also showed that olefin exchange could occur photochemically.

When [CpCoNO]_{2} was placed in benzene it formed a dark green solution. However, upon introduction of NO gas, the solution turned into a lighter, brighter green color. Infrared spectroscopy revealed that this brighter solution has stretching frequencies of 1609 and 1690 cm^{−1}, as opposed to the dimer's frequencies at 1540 and 1590 cm^{−1}. The greater stretching frequencies supported the assignment of that species as the monomeric CpCo(NO)_{2} reactive intermediate. These IR stretches disappeared when the solution of the intermediate was treated with norbornene, further supporting its assignment.

The CpCo(NO)_{2} intermediate could be directly synthesized by treating Co((NO)_{2}-μ-Cl)_{2} with lithium cyclopentadienide in dimethoxyethane. CpCo(NO)_{2} still decomposed slowly, but was relatively stable under dilute conditions, as evinced by the UV/Vis spectrum remaining unchanged over 20 minutes. This solution was treated directly with olefin and resulted in the dinitrosoalkane complex. Additional studies with this reaction scheme showed that the rate was insensitive to the polarity of the solvent. Substitutions on the cyclopentadienyl did not affect the reactivity of the intermediate, but the permethylated ring reduced the thermal stability while ester substituents improved the stability. Overall, these studies suggested that the reaction between [CpCoNO]_{2} dimer and olefin is bimolecular. Mechanistically, since tetrasubstituted olefins were found to react with the dimer, Becker and Bergman concluded that the reaction cannot occur via olefin coordination to the cobalt, and instead occurs directly with nitrogen atoms of the nitrosyl group and the π bond of the olefin in a concerted fashion. Moreover, since exchange of the alkene results in the stereospecific release of the starting alkene, olefin exchange was suggested to occur via concerted C-N bond cleavage to produce diradicals which quickly combine to form the alkene.

=== Molecular orbital theory perspective ===
Bergman's work on CpCo(NO)_{2} suggested a likely mechanism of alkene binding, but it was still unusual that an organometallic transformation should proceed via ligand-based activation. Moreover, the structure of the reactive intermediate could not yet be determined. Roald Hoffmann provided a molecular orbital point of view to describe this reactivity and the possible structure.

Hoffmann produced a wavefunction of the highest occupied molecular orbital (HOMO) and found that the HOMO is largely located on the NO π* orbitals, and that these π* orbitals are able to engage in π back-bonding with Co. He identified several plausible structures of CpCo(NO)_{2}. One was a 20-electron species in which the NO ligands are linear and can be considered as LX-type because of the donation of the lone pair and the nitrogen-centered radical. Another was an 18-electron species in which one NO ligand behaves as the aforementioned LX ligand, and the other behaves as an X-type ligand and adopts the bent shape. Finally, if both NO ligands behave as X type ligands and adopt the bent conformation then the CpCo(NO)_{2} moiety has 16 electrons.

The conformation of the NO ligand and the corresponding electronic behavior can be understood in context of the nitric oxide molecular orbital diagram which has a nitrogen-centered radical residing in the degenerate p_{x}/p_{y} based molecular orbital and a lone pair residing in the p_{z} based orbital. These orbitals are the HOMO and HOMO-1 respectively. When the NO ligand only uses the radical in bonding with the Co center and behaves as an X ligand there is no need for the Co-N-O to be linear since the p_{x}/p_{y} orbitals are orthogonal to the nuclear axis of N-O. When the NO ligand uses the p_{z}-based lone pair in bonding then the nuclear axis of N-O must coincide with the Co-N nuclear axis.

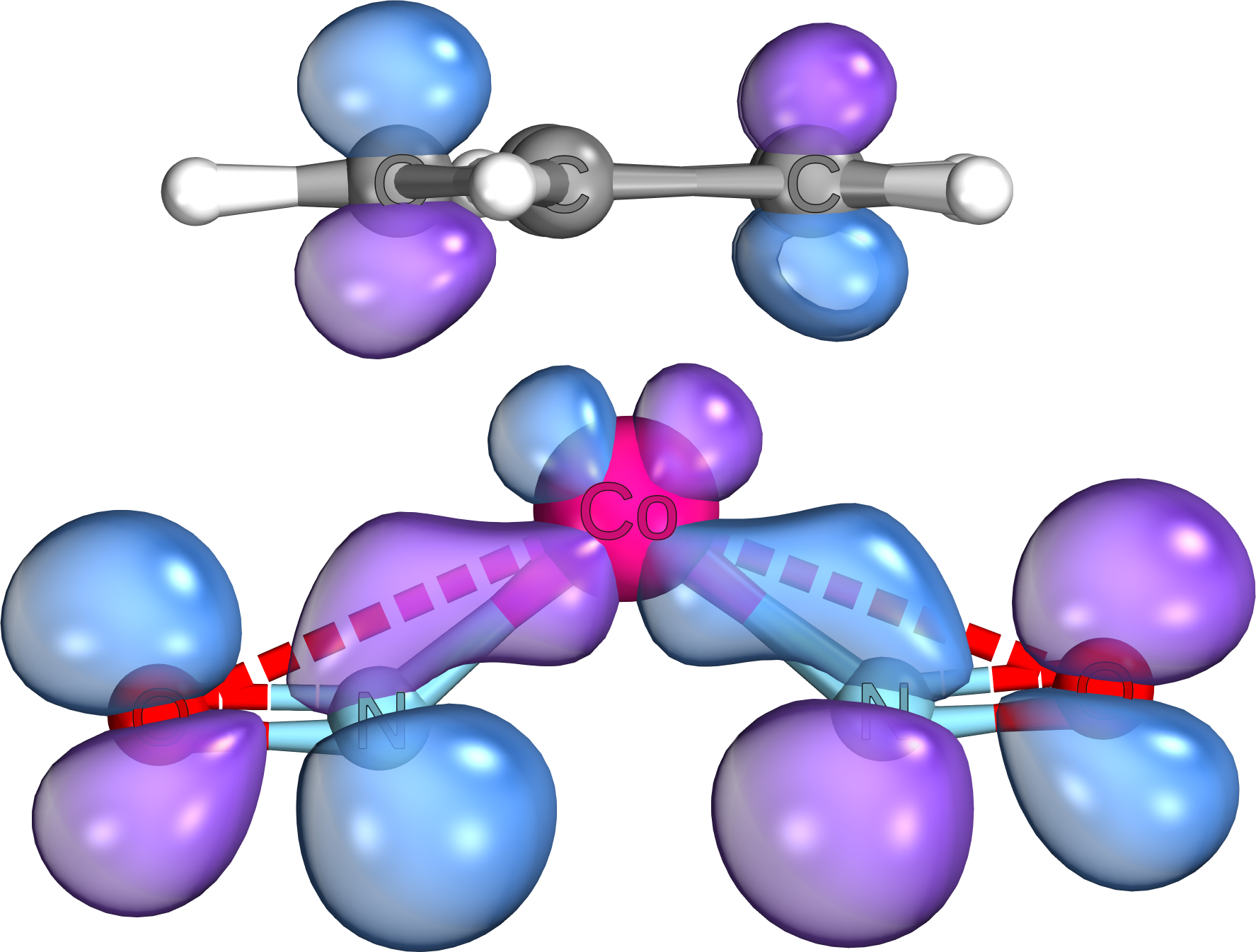
CpCo(NO)_{2} HOMO

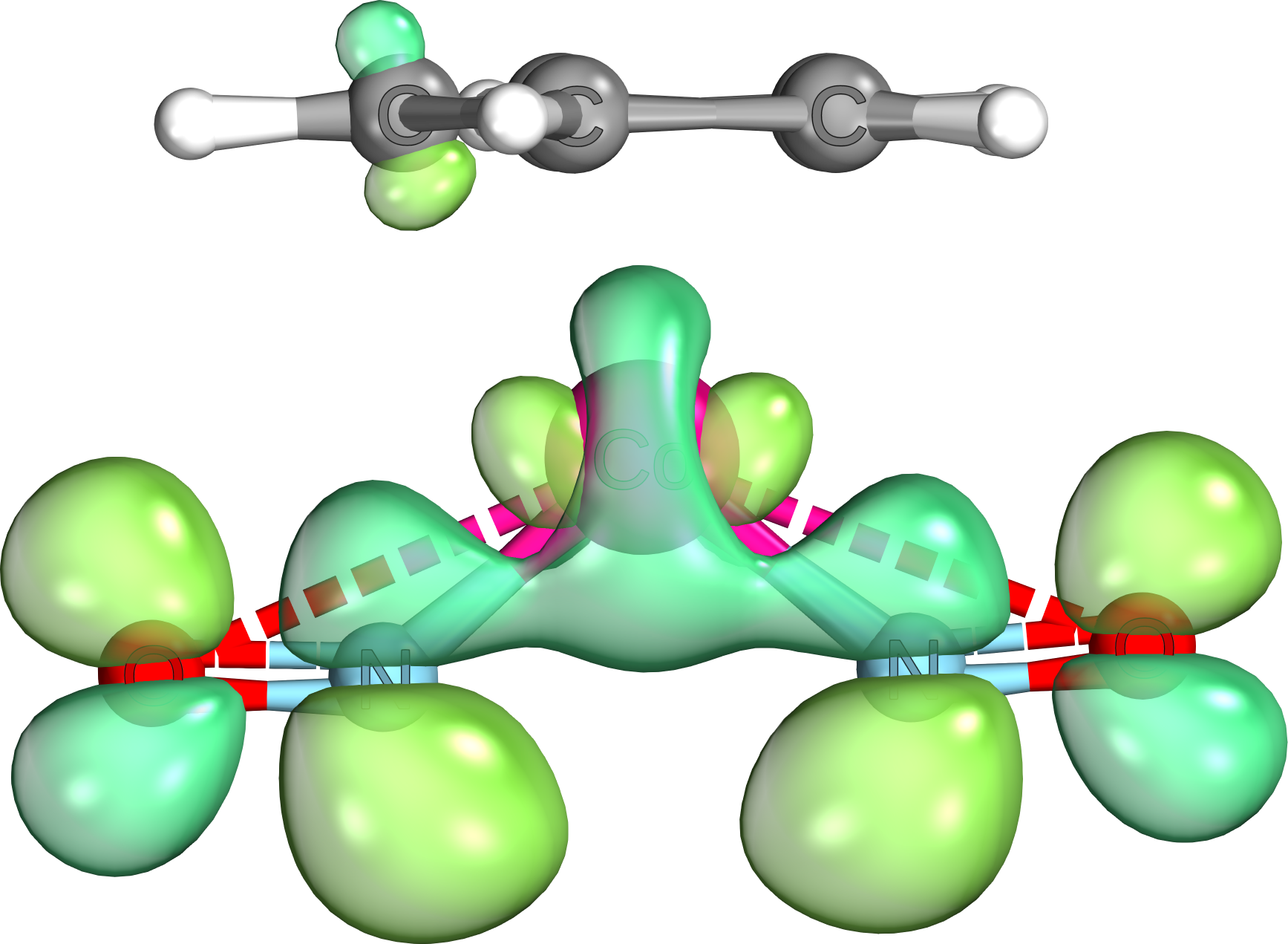
CpCo(NO)_{2} LUMO

The 18-electron species, while it satisfies the 18-electron rule, has less symmetry than the 16-electron species wherein both nitrosyl ligands are bent. Indeed, a Walsh diagram detailing the conformational change from linear NO ligands to bent NO ligands shows that the LUMO and HOMO centered on the NO π* orbitals decreases in energy. Hoffmann attributed this observation to the loss of antibonding overlap between the metal and nitrosyl orbitals. A contour plot of the wavefunction of the CpCo(NO)_{2} HOMO and LUMO in the bent conformation shows that the HOMO is antisymmetric with respect to the plane perpendicular to the N-Co-N plane, and the LUMO is symmetric with respect to this axis. The electronic structure of the HOMO and LUMO can have the appropriate symmetry to interact with an olefin. The π* orbital of the olefin can interact with the antisymmetric HOMO, and the π orbital can interact with the symmetric LUMO for an overall stabilizing interaction. This HOMO of the resulting dinitrosoalkane then becomes the d_{xz} orbital of Co, and the LUMO becomes the π* NO orbitals. This description of the LUMO explained why the reduction of the dinitrosoalkane complex lead to diamination, the LUMO was centered on the nitrosyl ligands and thus they underwent reduction Finally, while Hoffman showed that the 16-electron doubly-bent nitrosyl conformation was more stable than the linear 20-electron complex, the 18-electron complex in which one nitrosyl is bent and one is linear was put forth as another probable conformation.

=== Molecular orbital theory of [CpCoNO]_{2} ===
A similar study on electronic structure and molecular orbital theory was conducted on the dimer complex. Fenske concluded that the dimer's metal-ligand interactions are characterized by the metal orbitals interacting with both bridging nitrosyl's 2 π-acceptor orbitals and 5 σ orbitals. By comparison with other metal dimers with isoelectronic ligands such as CO, it was determined that the nature of the bridge ligands more strongly influences the electronic structure of the dimer than the identity of the metal. Moreover, because the electronic structure is determined by the ligands rather than the metal center, Fenske suggested that the ligands dictate the metal-metal separation of the dimer. Indeed, similar organometallic transformations were observed with Rhodium analogues of the CpCo(NO)_{2}, supporting this observation.

== C-H functionalization ==
=== Addition of Michael acceptors ===
The synthetic utility of cyclopentadienylcobalt dinitrosyl was limited to 1,2-diamination until Bergman & Toste expanded this methodology in 2008 by showing that C-C bonds could be formed between the dinitrosoalkane complex and Michael acceptors. The reversibility of alkene binding was already established from Bergman's earlier work, but here Bergman showed that the dinitrosoalkane complex could be functionalized prior to release, while leaving the nitrosyl ligands intact. The proposed procedure entailed preparing the dintrosoalkane, and then treating with base to afford the nitro-nitroso intermediate. This intermediate then adds to the Michael acceptor to give the functionalized complex. Finally, this undergoes a retrocycloaddition reaction with unfunctionalized olefin to afford the dinitrosoalkane and release the functionalized alkene.

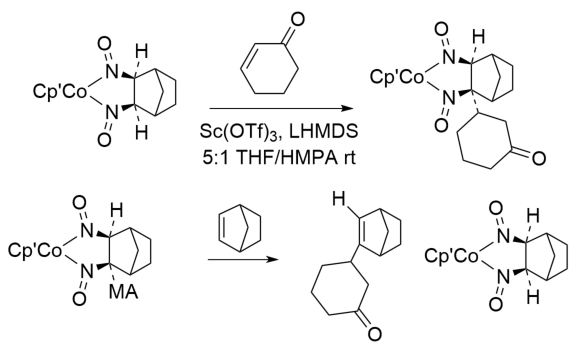
Michael acceptor addition and functionalized alkene release

This reaction was developed by first reacting a silylated cobalt dinitrosoalkane with a Michael acceptor in the presence of a fluoride source. The fluoride source desilylated the substrate and produced the carbanion which could serve as the nucleophile in reaction with the Michael acceptor. Eventually, the reaction could be performed with a base (LHMDS) and Lewis acid (Sc(OTf)_{3}) promoter to produce the carbanion. The reaction scope included 2-cyclohexen-1-one or phenyl vinyl sufone as Michael acceptors. In line with previous observations, ring-strained alkenes such as norbornene gave the greatest yield of both the functionalized dinitrosoalkane, as well as the released functionalized alkane. Most functionalizations were highly selective for the diastereomer which had the Michael acceptor in the endo position. Additionally most reactions resulted in functionalization of only one side of the olefin, although the phenyl vinyl sulfone was more prone to bind to both sides of the olefin. Although the original olefin could be exchanged for the functionalized olefin, the process was not yet catalytic.

If there is an intramolecular Michael acceptor, then the Michael addition may proceed via a one-pot synthesis where the olefin undergoes cyclization via addition with the Michael acceptor. This reaction has been made catalytic with 20 mol% CpCo(NO)_{2} and 10 mol% base. Whereas other reactions could not be made catalytic because of base-mediated decomposition of CpCo(NO)_{2} and/or dimerization of the intermediate, the cyclization reaction benefits from the fact that once the olefin binds to the CpCo(NO)_{2} and the base generates the nitro-nitroso alkane, the nucleophile can quickly react with the Michael acceptor intramolecularly.

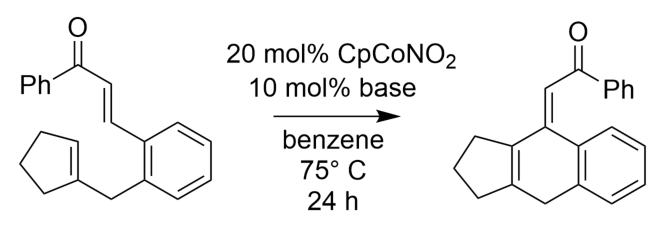
Catalytic intramolecular Michael acceptor addition with CpCoNO_{2}

=== Enantioselective addition of Michael acceptors ===
Bergman & Toste had previously demonstrated that the use of base and a Lewis acid with CpCo(NO)_{2} could facilitate the addition of Michael acceptors. This addition was performed with relatively high diastereomeric ratios for norbornene which favored addition to the endo position. Moreover, when using an enol as the acceptor, a norbornene which had a ring substituent in the endo position gave 0% yield whereas when the ring was in the exo position they achieved 73% yield. However the retrocycloaddition reaction which released the functionalized alkene could not yet be conducted in a manner that transferred the chirality preference of the dinitrosoalkane. These results as well as Brunner's initial observation that norbornene tended to coordinate with the protons occupying the endo position, had suggested that CpCo(NO)_{2} could mediate enantioselective transformations.

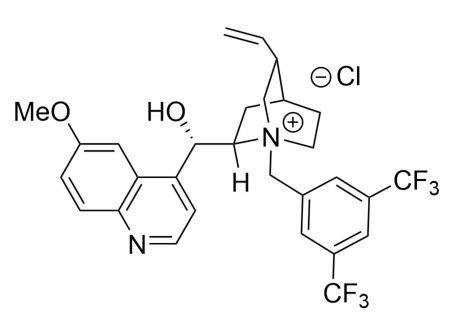
N-benzylated ammonium chloride salt

Bergman & Toste developed a method for asymmetric functionalization of olefins. Their methodological approach entailed using chiral N-benzylated ammonium chloride salts. These salts could serve a similar function as the Lewis acid promoter in their previous studies but with the added benefit of being chiral. Colder temperatures, the use of η5 -(t BuMe_{2}Si)C_{5}H_{4} instead of Cp, and the premixing of the base and salt lad to an enantiomeric excess of 83% for the formation of the norbornene-enol complex. The premixing of the base and salt was thought to lead to a chiral base, and the bulkier Cp ligand reinforced the enantiomeric selectivity. Additionally, using salts with trifluoromethyl groups allowed for further optimization. With these conditions the initial norbornene functionalization proceeded with quantitative diastereomeric selectivity and the enol Michael acceptor occupied the endo position. The subsequent retrocycloaddition could then be performed to release the functionalized alkene with as high as 85% enantiomeric excess.

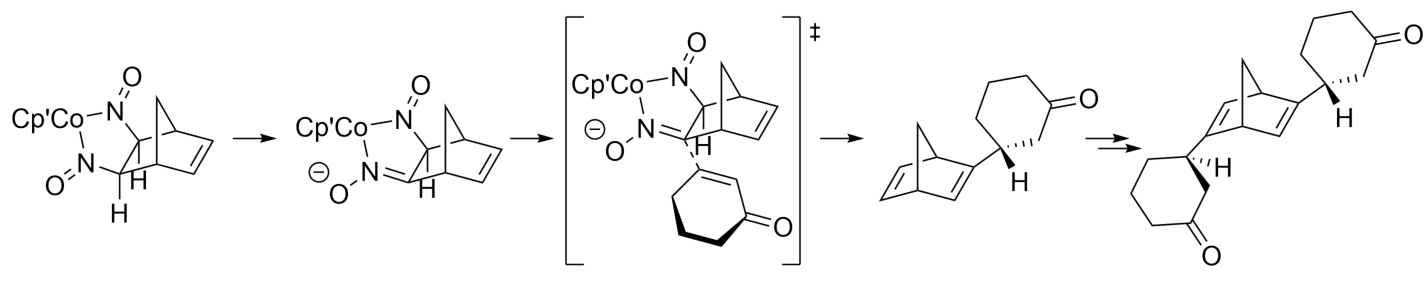
Cobalt mediated enantioselective synthesis of dienes

This methodology was expanded to diene substrates such as norbornadiene. These ring strained dienes allowed for sequential, stereoselective, Michael addition. The double Michael addition proceeds as follows: the first Michael addition proceeds as expected, then an isomerization occurs in which the enol moves from the α-nitroso position to the γ-nitroso position on the opposite side of the norbornadiene. This isomerization reaction thus prepares a new α-nitroso position for functionalization. The second Michael addition is then followed by the retrocylcoaddition of another norbornadiene to ultimately release the functionalized diene. The product distribution favored anti-addition of the enol, such that the product had C_{2} symmetry. The syn-addition resulted in the C_{1} diene. The anti:syn ratio ranged from 3.7-11:1 and the enantiomeric excess of the anti project ranged from 90-96%, with the enol's maintaining R stereochemistry at the B-position of the ketone. The enantioselectivity could be switched (from R,R,R,R to S,S,S,S) by employing an N-benzylated ammonium chloride salt which had opposite stereochemistry at the alcohol bearing carbon.

The origin of the stereoselectivity is proposed to be the loss of symmetry of the dinitrosoalkane complex upon reaction with base. As is the case with other reactions with Michael acceptors, the reaction with base produces the nitroso-nitro intermediate. The exo position of the CpCo(NO)_{2} moiety favors an approach of the enol such that the major diastereomer is the one in which the β-position of the ketone adopts R stereochemistry. This proposal, however, does not account for the role of the chiral salt and the resulting chiral base. This methodology ultimately allowed for the enantioselective synthesis of C_{1} and C_{2} symmetric dienes. It is different from the other C-H functionalization reactions in that it relies on the use of chiral salts and allows for C-H functionalization of multiple sites via an isomerization reaction.

=== Annulation ===
Schomaker et al. demonstrated that CpCo(NO)_{2} could mediate (3+2)-annulation of alkenes with α,β-unsaturated ketones and imines. The approach is similar to the reactions with Michael acceptors. The advancement in this work is that the dinitrosoalkane could undergo sequential deprotonation to produce in the vinyl dianion. This was achieved by using two equivalents of base. In Schomaker's proposed mechanism, one vinyl anion will attack the -ene portion of an enone while the other vinyl anion will attack the -one portion to produce the alcohol of the enone in an overall annulation (3+2) reaction. This annulation product could be released by retrocycloaddition with a ring-strained alkene such as norbornene, as demonstrated previously.
