= Alkyne trimerisation =

Chemical reaction of three alkynes to form a benzene ring

An alkyne trimerisation is a [2+2+2] cycloaddition reaction in which three alkyne units (C≡C) react to form a benzene ring. The reaction requires a metal catalyst. The process is of historic interest as well as being applicable to organic synthesis. Being a cycloaddition reaction, it has high atom economy. Many variations have been developed, including cyclisation of mixtures of alkynes and alkenes as well as alkynes and nitriles.

== Mechanism and stereochemistry ==
Trimerisation of acetylene to benzene is highly exergonic, proceeding with a free energy change of 142 kcal/mol at room temperature. Kinetic barriers however prevent the reaction from proceeding smoothly. The breakthrough came in 1948, when Walter Reppe and W. J. Schweckendiek reported their wartime results showing that nickel compounds are effective catalysts:

3 RC_{2}H → C_{6}R_{3}H_{3}

Since this discovery, many other cyclotrimerisations have been reported.

=== Mechanism ===
In terms of mechanism, the reactions begin with the formation of metal-alkyne complexes. The combination of two alkynes within the coordination sphere affords a metallacyclopentadiene. Starting from the metallacyclopentadiene intermediate, many pathways can be considered including metallocycloheptatrienes, metallanorbornadienes, and a more complicated structure featuring a carbenoid ligand.

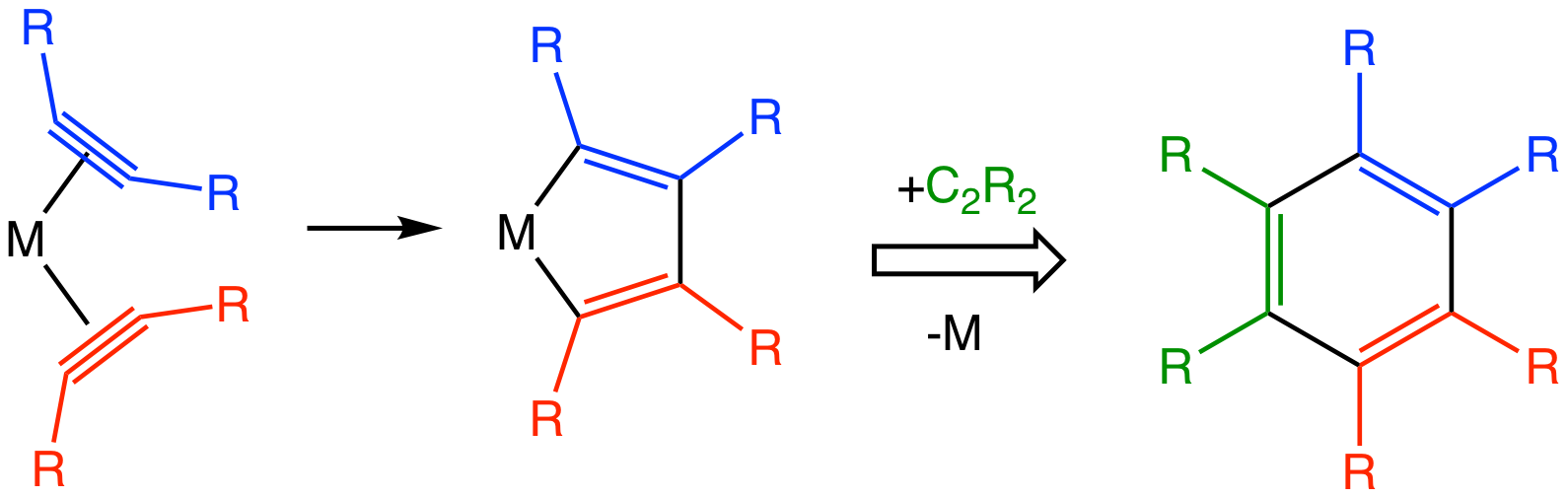
Simplified mechanism for metal-catalyzed trimerisation of alkynes

Catalysts used include cyclopentadienylcobalt dicarbonyl and Wilkinson's catalyst.

=== Stereochemistry and regiochemistry ===
Trimerisation of unsymmetrical alkynes gives two isomeric benzenes. For example, phenylacetylene affords both 1,3,5- and 1,2,4-C_{6}R_{3}H_{3}. The substitution pattern about the product arene is determined in two steps: formation of the metallocyclopentadiene intermediate and incorporation of the third equivalent of alkyne. Steric bulk on the alkyne coupling partners and catalyst have been invoked as the controlling elements of regioselectivity.

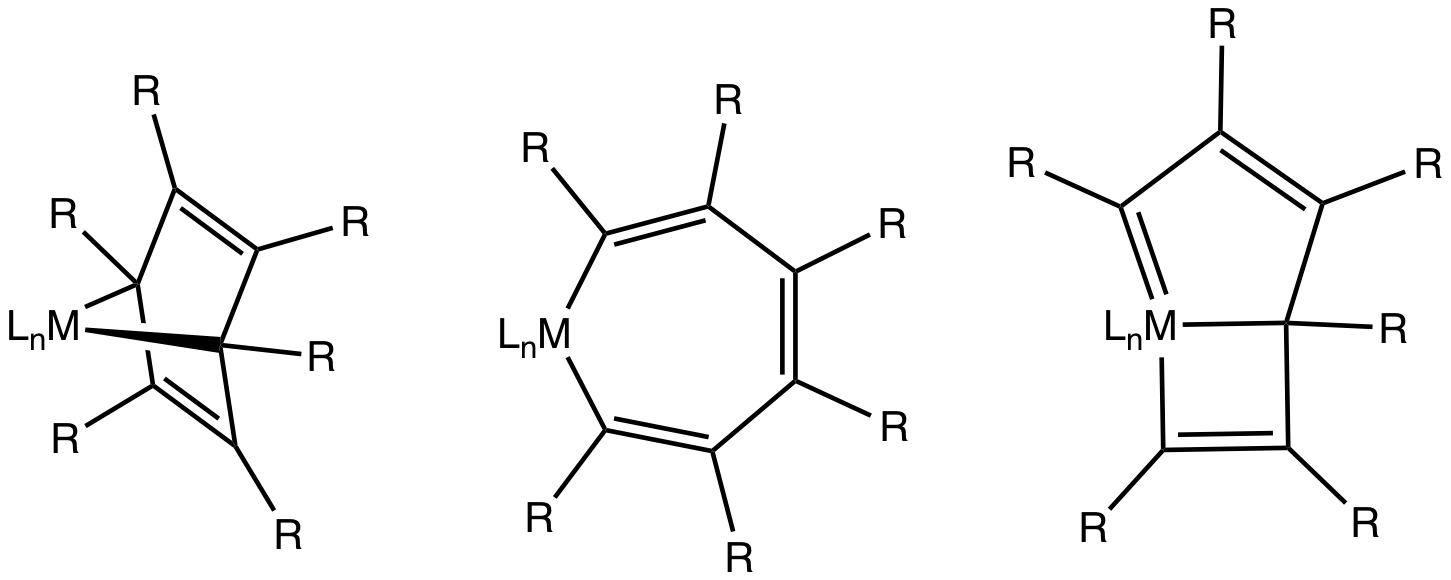
Three proposed intermediates in alkyne trimerization.

Chiral catalysts have been employed in combination with arynes to produce non-racemic atropisomeric products.

=== Scope and limitations ===
Catalysts for cyclotrimerisation are selective for triple bonds, which gives the reaction a fairly wide substrate scope. Many functional groups are tolerated. Regioselective intermolecular trimerization of unsymmetrical alkynes remains an unsolved problem.

Perhaps the most useful development in this area, at least from the commercial perspective is the cotrimerization of nitriles and alkynes. This reaction is a practical route to some substituted pyridines.

Some catalysts are deactivated by formation of stable, 18-electron η^{4}-complexes. Cyclobutadiene, cyclohexadiene, and arene complexes have all been observed as off-cycle, inactivated catalysts. In addition to high-order polymers and dimers and trimers, which originate from low regio- and chemoselectivities, enyne side products derived from alkyne dimerisation have been observed. Rhodium catalysts are particularly adept at enyne formation (see below). For nickel catalysis, formation of larger rings (particularly cyclooctatetraene) can be a problem.

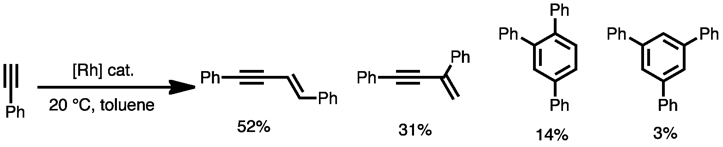

== Synthetic applications ==
The cotrimerization of alkynes and nitriles in the presence of organocobalt catalysts has been commercialized for the production of substituted pyridines.

Cyclization involving substrates in which some or all of the alkyne units are tethered together can provide fused ring systems. The length of the tether(s) controls the sizes of the additional rings. Addition of a 1,5-diyne with an alkyne produces a benzocyclobutene, a strained structure that can then be induced to undergo further reactions.

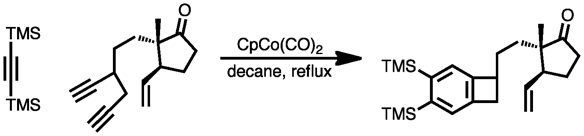

All three alkyne units can be tethered, leading to creation of three rings in a single step, with each of the two additional ring sizes controlled by the respective tether lengths.

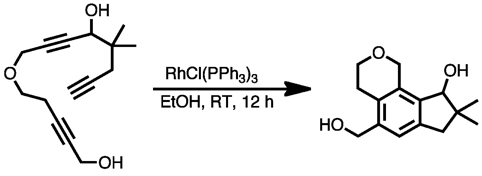

Crowded triynes can cyclize to products exhibiting helical chirality. In one example remarkable for the formation of three new aromatic rings in one step, the triyne shown is transformed into the helical product via treatment with cyclopentadienylcobalt dicarbonyl. As of 2004, this process had yet to be rendered asymmetric, but the products could be separated through chiral HPLC. Cyclisation carried out with a diyne and a separate alkyne affords greater control. Using commercially available cyclopentadienylcobalt dicarbonyl, CpCo(CO)_{2}, as catalyst, bis(trimethylsilyl)acetylene (BTMSA) will react with a diyne-1,2-disubstituted benzene to form an anthroquinone aromatic system:

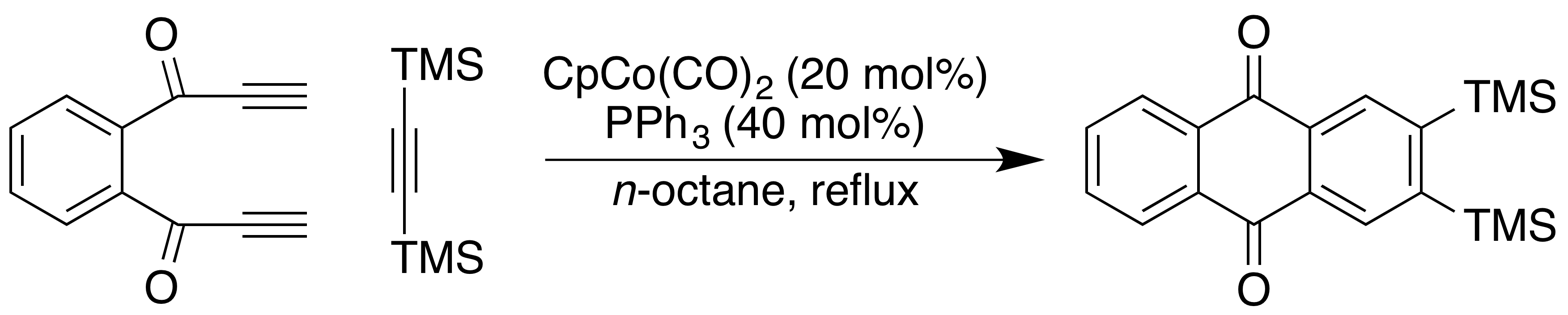

Benzyne, generated in situ from a benzene ring bearing ortho-distributed triflate and trimethylsilyl substituents, can be used to generate an aryne in place of an acetylene and combined with a suitable diyne. Such a benzene derivative reacts with 1,7-octadiyne in the presence of a suitable catalyst to generate a naphthalene system. This is an example of a hexadehydro Diels–Alder reaction.

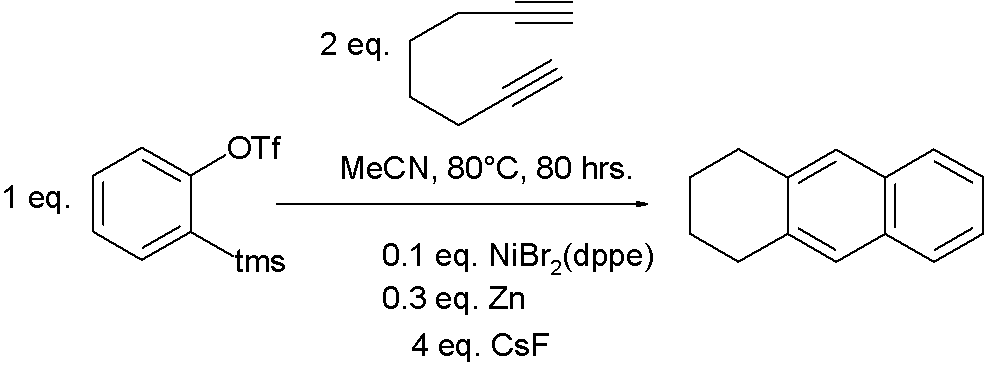

Trimerisation of three 2-butyne (dimethylacetylene) molecules yields hexamethylbenzene. The reaction is catalyzed by triphenylchromium tri-tetrahydrofuranate or by a complex of triisobutylaluminium and titanium tetrachloride.

Trimerisation of three diphenylacetylene molecules yields hexaphenylbenzene. The reaction is catalyzed by dicobalt octacarbonyl.

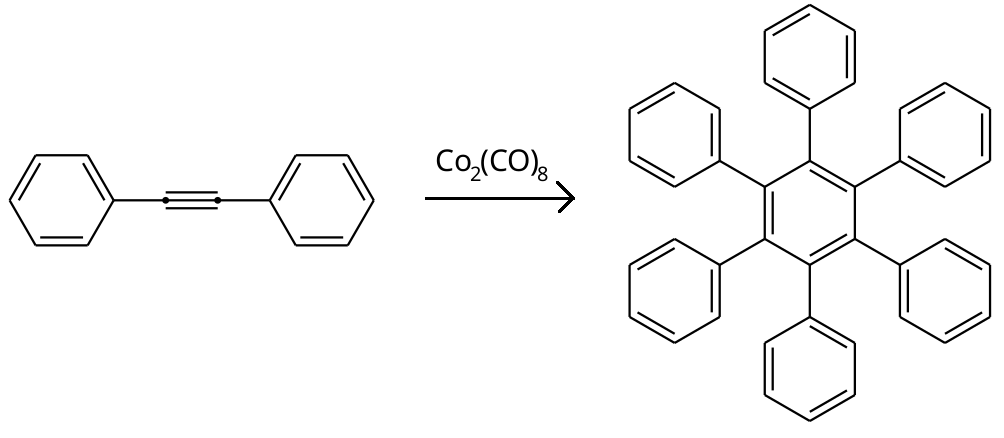

== Comparison with other methods ==
Cyclotrimerization presents an alternative to the functionalization of pre-formed aromatic compounds through electrophilic or nucleophilic substitution, the regioselectivity of which can sometimes be difficult to control.

Other methods for the direct formation of aromatic rings from substituted, unsaturated precursors include the Dötz reaction, palladium-catalyzed [4+2] benzannulation of enynes with alkynes, and Lewis-acid-mediated [4+2] cycloaddition of enynes with alkynes. Cyclization of transient benzyne species with alkynes, catalyzed by palladium, can also produce substituted aromatic compounds.

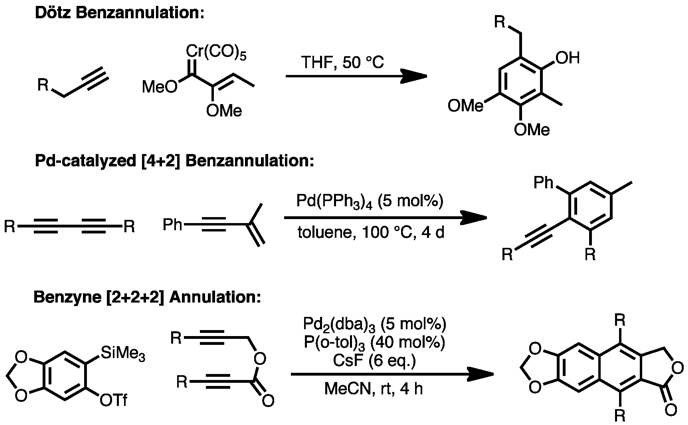
