= Zirconocene =

Names
- IUPAC name Bis(η^{5}-cyclopentadienyl)zirconium
- Other names * Bis(η^{5}-cyclopentadienyl)zirconium(II): Di(cyclopentadienyl)zirconium; [(η^{5}-C_{5}H_{5})_{2}Zr]; [(Cp)_{2}Zr]

Identifiers
CAS Number	12116-83-5
3D model (JSmol)	Interactive image
- InChI: InChI=1S/2C5H5.Zr/c2*1-2-4-5-3-1;/h2*1-5H;/q2*-1;+2 Key: IDASTKMEQGPVRR-UHFFFAOYSA-N
- SMILES: [CH-]1C=CC=C1.[CH-]1C=CC=C1.[Zr+2]

Properties
Chemical formula	C_{10}H_{10}Zr
Molar mass	221.40 g·mol^{−1}
- Except where otherwise noted, data are given for materials in their standard state (at 25 °C [77 °F], 100 kPa). Infobox references

Zirconocene is a hypothetical compound with 14 valence electrons, which has not been observed or isolated. It is an organometallic compound consisting of two cyclopentadienyl rings bound on a central zirconium atom. A crucial question in research is what kind of ligands can be used to stabilize the Cp_{2}Zr^{II} metallocene fragment to make it available for further reactions in organic synthesis.

== Structure ==
In contrast to sandwich compounds that have parallel cyclopentadienyl rings bound on opposite sides of the metal atom, such as ferrocene, zirconocene and other group 4 metallocenes are bent. Without stabilizing ligands, the Cp_{2}Zr^{II} fragment is unstable and dimerizes to form a fulvalene complex.

Bent geometry of group 4 metallocene compounds as stabilized by two additional ligands (X)

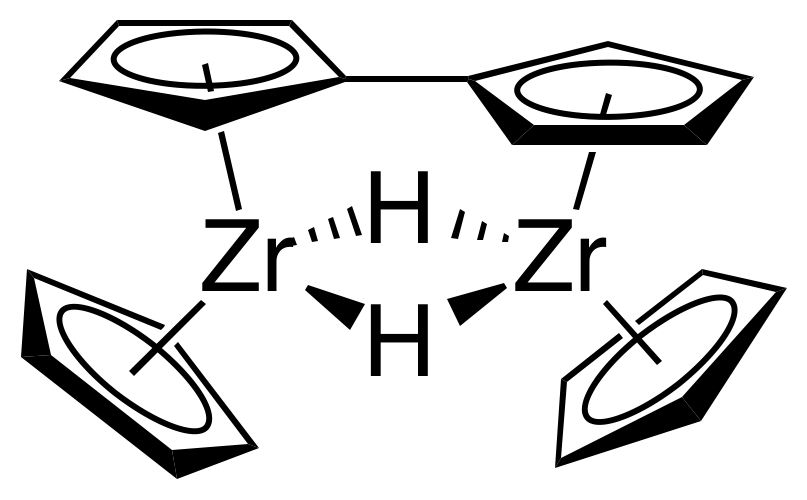
Dimer with bridging fulvalene that forms from zirconocene without additional ligands

== History ==
In 1954, Wilkinson and Birmingham described zirconocene dihalides Cp_{2}ZrX_{2} with X=Cl or Br, as some of the earliest examples of organozirconium compounds. The chemistry of Cp_{2}Zr^{II}-compounds was explored more extensively in the 1980s by Negishi, Takahashi, Buchwald, and others. In the 1990s, Rosenthal synthesized zirconocene reagents using bis(trimethylsilyl)acetylene as stabilizing ligand. This novel zirconocene source offers a number of compelling advantages over previously used reagents and broadens the range of possible reactions. The chemistry of Cp_{2}Zr^{II}-compounds is still a rapid growing area with zirconium being ranked among the most widely used transition metals in organic synthesis.

== Synthesis ==
The unstable 14-electron Cp_{2}Zr^{II}-compound is generally non-existent, but can be generated using ligands that stabilize the metallocene fragment. Optimally, these ligands can be quantitatively released under mild conditions.

One option is the usage of π-acceptor ligands like carbon monoxide. Furthermore, a reaction with trimethylphosphine yields Cp_{2}Zr^{II}-complex as illustrated below.

In the synthesis of the Negishi reagent, treatment of zirconocene dichloride in tetrahydrofuran with two equivalents of n-butyllithium at −78 °C gives (1-butene)zirconocene, which is represented by the resonance structures A and B.

If bis(trimethylsilyl)acetylene is used instead of n-butyllithium, a higher yield is can be obtained. In this case, zirconocene complexes are synthesized to Rosenthal's reagent, represented by the resonance structures A and B. This reagent is stable at room temperature, can be stored under an inert atmosphere and allows a more precise control over the stoichiometry of reactions as it can be formed quantitatively. A fine tune of the general reaction shown below is feasible by using different substituted cyclopentadienyl ligands as well as additional ligands (e. g. THF, pyridine). Instead of zirconium used as central atom, an analogous reaction with titanium is possible, too.

== Reactions ==
The highly reactive Cp_{2}Zr^{II} compound possesses one lone electron pair and two vacant valence orbitals. Therefore, it can be compared to carbenes in terms of its reactivity. Typical reactions of in situ generated zirconocenes are coupling or insertion to form metallacycles. These reactions have been observed upon addition of carbon monoxide, ketones, nitriles, alkynes and other substances and led to five-, seven- and nine-membered metallacycles.

== Applications ==
Zirconocene coupling and insertion are used extensively to generate functionalized organic compounds. Taking Rosenthal's reagent, high yields of predictable macrocyclic products can be obtained. These macrocycles are applicated in numerous ways, such as host–guest chemistry, chemical sensing, catalysis, and materials science. Moreover, with zirconocene complexes, the synthesis of so far unknown heterometallacycles and synthetically challenging organic structures can be realized by novel C-C coupling of nitriles.
