= Cyclopentadienylcobalt dicarbonyl =

Cyclopentadienyl cobalt dicarbonyl

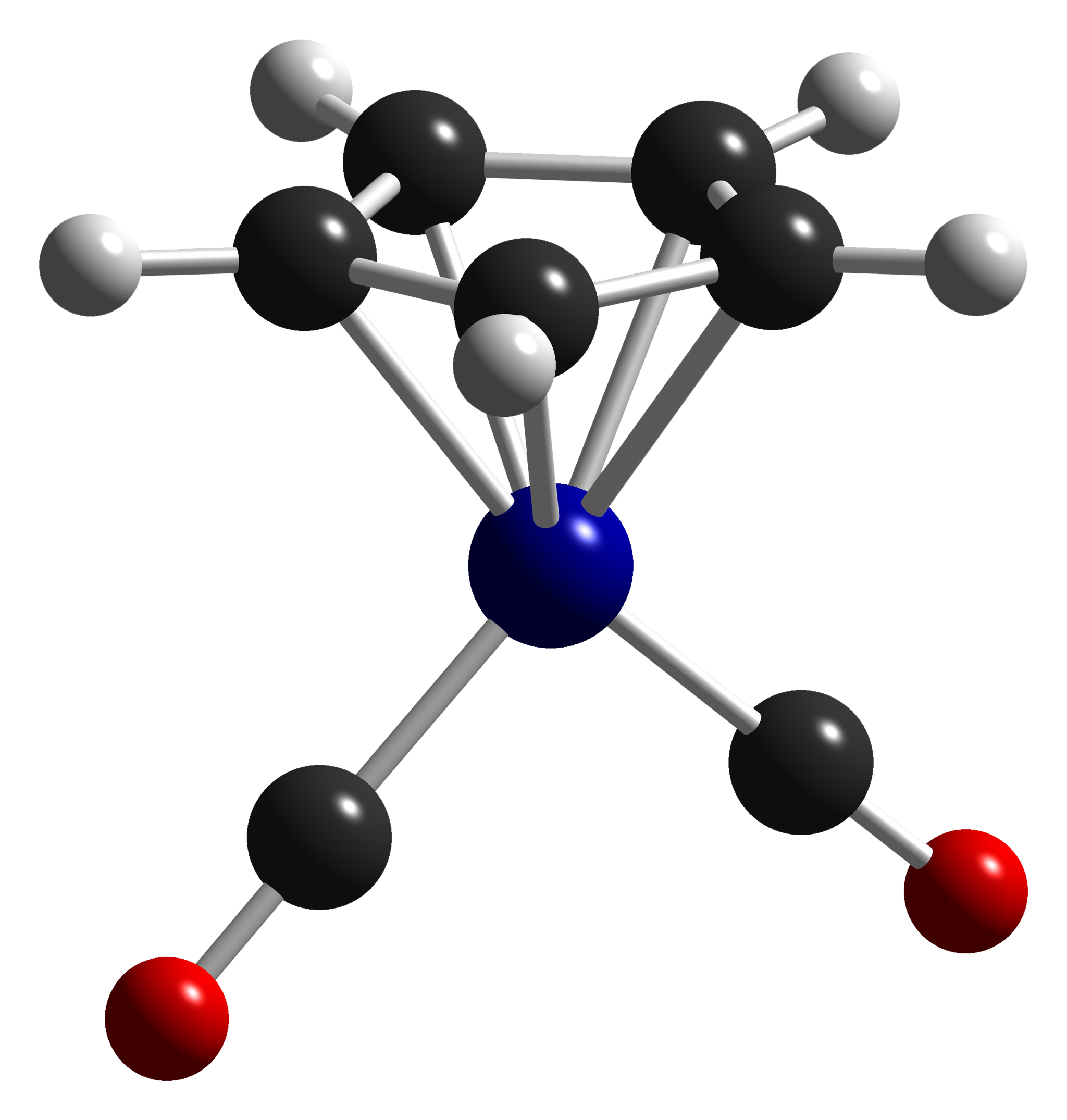

Identifiers
CAS Number	12078-25-0
3D model (JSmol)	Interactive image
ChemSpider	10158732
ECHA InfoCard	100.031.933
EC Number	235-139-8
PubChem CID	11986239
- InChI: InChI=1S/C5H5.2CO.Co/c1-2-4-5-3-1;2*1-2;/h1-5H;;;/q-1;;; Key: AEVRNKXPLOTCBW-UHFFFAOYSA-N; InChI=1/C5H5.2CO.Co/c1-2-4-5-3-1;2*1-2;/h1-5H;;;/q-1;;; Key: AEVRNKXPLOTCBW-UHFFFAOYAD
- SMILES: [cH-]1cccc1.[O+]#C[Co-](C#[O+])

Properties
Chemical formula	CpCo(CO)_{2}
Molar mass	180.05 g/mol
Appearance	Dark red to black liquid
Density	1.35 g/cm^{3}
Melting point	−22 °C (−8 °F; 251 K)
Boiling point	139 to 140 °C (282 to 284 °F; 412 to 413 K) (710 mmHg); 37-38.5 °C (2 mmHg)
Solubility in water	Insoluble

Hazards
- GHS labelling
Pictograms	(GHS02: Flammable) (GHS06: Toxic) (GHS08: Health hazard)
Signal word	Danger
Hazard statements	H226, H301, H311, H331, H334, H341, H351, H412
Flash point	26.7 °C (80.1 °F; 299.8 K)
- Except where otherwise noted, data are given for materials in their standard state (at 25 °C [77 °F], 100 kPa). verify (what is ?) Infobox references

Cyclopentadienylcobalt dicarbonyl is an organocobalt compound with formula (C_{5}H_{5})Co(CO)_{2}, abbreviated CpCo(CO)_{2}. It is an example of a half-sandwich complex. It is a dark red air sensitive liquid. This compound features one cyclopentadienyl ring that is bound in an η^{5}-manner and two carbonyl ligands. The compound is soluble in common organic solvents.

== Preparation ==
CpCo(CO)_{2} was first reported in 1954 by Piper, Cotton, and Wilkinson who produced it by the reaction of cobalt carbonyl with cyclopentadiene. It is prepared commercially by the same method:

Co_{2}(CO)_{8} + 2 C_{5}H_{6} → 2 C_{5}H_{5}Co(CO)_{2} + H_{2} + 4 CO

Alternatively, it is generated by the high pressure carbonylation of bis(cyclopentadienyl)cobalt (cobaltocene) at elevated temperature and pressures:

Co(C_{5}H_{5})_{2} + 2 CO → C_{5}H_{5}Co(CO)_{2} + "C_{5}H_{5}"

The compound is identified by strong bands in its IR spectrum at 2030 and 1960 cm^{−1}.

== Reactions ==
CpCo(CO)_{2} catalyzes the cyclotrimerization of alkynes. The catalytic cycle begins with dissociation of one CO ligand forming bis(alkyne) intermediate.

CpCo(CO)_{2} + 2 R_{2}C_{2} → CpCo(R_{2}C_{2})_{2} + 2 CO

This reaction proceeds by formation of metal-alkyne complexes by dissociation of CO. Although monoalkyne complexes CpCo(CO)(R^{1}C_{2}R^{2}) have not been isolated, their analogues, CpCo(PPh_{3})(R^{1}C_{2}R^{2}) are made by the following reactions:

CpCo(CO)_{2} + PR_{3} → CO + CpCo(CO)(PR_{3})
CpCoL(PR_{3}) + R_{2}C_{2} → L + CpCo(PR_{3})(R_{2}C_{2}) (where L = CO or PR_{3})

CpCo(CO)_{2} catalyzes the formation of pyridines from a mixture of alkynes and nitriles. Reduction of CpCo(CO)_{2} with sodium yields the dinuclear radical [Cp_{2}Co_{2}(CO)_{2}]^{−}, which reacts with alkyl halides to give the dialkyl complexes [Cp_{2}Co_{2}(CO)_{2}R_{2}]. Ketones are produced by carbonylation of these dialkyl complexes, regenerating CpCo(CO)_{2}.

== Related compounds ==
The pentamethylcyclopentadienyl analogue Cp*Co(CO)_{2} (CAS RN#12129-77-0) is well studied. The Rh and Ir analogues, CpRh(CO)_{2} (CAS RN#12192-97-1) and CpIr(CO)_{2} (CAS RN#12192-96-0), are also well known.
