= Bis(trimethylsilyl)acetylene =

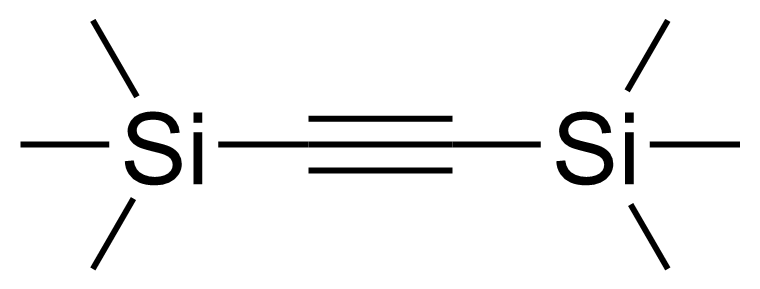

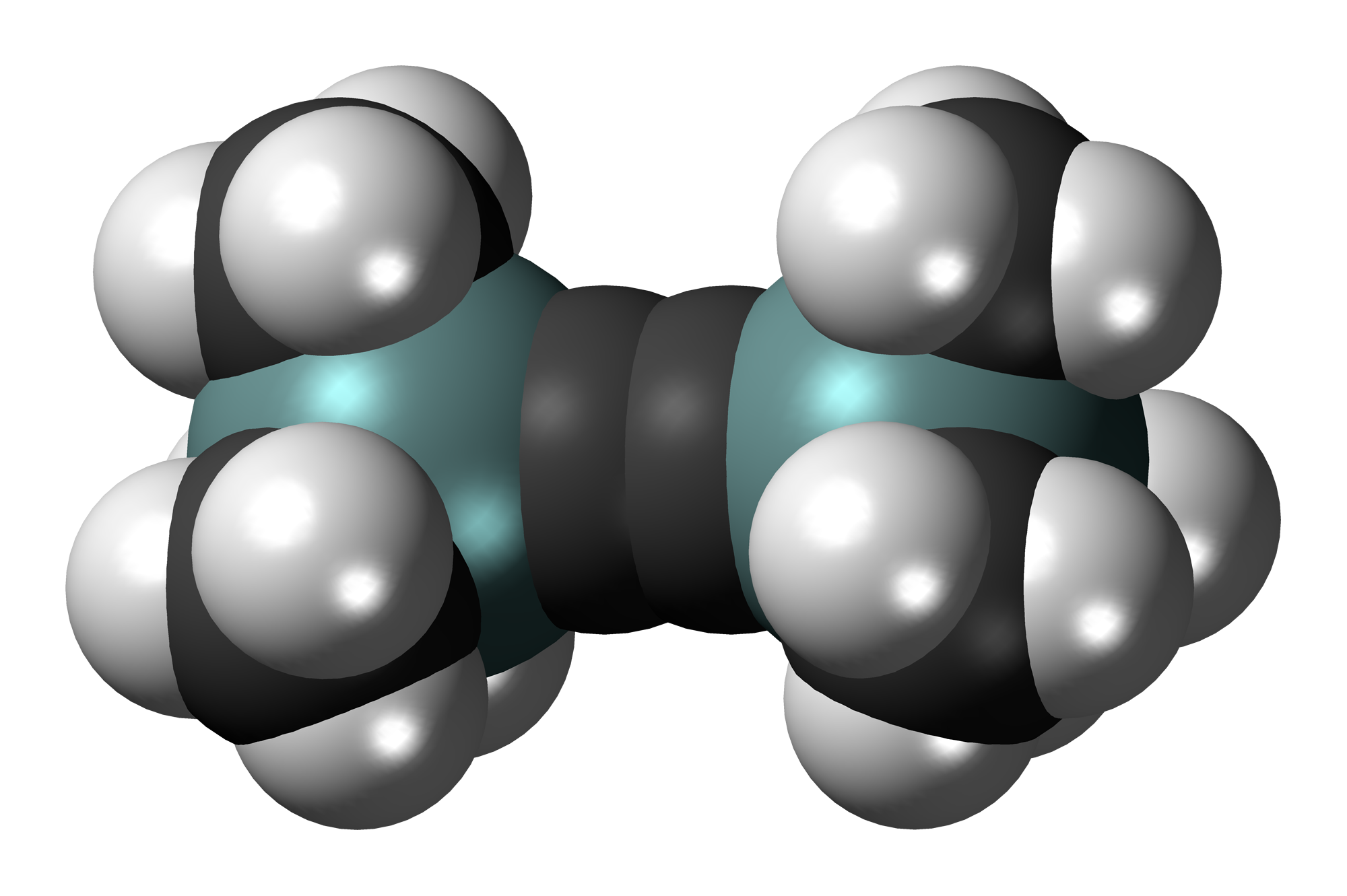

Names
- Preferred IUPAC name Ethynediylbis(trimethylsilane)
- Other names BTMSA

Identifiers
CAS Number	14630-40-1
3D model (JSmol)	Interactive image
ChemSpider	76286
ECHA InfoCard	100.035.141
PubChem CID	84564
CompTox Dashboard (EPA)	DTXSID3065798
- InChI: InChI=1S/C8H18Si2/c1-9(2,3)7-8-10(4,5)6/h1-6H3 Key: ZDWYFWIBTZJGOR-UHFFFAOYSA-N; InChI=1/C8H18Si2/c1-9(2,3)7-8-10(4,5)6/h1-6H3 Key: ZDWYFWIBTZJGOR-UHFFFAOYAF
- SMILES: C(#C[Si](C)(C)C)[Si](C)(C)C

Properties
Chemical formula	C_{8}H_{18}Si_{2}
Molar mass	170.402 g·mol^{−1}
Appearance	Colorless to white liquid
Density	0.791 g/cm^{3}
Melting point	26 °C (79 °F; 299 K)
Boiling point	134.6 ± 8.0 °C (274.3 ± 14.4 °F; 407.8 ± 8.0 K)
Solubility in water	0.031 g/L

Hazards
- Occupational safety and health (OHS/OSH)
Main hazards	Flammable, Irritant
- Except where otherwise noted, data are given for materials in their standard state (at 25 °C [77 °F], 100 kPa). verify (what is ?) Infobox references

Bis(trimethylsilyl)acetylene (BTMSA) is an organosilicon compound with the formula Me_{3}SiC≡CSiMe_{3} (Me = methyl). It is a crystalline solid that melts slightly above room temperature and is soluble in organic solvents. This compound is used as a surrogate for acetylene.

BTMSA is prepared by treating acetylene with butyllithium followed by addition of trimethylsilyl chloride (Me = CH_{3}, Bu = C_{4}H_{9}):

HC≡CH + 2 BuLi → LiC≡CLi + 2 BuH
LiC≡CLi + 2 Me_{3}SiCl → Me_{3}SiC≡CSiMe_{3} + 2 LiCl

An alternative source is the reaction of dimethyl acetylenedicarboxylate and 3,4-bis(trimethylsilyl)furan.

== Reactions ==
BTMSA is used as a nucleophile in Friedel-Crafts type acylations and alkylations and a precursor to lithium trimethylsilylacetylide. The TMS groups can be removed with tetra-n-butylammonium fluoride (TBAF) and replaced with protons. BTMSA is also a useful reagent in cycloaddition reactions. Illustrating its versatility, BTMSA was used in a concise total synthesis of (±)-estrone. A key step in this synthesis was the formation of the steroidal skeleton, catalyzed by CpCo(CO)_{2}.

BTMSA also serves as a ligand in organometallic chemistry. For example, it forms stable adducts with metallocenes.

Cp_{2}TiCl_{2} + Mg + Me_{3}SiC≡CSiMe_{3} → Cp_{2}Ti(η²-Me_{3}SiC₂SiMe_{3}) + MgCl_{2}
