= Ferrocenophanes =

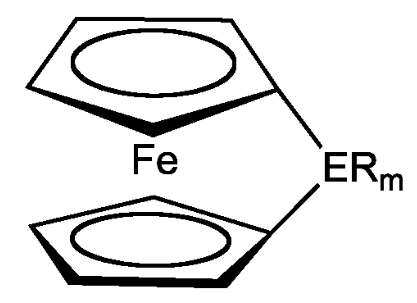
General structure of ferrocenophanes(ER_{m} e.g. C_{2}H_{4}, SnR_{2}, SiR_{2} or PPh).

Ferrocenophanes, also called ansa ferrocenes (from ansa: handle in greek), are organometallic compounds which are derived from ferrocene. They are a subset of ansa-metallocenes in which the metal is iron. In this compound class, the cyclopentadienyl ligands of the ferrocene are connected by one or more bridging groups. This hinders the rotation of the cyclopentadienyl ligands against one another and the reactivity of the complex with respect to the parent compound ferrocene is altered. A variety of organic and inorganic groups is suitable as bridging group.

== Nomenclature ==
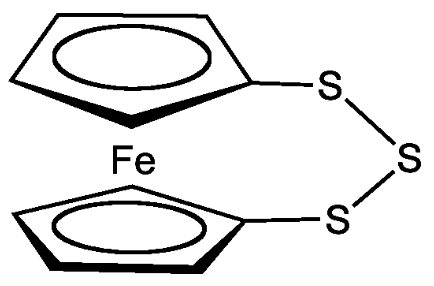
1,2,3-Trithio[3] ferrocenophane

For ferrocenophanes, the number of bridging atoms is indicated by a number in square brackets before its name. For example, [2] ferrocenophanes are ferrocenophanes with two bridging atoms. Ferrocenophane with a higher number of atoms in the bridge are given the corresponding number. In case of multiple bridges, the number of the respective bridging atoms is indicated analogously in several brackets, for example a ferrocenophane with two bridges each containing three atoms is referred to as [3] [3] ferrocenophane.

== History ==
The first molecules of this compound class were synthesized in the 1950s.

== Properties ==
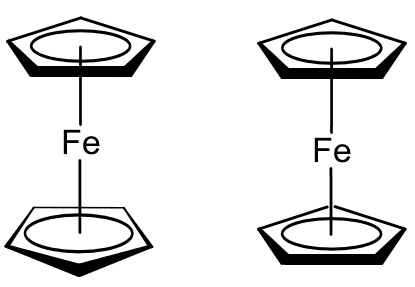
Conformations of ferrocene. Left: staggered; right: ecliptic.

An important parameter is the angle between the two cyclopentadienyl ligands. Often the reactivity increases with increasing angle. Carbon-bridged [1] ferrocenophanes do not exist because of the high ring strain. In heteroatom-bridged [1] ferrocenophanes, bonding angles between 18 and 27° are known. Depending on the bridging, the cyclopentadienyl ligands of the ferrocene parent can have a staggered or ecliptical conformation.

Depending on the type of bridging, the ferrocenophanes can have different symmetry elements, such as a twofold symmetry axis. There are ferrocenophanes which are optically active because of their configuration. Some of the optically active ferrocenophane derivatives are separable into their enantiomers (due to their rigid conformation), for example by chiral resolution.

== Preparation ==
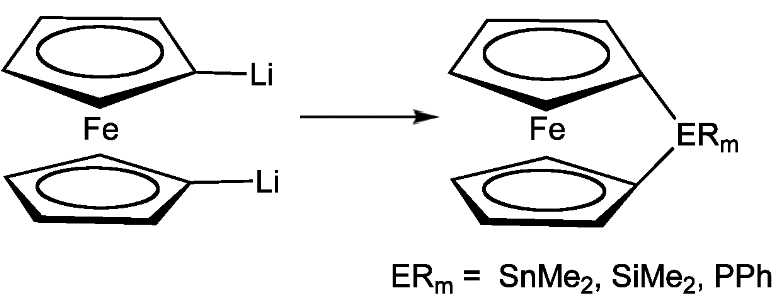
Preparation of ferrocenophanes via dilithium ferrocene.

An important starting compound for the production of ferrocenophanes is dilithioferrocene. This can be prepared simply via the reaction of ferrocene with n-butyllithium in the presence of tetramethylethylenediamine. By reaction of dilithium ferrocene with, for example, dimethyldichlorosilane, silicon-bridged ferrocenophanes can be prepared.

== Reactions ==
Ferrocenophanes undergo ring-opening polymerization to polyferrocenes.
