= 1,1'-Ferrocenedicarboxylic acid =

Names
- Preferred IUPAC name Ferrocene-1,1′-dicarboxylic acid

Identifiers
CAS Number	1293-87-4
3D model (JSmol)	Interactive image
ChemSpider	198591
ECHA InfoCard	100.013.699
EC Number	215-068-9
PubChem CID	16211180
CompTox Dashboard (EPA)	DTXSID40926371
- InChI: InChI=1S/2C6H5O2.Fe/c2*7-6(8)5-3-1-2-4-5;/h2*1-4H,(H,7,8); Key: ISVVAJYTLASNEJ-UHFFFAOYSA-N
- SMILES: [CH]1[CH][CH][C]([CH]1)C(=O)O.[CH]1[CH][CH][C]([CH]1)C(=O)O.[Fe]

Properties
Chemical formula	C_{12}H_{10}FeO_{4}
Molar mass	274.053 g·mol^{−1}
Appearance	yellow solid
Density	1.769 g/cm^{3}

Hazards
- GHS labelling
Pictograms	(GHS07: Exclamation mark)
Signal word	Warning
Hazard statements	H315, H319, H335

Related compounds
Related compounds	Ferrocenecarboxylic acid
- Except where otherwise noted, data are given for materials in their standard state (at 25 °C [77 °F], 100 kPa). Infobox references

1,1'-Ferrocenedicarboxylic acid is the organoiron compound with the formula Fe(C_{5}H_{4}CO_{2}H)_{2}. It is the simplest dicarboxylic acid derivative of ferrocene. It is a yellow solid that is soluble in aqueous base. The 1,1' part of its name refers to the location of the carboxylic acid groups on separate rings.

It can be prepared by hydrolysis of its diesters Fe(C_{5}H_{4}CO_{2}R)_{2} (R = Me, Et), which in turn are obtained by treatment of ferrous chloride with the sodium salt of the carboxyester of cyclopentadienide (C_{5}H_{4}CO_{2}R)^{−}. Ferrocenedicarboxylic acid is the precursor to many derivatives such as the diacid chloride, the diisocyanate, the diamide, and diamine, respectively, Fe(C_{5}H_{4}COCl)_{2}, Fe(C_{5}H_{4}NCO)_{2}, Fe(C_{5}H_{4}CONH_{2})_{2}, and Fe(C_{5}H_{4}NH_{2})_{2}.

Derivatives of ferrocenedicarboxylic acid are components of some redox switches and redox active coatings.

== Related compounds ==
- Ferrocenecarboxylic acid
