= Cyclopentadienyl magnesium bromide =

- Skeletal formula

Identifiers
CAS Number	17306-10-4
3D model (JSmol)	Interactive image
PubChem CID	87410419
- InChI: InChI=1S/C5H5.BrH.Mg/c1-2-4-5-3-1;;/h1-3H,4H2;1H;/q-1;;+2/p-1 Key: MFWGSTMYJJJWEV-UHFFFAOYSA-M
- SMILES: C1C=CC=[C-]1.[Mg+2].[Br-]

Properties
Chemical formula	C_{5}H_{5}BrMg
Molar mass	169.304 g·mol^{−1}
- Except where otherwise noted, data are given for materials in their standard state (at 25 °C [77 °F], 100 kPa). Infobox references

Cyclopentadienyl magnesium bromide is a chemical compound with the molecular formula C_{5}H_{5}MgBr. The molecule consists of a magnesium atom bonded to a bromine atom and a cyclopentadienyl group, a ring of five carbons each with one hydrogen atom.

The compound is a Grignard reagent, a type of organometallic compound that features a magnesium atom bonded to a halogen atom and to a carbon atom of some organic functional group.

This compound is of historic importance as the starting material for the first published synthesis of ferrocene by Peter Pauson and Thomas J. Kealy in 1951.

== Preparation ==
The compound can be prepared by reacting cyclopentadiene with magnesium and bromoethane in anhydrous benzene.
