= Ugi's amine =

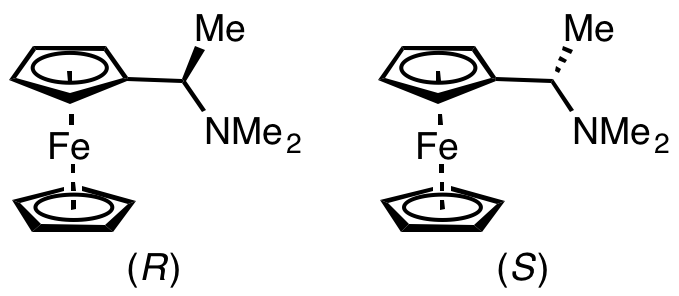
- (R)- and (S)-enantiomers of Ugi's amine

Names
- IUPAC name [1-(Dimethylamino)ethyl]ferrocene
- Other names N,N-Dimethyl-1-ferrocenylethylamine

Identifiers
CAS Number	31904-34-4 (R/S); 31886-58-5 (R); 31886-57-4 (S)
3D model (JSmol)	Interactive image
ChemSpider	58190569
PubChem CID	16212257 (R); 16212256 (S)
- InChI: InChI=1S/C9H14N.C5H5.Fe/c1-8(10(2)3)9-6-4-5-7-9;1-2-4-5-3-1;/h4-8H,1-3H3;1-5H;/q2*-1;+2 Key: UNMQCGHIBZALKM-UHFFFAOYSA-N
- SMILES: [CH-]1C=CC=C1C(C)N(C)C.[CH-]1C=CC=C1.[Fe+2]

Properties
Chemical formula	C_{14}H_{19}FeN
Molar mass	257.158 g·mol^{−1}
Appearance	orange-brown oil
Density	1.222 g/mL
- Except where otherwise noted, data are given for materials in their standard state (at 25 °C [77 °F], 100 kPa). Infobox references

Ugi’s amine is an organometallic compound with the formula (C_{5}H_{5})Fe(C_{5}H_{4}CH(CH_{3})N(CH_{3})_{2}. It is named for the chemist who first reported its synthesis in 1970, Ivar Ugi. It is a ferrocene derivative. Ugi’s amine is a precursor to ligands, most notably, the Josiphos ligands, which have been used in asymmetric catalysis

== History ==
In 1967, Schlӧg repurposed the term “planar chirality” for use in substituted ferrocene terminology, which is necessary for ferrocenes in which ferrocene's innate plane of symmetry is broken by introducing two different substituents to one of its ring. Nozaki, et al. demonstrated that a ferrocene derivative bearing a chiral amine substituent could participate in directed ortho lithiation of the same ring of the ferrocene, yielding products with planar chirality diastereoselectively. Nozaki’s ferrocene derivative provided products that were only 86% optically pure. Ugi, et al. improved the stereoselectivity by using [1-(dimethylamino)ethyl]-ferrocene, providing products that had an optical purity >95%. The utility of Ugi’s amine in forming ligands for asymmetric catalysis was first reported in 1974 by Kumada, et al.

== Synthesis ==
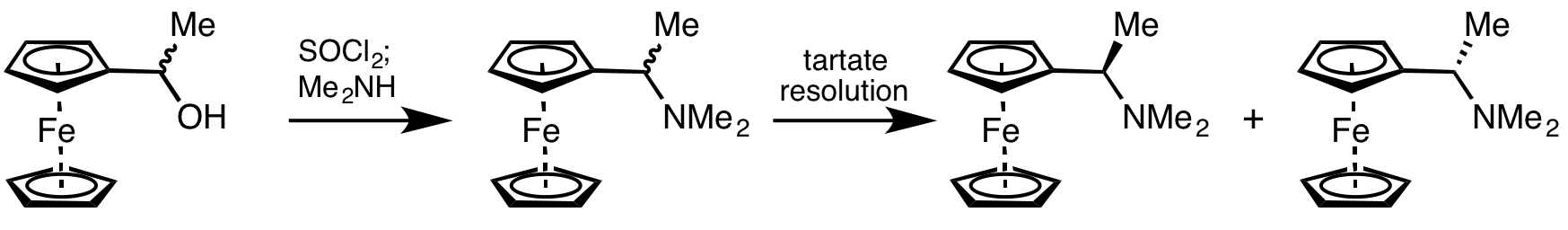
Synthesis of [1-(dimethylamino)ethyl]-ferrocene by Ugi.

The first synthesis of Ugi’s amine was reported in 1970 by Ugi, et al. It begins by converting (±)1-ferrocenylethanol to (±)1-ferrocenylchloroethane. This is then substituted in situ with dimethylamine, resulting in a racemic mixture of [1-(dimethylamino)ethyl]-Ferrocene. The racemic mixture is subsequently resolved via recrystallization of the tartrate salt, providing both enantiomers in their enantio-pure form.

Since the original report, other syntheses of Ugi’s amine have been reported. These are generally directed towards the synthesis of only one of the enantiomers rather than a racemic mixture. An enzymatic resolution of (±)1-ferrocenylethanol can be performed by Pseudomonas Fluorescens lipase-mediated acylation with vinyl acetate, providing unreacted (1S)-1-ferrocenylethanol (92% ee) and (1R)-[1-(acetyloxy)ethyl]-ferrocene (96% ee). The later can be easy hydrolyzed to (1R)-1-ferrocenylethanol. Either stereoisomer of can be converted to Ugi’s amine first by conversion to the acetate, then displacement with dimethylamine with complete stereoretention (see below for stereochemical outcome). Additionally, Knochel, et al. reported a stereoselective synthesis of Ugi’s amine using the same acetylation/displacement strategy, but accesses (1R)-1-ferrocenylethanol from a Corey-Bakshi-Shibata reduction of acetylferrocene.

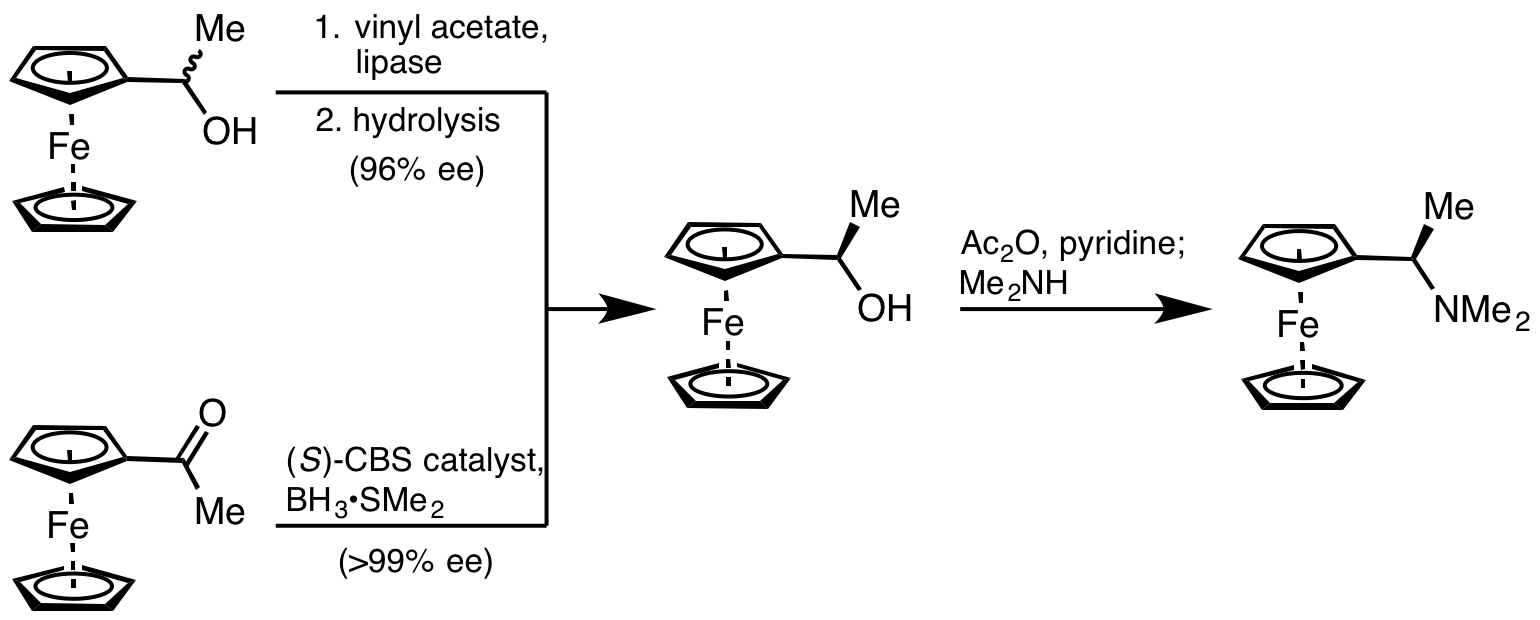
Enzymatic resolution and stereoselective reduction in route to enantiopure Ugi's Amine.

== Reactions ==
Ugi’s amine is capable of promoting directed ortho lithiation diastereoselectively (with respect to planar chirality). [(1S)-(dimethylamino)ethyl]-ferrocene treated with n-BuLi, then quenched with TMSCl produces a planar chirality of (R_{p}). Treatment of [(1R)-(dimethylamino)ethyl]-ferrocene under these conditions produces a planar chirality of (S_{p}). This selectivity is dictated by the orientation of the methyl substituent on the starting material in the conformation necessary for the nitrogen to be chelated to the lithiate. In one case this methyl substituent suffers from steric interactions with the other Cp ring, and in the other it points away from all other atoms. The high diastereoselectivity is independent of the electrophile used to trap the metalate, providing evidence for the stereoinductive step being lithiation and allowing broad synthetic utility of Ugi’s amine. If the (S,S_{p}) or (R,R_{p}) diastereomers are desired, the first metalate can be trapped with TMSCl to block the more favored lithiation position. Subsequent lithiation occurs at the only available, less favored site. Trapping with the desired electrophile and TBAF deprotection of the TMS group will provide the (S,S_{p}) or (R,R_{p}) diastereomer.

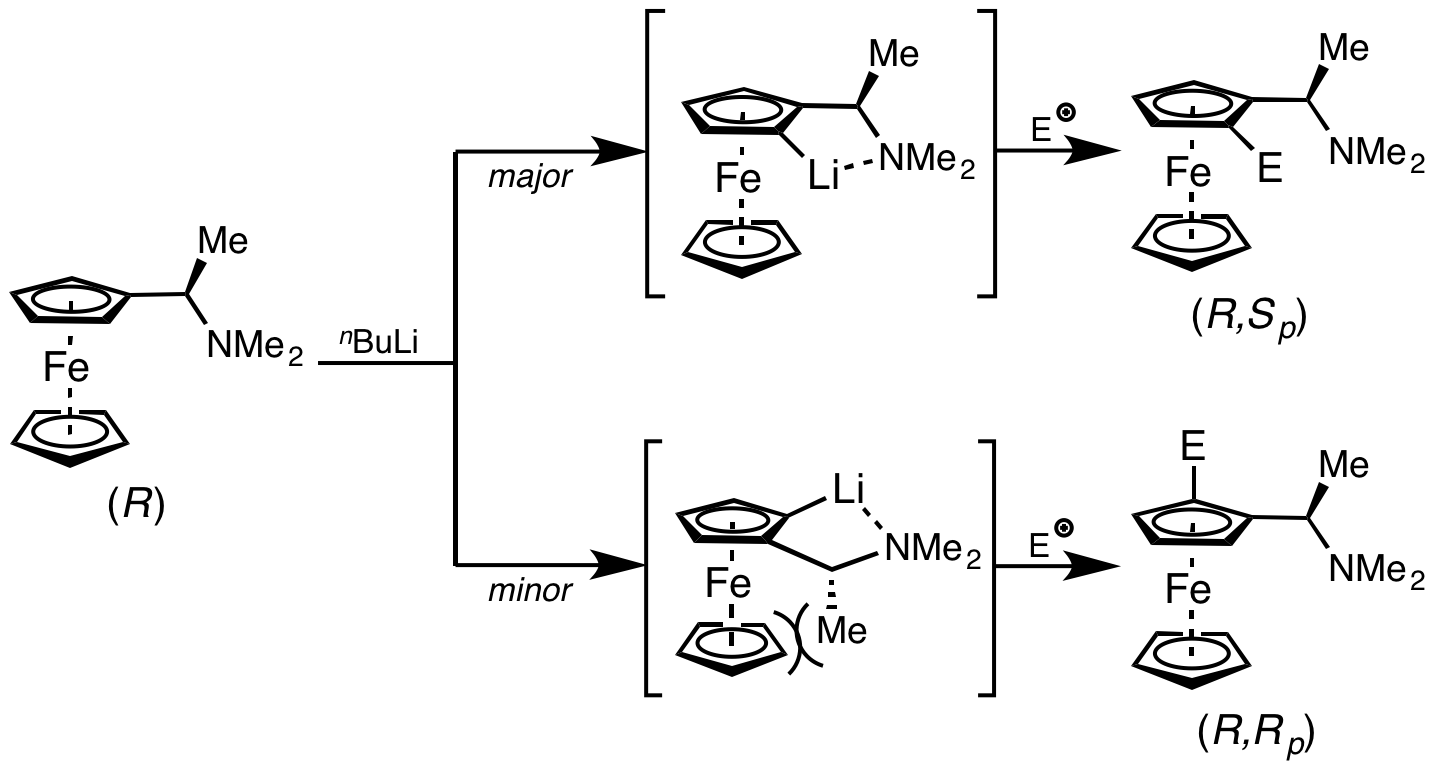
Rationale for the stereochemical outcome of directed lithiation of Ugi's Amine.

Further functionalization can take place at the carbon alpha to the ferrocene by substituting the dimethylamine with various nucleophiles. This is usually accomplished by quaternization of the amine with methyl iodide or acetic acid, which upon heating eliminates, resulting in a stable α-ferrocenylethyl cation intermediate. Addition of nucleophiles results substitution that is usually completely stereoretentive. Amines, carboxylates, alcohols, thiols, and phosphines are all competent nucleophiles. This is a common phenomenon for α-substituted ferrocenes.

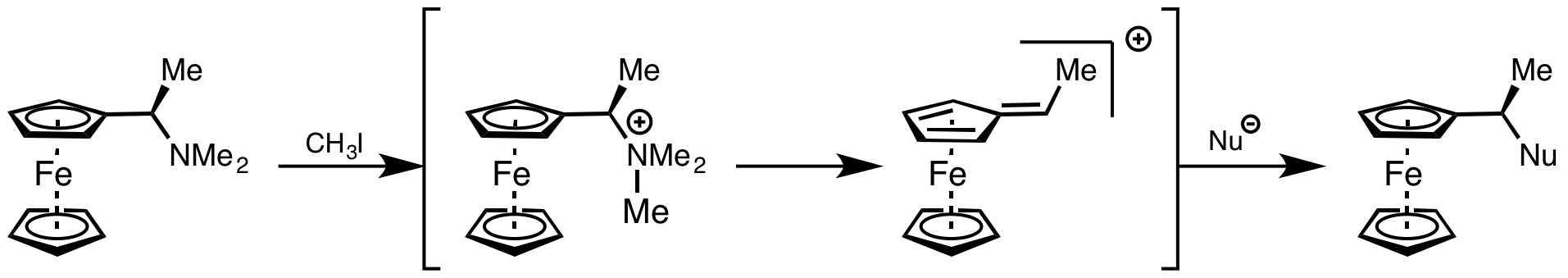
Substitution of Ugi's Amine with stereoretention.

== Ligands from Ugi's amine ==
Ugi’s amine has found extensive use in the synthesis of metal binding ligands used in homogeneous catalysis. As its ring-substituted derivatives generally contain a chiral center as well as planar chirality, it often produces high levels of enantioinduction in these reactions. These two forms of chirality, in some cases, are thought to work synergistically for enantioinduction. It is most commonly substituted with phosphorus to provide mono-, bi-, and tridentate phosphine ligands. The first report of such ligands was Kumada’s 1974 report of four mono- and bisphosphine ligands used for the rhodium-catalyzed asymmetric hydrosilation of ketones. The most notable set of ligands synthesized from Ugi’s amine is the Josiphos class of ligands, which has found use in numerous catalytic reaction types on both small and large scales. Below is a list of representative ligands derived from Ugi's amine:

- Josiphos
- Pigiphos
- TRAP
- Walphos
- BoPhoz
- Xyliphos
- BPPFOH
- Taniaphos

=== Asymmetric reactions utilizing ligands derived from Ugi's amine ===
Reaction Type	Metal Center(s)
Hydrosilation of ketones	Ru
Grignard Addition	Ni
Reduction of activated alkenes	Ru, Cu
Reduction of enamides	Ru
Reduction of ketones	Ru, Ir
Transfer hydrogenation of ketones	Re
Hydroalkynylation of allenes	Co
Allylic substitution	Pd
Coupling of ketoamides to aldehydes	Rh
Conjugate addition	Cu
Baylis-Hillman reaction	N/A (H-bonding)
[3+2] cycloaddition	Cu
Hydroboration	Cu
