= Iron arene complexes =

Molecular theory

A molecular electron-reservoir complex is one of a class of redox-active systems which can store and transfer electrons stoichiometrically or catalytically without decomposition. The concept of electron-reservoir complexes was introduced by the work of French chemist, Didier Astruc. From Astruc's discoveries, a whole family of thermally stable, neutral, 19-electron iron(I) organometallic complexes were isolated and characterized, and found to have applications in redox catalysis and electrocatalysis. The following page is a reflection of the prototypal electron-reservoir complexes discovered by Didier Astruc.

== Synthesis ==
The parent complex, C_{5}H_{5}FeC_{6}H_{6}, is observed to undergo decomplexation and dimerization, whereas analogues containing six alkyl groups on the benzene ring exhibit stability in many solvents and remain catalytically active (written as η^{5}-CpFe-η^{6}-arene).

=== Syntheses using ferrocene ===
In the process of ligand exchange, one of the cyclopentadienyl rings of ferrocene is replaced by an arene group. This has garnered significant interest as it provides a simple means to form complexes of arenes with the CpFe^{+} units. The reaction of ferrocene and an aryl alkyl group is carried out at 70–90 °C for 1–16 hours in the arene as the solvent (Figure 1). Aluminum chloride, AlCl_{3}, is a Lewis acid which prompts the reaction, and aluminum is added to inhibit oxidation of ferrocene to ferrocenium. Monoelectronic reduction of the Fe^{II} 18-electron monocation with Na/Hg in THF at ambient temperature yields the 19-electron complex as green-black crystals.

Figure 1. Synthesis of CpFe(arene) using ferrocene

Electron donating groups on the arene increase the yield. Additionally, alkyl groups which induce steric hindrance (e.g., Me, Et, etc.) will increase the yield.

=== Complexation of arenes to iron ===
A known type of complexation is the Fischer-Hafner synthesis, which treats transition metal chlorides with arenes in the presence of aluminum and aluminum chloride. The synthesis of bis(arene) iron dications is an example of this type, where a mixture of iron dichloride, FeCl_{2}, alkylbenzenes, and AlCl_{3} is refluxed in the arene as the solvent (Figure 2).

Figure 2. Synthesis of bis(arene) iron dications

Although AlCl_{3} is almost always used to induce ligand exchange reactions, other efficient Lewis acids are AlBr_{3}, GaCl_{3}, ZrCl_{4}, and HfCl_{4}.

== Structure and bonding ==
=== Cyclopentadienyl iron(arene) complexes ===
The electronic spectra of CpFe^{+}(arene) complexes have been compared to those of ferrocene and bis(arene) iron dications. Three spin allowed transitions are observed at 22,200, 26,200 and 31,900 cm^{–1} and two bands at 38,200 and 41,800 cm^{–1} are attributed to π→π* benzene transitions. The ligand field parameters (cm^{–1}) for the CpFe^{+} (arene) complexes are Δ_{1} = 8,500, Δ_{2} = 21,900, B = 320 (comparatively for ferrocene, Δ_{1} = 7,200, Δ_{2} = 22,000, B = 390). Therefore, the values of the electronic repulsion parameters B indicate large covalency between the metal–ligand bonds. In general, 19-electron complexes are thermally stable only when the arene ligand is peralkylated; steric bulk also stabilizes the complex.

The X-ray crystal structure for the CpFe(I)-C_{6}Me_{6} complex exhibits alternating sandwich positions in the crystal packing. Detailed EPR studies of the Fe(I) sandwiches in frozen solution, in the solid state, and in diamagnetic matrices show dynamic rhombic distortion, high degree of covalency, and spin-lattice relaxation.

=== Bis(arene) iron dications ===
Figure 3. Molecular orbital diagram bis(arene) transition metal sandwiches

Bis(arene) iron dications and their electronic configuration bear resemblance to their bis(arene) chromium counterparts. These compounds exhibit a doubly degenerate bonding e^{2} level that is high in metal character, while the nonbonding a_{1} orbital is nearly a pure d_{z}^{2} metal orbital (Figure 3).

When one electron is added to the dication, (C_{6}Me_{6})_{2}Fe^{2+}, a stable 19-electron complex is formed, a compound stabilized only when the arene is endowed with multiple methyl groups. Remarkably, a nearly stable complex arises when a second extra electron is added, with the case of C_{6}Me_{6} being particularly noteworthy (Figure 4). Although the effective atomic number (EAN) rule states that thermodynamically stable transition metal complexes contain 18 valence electrons, there are situations found in these organoiron systems where it can be breached, given that the anti-bonding doubly degenerate e_{1g} level harbors a high metal character and is located at relatively low energy. Three isostructural complexes (C_{6}Me_{6})_{2}Fe^{n+}, where n ranges from 0 to 2, have been isolated and their structures are shown in Figure 4.

Figure 4. Three isostructural complexes of (C_{6}Me_{6})_{2}Fe^{n+} (n = 0, 1, 2)

== Reactions and functionalizations of the coordinated arene ==
In 1979, Didier et al. reported the activation of the arene group in η^{5}-C_{5}H_{5}Fe-η^{6}-C_{6}(CH_{3})_{6} by dioxygen, O_{2}, through an electron transfer mechanism to form the superoxide radical anion, O_{2}^{–•}. In this paper, two unique reactions of O_{2} are reported: hydrogen atom abstraction by O_{2} from a methyl group on the arene ring (Figure 5), and the O_{2}-induced dimerization of C_{5}H_{5}Fe-arene when the arene group bears less than six methyl groups.

Figure 5. Hydrogen atom abstraction by O_{2} from a methyl group on the arene ligand and benzylic activation by CX_{2}

The green η^{5}-C_{5}H_{5}Fe-η^{6}-C_{6}(CH_{3})_{6} complex reacts readily when in contact with air (25°C) in pentane to afford complex 2 and water (Figure 5). Characterization by mass spectrometry, nuclear magnetic resonance, and X-ray crystallography revealed that the structure of 2 is best described as a cyclohexadienyl ligand coordinated in a pentahapto fashion to η^{5}-C_{5}H_{5}Fe and bearing an exocyclic double bond (Figure 5). Complex 2 has shown to be a good model for intermediates in benzylic activation processes when reacting with carbon dioxide, CO_{2}, and carbon disulfide, CS_{2} (Figure 5, right-side).

Dioxygen induces dimerization for complexes shown in Figure 6. The O_{2}-induced dimerization follows a radical mechanism, whereas H-atom abstraction in Figure 5 is mainly ionic.

Figure 6. O_{2}-induced dimerization

Other useful electron-transfer reactions of η^{5}-C_{5}H_{5}Fe-η^{6}-C_{6}(CH_{3})_{6} is the deprotonation of imidazolium salts, generating N-heterocyclic (NHC) carbenes. Arduengo demonstrated that deprotonating these salts produces NHCs that are isolable and relatively stable, provided that the heterocycle nitrogen atoms have appropriate substituents. Reacting a stoichiometric amount of CpFe-C_{6}(CH_{3})_{6} in THF in the presence of air with imidazolium salts, quickly results in the soluble carbenes, which are visible by the color change from deep-green to yellow (Figure 7). The carbenes generated in this form were characterized by 1H and 13C NMR.

Figure 7. Deprotonation of imidazolium salts to afford N-heterocyclic carbenes
