= 1,1'-Diaminoferrocene =

Names
- Preferred IUPAC name Ferrocene-1,1′-diamine

Identifiers
CAS Number	41636-79-7
3D model (JSmol)	Interactive image
ChemSpider	57269733
PubChem CID	15912376
- InChI: InChI=1S/2C5H6N.Fe/c2*6-5-3-1-2-4-5;/h2*1-4H,6H2;/q2*-1;+2 Key: VEDYBWCXQCEXEB-UHFFFAOYSA-N
- SMILES: C1=C[C-](C=C1)N.C1=C[C-](C=C1)N.[Fe+2]

Properties
Chemical formula	C_{10}H_{12}FeN_{2}
Molar mass	216.065 g·mol^{−1}
Appearance	yellow solid
Density	1.644 g/cm^{3}
Melting point	183–186 °C (361–367 °F; 456–459 K)
Boiling point	decomposition
- Except where otherwise noted, data are given for materials in their standard state (at 25 °C [77 °F], 100 kPa). Infobox references

1,1'-Diaminoferrocene is the organoiron compound with the formula Fe(C_{5}H_{4}NH_{2})_{2}. It is the simplest diamine derivative of ferrocene. It is a yellow, air-sensitive solid that is soluble in aqueous acid. The 1,1' part of its name refers to the location of the amine groups on separate rings. Compared to the parent ferrocene, the diamine is about 600 mV more reducing.

It can be prepared from the diisocyanate Fe(C_{5}H_{4}NCO)_{2}, which in turn is derived from 1,1'-ferrocenedicarboxylic acid. 1,1'-Diaminoferrocene was originally prepared by hydrogenation of 1,1'-diazidoferrocene ( Fe(C_{5}H_{4}N_{3})_{2}).

1,1'-Diaminoferrocene has been incorporated into various diamide and diimine ligands, which form catalysts that exhibit redox switching.
