= Ethylferrocene =

Names
- Preferred IUPAC name Ethylferrocene
- Other names Ethylferrocene

Identifiers
CAS Number	1273-89-8
3D model (JSmol)	Interactive image
ChemSpider	24767649
ECHA InfoCard	100.013.688
PubChem CID	16213263
CompTox Dashboard (EPA)	DTXSID60925841
- InChI: InChI=1S/C7H9.C5H5.Fe/c1-2-7-5-3-4-6-7;1-2-4-5-3-1;/h3-6H,2H2,1H3;1-5H; Key: XEYMPZDIHJESAH-UHFFFAOYSA-N
- SMILES: [Fe+2].[C-]1(CC)C=CC=C1.[CH-]1C=CC=C1

Properties
Chemical formula	C_{12}H_{14}Fe
Molar mass	214.089 g·mol^{−1}
Appearance	Dark brown oil
Density	1.256 g/mL
Melting point	81 to 86 °C (178 to 187 °F; 354 to 359 K)
Boiling point	264 °C (507 °F; 537 K)
- Except where otherwise noted, data are given for materials in their standard state (at 25 °C [77 °F], 100 kPa). verify (what is ?) Infobox references

Ethylferrocene is an organoiron compound with the formula Fe(C_{5}H_{5})C_{5}H_{4}C_{2}H_{5}). It is a derivative of ferrocene containing an ethyl group on one of the two cyclopentadienyl rings. Relative to the properties of ferrocene, its melting point is lower and its solubility of the compound in hydrocarbon solvents is improved.

== Use and preparation ==
It was once used as an additive in rocket propellant, to promote the burning rate. It can be synthesized by the Clemmensen reduction of acetylferrocene.
