= 1,1'-Ferrocenetrisulfide =

Names
- IUPAC name 1,2,3-Trithio[3]ferrocenophane
- Other names 1,1'-trithiaferrocenophane

Identifiers
CAS Number	32677-78-4
3D model (JSmol)	Interactive image
ChemSpider	10157180 (charge error)
PubChem CID	11984680 (charge error)
- InChI: InChI=1S/C10H8S3.Fe/c1-2-6-9(5-1)11-13-12-10-7-3-4-8-10;/h1-8H;/q-2;+2 Key: CGYCAYDFUFZJRS-UHFFFAOYSA-N
- SMILES: [CH-]1C=CC=C1SSS[C-]2C=CC=C2.[Fe+2]

Properties
Chemical formula	C_{10}H_{8}FeS_{3}
Molar mass	280.20 g·mol^{−1}
Appearance	Yellow solid
Density	1.887 g/cm^{3}
Melting point	149.5–150.5 °C (301.1–302.9 °F; 422.6–423.6 K)
- Except where otherwise noted, data are given for materials in their standard state (at 25 °C [77 °F], 100 kPa). Infobox references

1,1'-Ferrocenetrisulfide is the organoiron compound with the formula Fe(C_{5}H_{4}S)_{2}S. A yellow solid, it is the simplest polysulfide derivative of ferrocene. It can be synthesized by treatment of dilithioferrocene with elemental sulfur. Using proton NMR spectroscopy, the relatively slow conformational flexing of the trisulfide ring can be established.

Conformational equilibrium for ferrocene-1,1'-trisulfide.
