= Ferrocenecarboxaldehyde =

Names
- IUPAC name Ferrocenecarbaldehyde
- Other names FcCHO, Formylferrocene

Identifiers
| CAS Number | 12093-10-6 |
| 3D model (JSmol) | Interactive image; Interactive image |
| ChemSpider | 26585886 |
| ECHA InfoCard | 100.031.950 |
| PubChem CID | 15184314 |
- InChI: InChI=1S/C6H5O.C5H5.Fe/c7-5-6-3-1-2-4-6;1-2-4-5-3-1;/h1-5H;1-5H;/q2*-1;+2 Key: MQHZGUNMWQBVDK-UHFFFAOYSA-N; InChI=1S/C6H5O.C5H5.Fe/c7-5-6-3-1-2-4-6;1-2-4-5-3-1;/h1-5H;1-5H;/q2*-1;+2 Key: MQHZGUNMWQBVDK-UHFFFAOYSA-N
- SMILES: [CH-]1C=CC=C1.C1=C[C-](C=C1)C=O.[Fe+2]; C(=O)[C-]12[Fe+2]3456789([CH]1=[CH]3[CH]4=[CH]52)[CH-]%10[CH]6=[CH]7[CH]8=[CH]9%10

Properties
| Chemical formula | C_{11}H_{10}FeO |
| Molar mass | 214.045 g·mol^{−1} |
| Appearance | orange solid |
| Density | 1.566 g/cm^{3} |
| Melting point | 118–120 °C (244–248 °F; 391–393 K) |
- Except where otherwise noted, data are given for materials in their standard state (at 25 °C [77 °F], 100 kPa). Infobox references

Ferrocenecarboxaldehyde is the organoiron compound with the formula (C_{5}H_{5})Fe(C_{5}HCHO). The molecule consists of ferrocene substituted by an formyl group on one of the cyclopentadienyl rings. It is an orange, air-stable solid that is soluble in organic solvents.

== Synthesis ==
Ferrocenecarboxaldehyde is prepared by Vilsmeier-Haack reaction (formylation) using dimethylformamide and phosphorus oxychloride. Diformylation does not occur readily.

According to X-ray crystallography ferrocenecarboxaldehyde adopts the expected sandwich structure exhibited by other ferrocenes. The formyl group is coplanar with its attached ring.

In its IR spectrum, ferrocenecarboxaldehyde is characterized by a low frequency ν_{CO} band at 1670 cm^{−1} vs 1704 cm^{−1} for benzaldehyde.

== Reactions ==
Ferrocenecarboxaldehyde behaves like other aldehydes in terms of its reactivity, the main difference is that it is electroactive. Its basicity is indicated by the solubility of the compound in hydrochloric acid.

Ferrocenecarboxaldehyde, owing to the versatility of the formyl group, is a precursor to many ferrocene-modified compounds. With a Wittig reagent, it converts to vinylferrocene and related derivatives. With primary amines, ferrocenecarboxaldehyde condenses to give imines. The azomethine derivative undergoes 1,3-cycloaddition to C_{60}.

It can be reduced to the corresponding alcohol with hydride reducing agents. Asymmetric alkylation gives the chiral α-hydroxyethylferrocene. Dioxane derivatives, obtainable from 1,3-diols and the aldehyde, sustain ortho lithiation.

== Related compounds ==
- Ferrocenyl carboxylic acid
- Ferrocenemethanol
- Acetylferrocene
