= 1,1'-Ferrocenediisocyanate =

Names
- Preferred IUPAC name 1,1′-Diisocyanatoferrocene

Identifiers
CAS Number	12288-75-4
3D model (JSmol)	Interactive image
PubChem CID	15501612
- InChI: InChI=1S/2C6H4NO.Fe/c2*8-5-7-6-3-1-2-4-6;/h2*1-4H;/q2*-1;+2 Key: ARBUNVSYNOZTEE-UHFFFAOYSA-N
- SMILES: C1=C[C-](C=C1)N=C=O.C1=C[C-](C=C1)N=C=O.[Fe+2]

Properties
Chemical formula	C_{12}H_{8}FeN_{2}O_{2}
Molar mass	268.053 g·mol^{−1}
Appearance	Yellow-brown solid
Density	1.633 g/cm^{3}
- Except where otherwise noted, data are given for materials in their standard state (at 25 °C [77 °F], 100 kPa). Infobox references

1,1'-Ferrocenediisocyanate (1,1'-diisocyanatoferrocene) is the organoiron compound with the formula Fe(C_{5}H_{4}NCO)_{2}. It is the simplest diisocyanate derivative of ferrocene. It can be synthesized by the Curtius rearrangement of the diacyl azide, using several protocols starting from 1,1'-ferrocenedicarboxylic acid. The compound is useful as an intermediate in the synthesis of 1,1'-diaminoferrocene by hydrolysis of the isocyanates. Various poly(siloxane–urethane) crosslinked polymers can be formed by reaction with siloxane-diols. These compounds are of interest as electrochemically active polymers that might have good mechanical properties at low temperature.
