= Ferrocenecarboxylic acid =

Names
- IUPAC name Ferrocenecarboxylic acid
- Other names FcCO_{2}H, Ferrocenemonocarboxylic acid, Ferrocenic acid

Identifiers
CAS Number	1271-42-7
3D model (JSmol)	Interactive image
ChemSpider	26585892
ECHA InfoCard	100.013.673
PubChem CID	15764230
CompTox Dashboard (EPA)	DTXSID40925783
- InChI: InChI=1S/C6H5O2.C5H5.Fe/c7-6(8)5-3-1-2-4-5;1-2-4-5-3-1;/h1-4H,(H,7,8);1-5H;/q2*-1;+2 Key: BAJHDUZEIKRKAS-UHFFFAOYSA-N
- SMILES: [CH-]1C=CC=C1.C1=C[C-](C=C1)C(=O)O.[Fe+2]

Properties
Chemical formula	C_{11}H_{10}FeO_{2}
Molar mass	230.044 g·mol^{−1}
Appearance	yellow solid
Density	1.862 g/cm^{3}
Melting point	214–216 °C (417–421 °F; 487–489 K)
- Except where otherwise noted, data are given for materials in their standard state (at 25 °C [77 °F], 100 kPa). Infobox references

Ferrocenecarboxylic acid is the organoiron compound with the formula (C_{5}H_{5})Fe(C_{5}H_{4}CO_{2}H). It is the simplest carboxylic acid derivative of ferrocene. It can be prepared in two steps from ferrocene by acylation with a 2-chlorobenzoyl chloride followed by hydrolysis.

On a two-dimensional surface, most carboxylic acids form hydrogen-bonded dimers. Ferrocenecarboxylic acid instead forms a mixture of dimers and cyclic pentamers and organizes into a quasicrystalline order with fivefold symmetry, the first known molecular quasicrystal.

== Reactions and derivatives ==
The pK_{a} of ferrocenecarboxylic acid is 7.79±0.08. The acidity increases more than a thousand-fold, to 4.54±0.04 upon oxidation to the ferrocenium cation.

By treatment with thionyl chloride, the carboxylic acid anhydride ([(C_{5}H_{5})Fe(C_{5}H_{4}CO)]_{2}O) is produced.

Derivatives of ferrocenecarboxylic acid are components of some redox switches.

== Related compounds ==
- 1,1'-Ferrocenedicarboxylic acid
- Ferrocenecarboxaldehyde
