= Vinylferrocene =

Names
- IUPAC name Vinylferrocene
- Systematic IUPAC name Ethenylferrocene
- Other names Ferrocenylethene

Identifiers
CAS Number	1271-51-8
3D model (JSmol)	Interactive image
ChemSpider	24590072
PubChem CID	129738036
- InChI: InChI=1S/2C7H7.2C5H5.2Fe/c2*1-2-7-5-3-4-6-7;2*1-2-4-5-3-1;;/h2*2-6H,1H2;2*1-5H;;/q4*-1;2*+2 Key: VXSUCWUFYMRJEK-UHFFFAOYSA-N
- SMILES: C=C[C-]1C=CC=C1.C=C[C-]1C=CC=C1.[CH-]1C=CC=C1.[CH-]1C=CC=C1.[Fe+2].[Fe+2]

Properties
Chemical formula	C_{12}H_{12}Fe
Molar mass	212.073 g·mol^{−1}
Appearance	orange solid
Melting point	50–52 °C (122–126 °F; 323–325 K)
- Except where otherwise noted, data are given for materials in their standard state (at 25 °C [77 °F], 100 kPa). Infobox references

Vinylferrocene is the organometallic compound with the formula (C_{5}H_{5})Fe(C_{5}H_{4}CH=CH_{2}). It is a derivative of ferrocene, with a vinyl group attached to one cyclopentadienyl ligand. As the ferrocene analogue of styrene, it is the precursor to some polyferrocenes. It is an orange, air-stable oily solid that is soluble in nonpolar organic solvents.

Vinylferrocene can be prepared by the dehydration of α-hydroxylethylferrocene, which is obtained from acetylferrocene. It can also be made by a Wittig reaction of ferrocenecarboxaldehyde.
