= Ferrocenium hexafluorophosphate =

Names
- IUPAC name Ferrocenium hexafluorophosphate

Identifiers
CAS Number	11077-24-0
3D model (JSmol)	Interactive image
ChemSpider	17340319
ECHA InfoCard	100.157.410
PubChem CID	16212479
- InChI: InChI=1S/2C5H5.F6P.Fe/c2*1-2-4-5-3-1;1-7(2,3,4,5)6;/h2*1-5H;;/q;;-1; Key: PCJFEGIXYOQEQD-UHFFFAOYSA-N
- SMILES: [CH-]1C=CC=C1.[Fe+3].[CH-]1C=CC=C1.F[P-](F)(F)(F)(F)F

Properties
Chemical formula	C_{10}H_{10}F_{6}FeP
Molar mass	330.999 g·mol^{−1}
Appearance	dark blue powder
Density	1.808 g/cm^{3}
Melting point	(decomposes)
Solubility in acetonitrile	Soluble

Structure
Crystal structure	monoclinic
Space group	P2_{1}/c
Lattice constant	a = 13.429(3) Å, b = 9.547(2) Å, c = 9.547(2) Å α = 90°, β = 93.31(3)°, γ = 90°
Lattice volume (V)	1215.8(5) Å^{3}

Hazards
- GHS labelling
Pictograms	(GHS07: Exclamation mark)
Signal word	Warning
Hazard statements	H315, H319, H335
Precautionary statements	P261, P305+P351+P338
Safety data sheet (SDS)	External MSDS

Related compounds
Other anions	Ferrocenium tetrafluoroborate
Related compounds	Ferrocene
- Except where otherwise noted, data are given for materials in their standard state (at 25 °C [77 °F], 100 kPa). Infobox references

Ferrocenium hexafluorophosphate is an organometallic compound with the formula [Fe(C_{5}H_{5})_{2}]PF_{6}. This salt is composed of the cation [Fe(C_{5}H_{5})_{2}]^{+} and the hexafluorophosphate anion (PF^{−}_{6}). The related tetrafluoroborate is also a popular reagent with similar properties. The ferrocenium cation is often abbreviated Fc^{+} or Cp_{2}Fe^{+}. The salt is deep blue in color and paramagnetic.

Ferrocenium salts are one-electron oxidizing agents, and the reduced product, ferrocene, is relatively inert and readily separated from ionic products. The ferrocene–ferrocenium couple is often used as a reference in electrochemistry, though its standard potential is dependent on specific electrochemical conditions. In acetonitrile solution that is 0.1 M in NBu_{4}PF_{6}, the Fc^{+}/Fc couple is +0.40 V vs. the saturated calomel electrode, equivalent to +0.64 V with respect to the normal hydrogen electrode.

== Preparation and structure ==
Commercially available, this compound may be prepared by oxidizing ferrocene with ferric salts followed by addition of ammonium hexafluorophosphate.

The compound is monoclinic with well-separated cation and anion; the PF^{−}_{6} may rotate freely. The average Fe−C bond length is 2.047 Å, which is virtually indistinguishable from the Fe−C distance in ferrocene.
