= Ferroquine =

Chemical compound

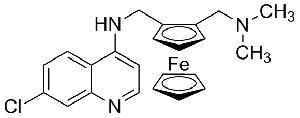

Identifiers
- IUPAC name: 7-chloro-N-({2-[(dimethylamino)methyl]ferrocenyl}methyl)quinolin-4-amine
- CAS Number: 185055-67-8
- PubChem CID: 140118553
- ChemSpider: 34537134
- UNII: 8D81JS19ET
- CompTox Dashboard (EPA): DTXSID00939922
- ECHA InfoCard: 100.208.008

Chemical and physical data
- Formula: C_{23}H_{24}ClFeN_{3}
- Molar mass: 433.76 g·mol^{−1}
- InChI: InChI=1S/C18H19ClN3.C5H5.Fe/c1-22(2)12-14-5-3-4-13(14)11-21-17-8-9-20-18-10-15(19)6-7-16(17)18;1-2-4-5-3-1;/h3-10H,11-12H2,1-2H3,(H,20,21);1-5H;/q2*-1;+2; Key:DDENDDKMBDTHAX-UHFFFAOYSA-N

Ferroquine is a synthetic compound related to chloroquine which acts as an antimalarial, and shows good activity against chloroquine-resistant strains. It contains an organometallic ferrocene ring which is unusual in pharmaceuticals, and while it was first reported in 1997, it has progressed slowly through clinical trials, with results from Phase II trials showing reasonable safety and efficacy, and further trials ongoing.
