= Diazaquinone =

A diazaquinone is a chemical compound that has an heterocyclic aromatic core including two consecutive doubly-bonded nitrogen atoms −N=N−, with the two =CH− carbon units adjacent to the nitrogens replaced by carbonyl (ketone) groups −(C=O)−. These carbon and nitrogen atoms then comprise a diacyl diimide unit, −(C=O)−N=N−(C=O)−.

Two canonical examples are 3,6-pyridazinedione (a quinone of pyridine), emerald-green; and 1,4-phthalazinedione (a quinone of phthalazine) a green crystalline solid (both soluble in acetone and stable at -77 °C).

The name was proposed by Thomas J. Kealy in 1962.
