= 1Fe-LSD =

Clinical data
- Other names: 1-(Ferrocenecarbonyl)-LSD; (8β)-1-Ferrocenecarbonyl-N,N-diethyl-6-methyl-9,10-didehydroergoline-8-carboxamide; SYN-L-234
- Routes of administration: Oral
- Drug class: Serotonergic psychedelic; Hallucinogen
- ATC code: None

Identifiers
- CAS Number: 3029080-72-3
- PubChem CID: 176002870

Chemical and physical data
- Formula: C_{31}H_{33}FeN_{3}O_{2}
- Molar mass: 535.469 g·mol^{−1}
- 3D model (JSmol): Interactive image
- SMILES: CCN(C([C@H]1CN(C)[C@]2([H])Cc3c4c(C2=C1)cccc4n(C(c5ccc[cH-]5)=O)c3)=O)CC.c6[cH-]ccc6.[Fe+2]
- InChI: InChI=1S/C26H28N3O2.C5H5.Fe/c1-4-28(5-2)25(30)19-13-21-20-11-8-12-22-24(20)18(14-23(21)27(3)15-19)16-29(22)26(31)17-9-6-7-10-17;1-2-4-5-3-1;/h6-13,16,19,23H,4-5,14-15H2,1-3H3;1-5H;/q2*-1;+2/t19-,23-;;/m1../s1; Key:IIOLYFVNUDARGZ-CHOFETAFSA-N

1Fe-LSD, also known as 1-(ferrocenecarbonyl)-LSD or as SYN-L-234, is a psychedelic drug of the lysergamide family related to lysergic acid diethylamide (LSD). It is thought to be a prodrug of LSD. The drug was patented by Lizard Labs in 2024. Subsequently, it was encountered online as a novel designer drug being sold in Germany in November 2025. 1Fe-LSD as the hemi-L-tartrate salt has been sold in the form of blotter containing 200 μg per tab and micropills containing 300 μg per pill. 1Fe-LSD is not an explicitly controlled substance in the United States or in Canada.

1Fe-LSD contains ferrocenyl, an iron substituent. Ferrocene is an orange organometallic compound and its attachment to the LSD molecule is assumed to result in the distinctive orange color of 1Fe-LSD blotter and pills.

== See also ==
- Substituted lysergamide
