= Didier Astruc =

French chemist

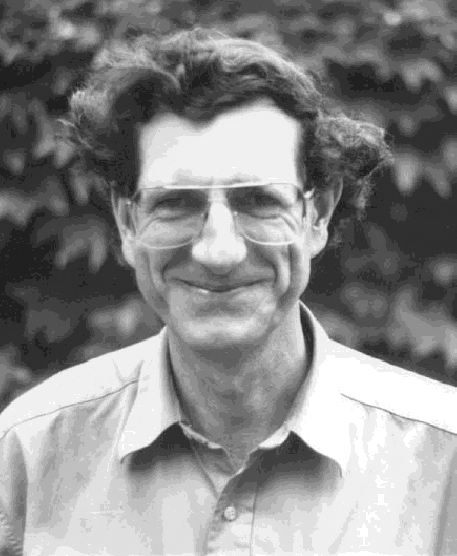
- Astruc in 2015
- Born: 9 June 1946 (age 80); Versailles, France
- Scientific career
- Fields: Chemistry, Dendrimers
- Workplaces: University Bordeaux
- Doctoral advisor: R. Dabard

Didier Astruc (born 9 June 1946 in Versailles) carried out his studies in chemistry in Rennes. After a Ph.D. with professor R. Dabard in organometallic chemistry, he did post-doctoral studies with professor R. R. Schrock (2005 Nobel Laureate) at the Massachusetts Institute of Technology Cambridge, Massachusetts, in the U.S. and later a sabbatical year with professor K. P. C. Vollhardt at the University of California at Berkeley. He became a CNRS Director of research in Rennes, then in 1983 full Professor of Chemistry at the University Bordeaux 1. He is known for his work on electron-reservoir complexes and dendritic molecular batteries, catalytic processes (olefin metathesis, C-C coupling, catalysis in water) using nanoreactors and molecular recognition using gold nanoparticles and metallodendrimers.

With his group, his recent and present research concerns green hydrogen production, CO_{2} utilization for C-C bond formation including toward organic synthesis and the use of ferrocene-containing macromolecules for molecular batteries and drug delivery.

He is the author of three books, scientific publications and the editor of five books or special issues. He has been a member of the National CNRS committee from 2000 to 2008 and the President of the Coordination Chemistry Division of the Société Française de Chimie from 2000 to 2004. Didier Astruc is on the Thompson-Reuters list of the top 100 chemists who have achieved the highest citation impact scores for their chemistry papers published between 2000 and 2010, and on the list of the Highest Cited Researchers 2015 and 2016 (Thomson-Reuters), and 2017 to 2023 (Clarivate Analytics).

== Distinctions ==
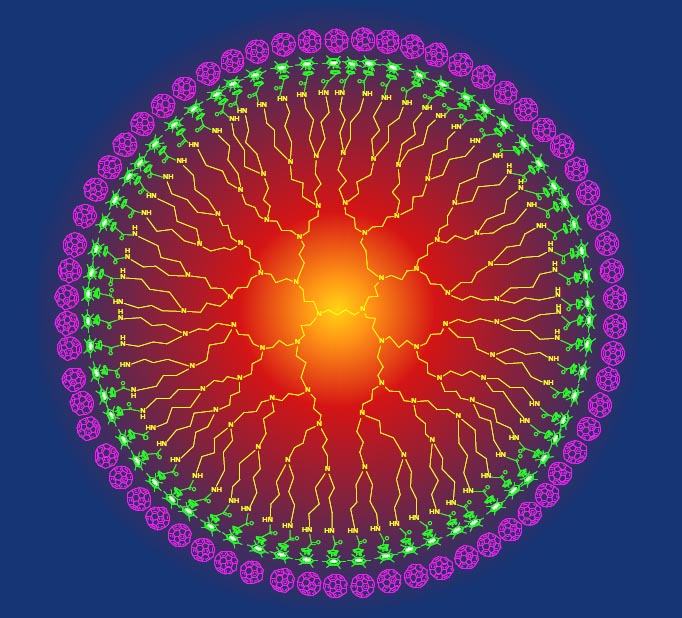
18-electron FeII metallodendrimer, exemplified by a G4-DAB-64-FeII complex with 64 equiv of Buckminsterfullerene C60•-.

- Award of the Chinese-French Chemical Societies (2023)
- Member of the French Academy of Science (2019)
- Fellow of the ChemPubSoc Europe (2018)
- Prize of the Teaching Division of the French Chemical Society (2016)
- Distinguished Member of the French Chemical Society (2015)
- Member of the National Committee for UNESCO (2012).
- Member of the European Academy of Sciences and Arts (2010).
- Recipient of the Gold Medal of the Italian Chemical Societies and joint Prize of the Italian and French Chemical Societies (2009).
- Karl Friedrich Gauss Professor of the University of Göttingen (2008).
- Member of the European Academy of Sciences (2007).
- Member of the Academia Europaea (2006).
- Member of the Leopoldina Academy, German Academy of Sciences (2006).
- Fellow of the Royal Society of Chemistry (2005).
- Grand Prix Achille Le Bel of the French Chemical Society (2001).
- Iberdrola Prize (1995).
- Senior Member of the Institut Universitaire de France (1995–2005).
- German-French Humboldt Award (Fondation Alexander von Humboldt) (1989).
- Prize of the Coordination Chemistry Division of the French Chemical Society (1981).
