= Josiphos ligands =

Family of chiral diphosphine ligands used for asymmetric catalysis

General scheme for a Josiphos ligand

A Josiphos ligand is a family of chiral diphosphine ligands that are used for asymmetric catalysis. They feature a 1,2-disubstituted ferrocene backbone.

== History ==
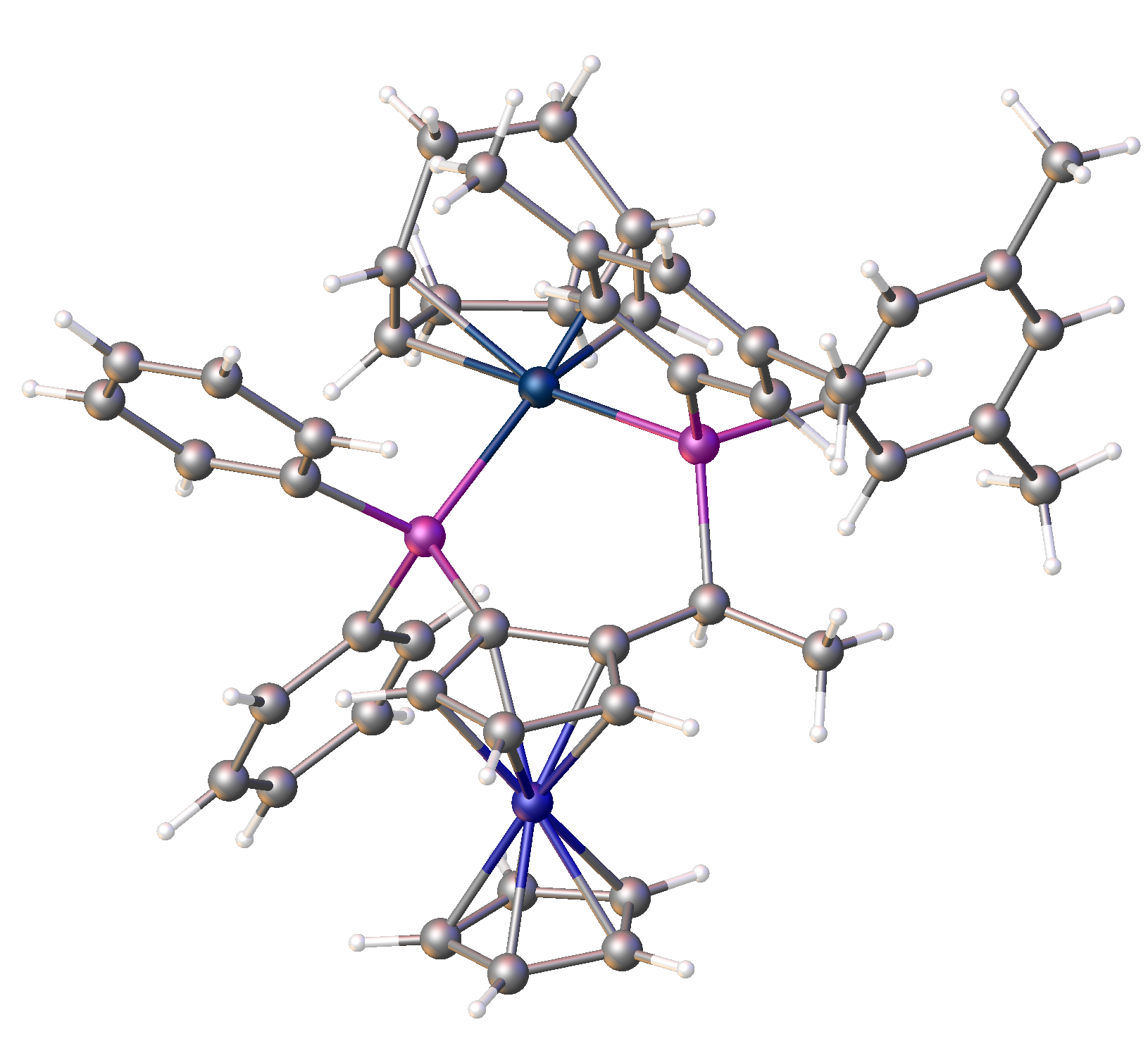
X-ray crystallographic structure of [(josiphos)Ir(cod)]^{+}. Color code: violet = P, blue = Fe, Ir.

Modern enantioselective synthesis typically applies a well-chosen homogeneous catalyst for key steps. The ligands on these catalysts confer chirality. The Josiphos family of privileged ligands provides especially high yields in enantioselective synthesis.

In the early 1990s, Antonio Togni began studying at the Ciba (now Novartis) Central Research Laboratories previously known ferrocenyl ligands for a Au(I)-catalyzed aldol reaction. Togni's team began considering diphosphine ligands, and technician Josi Puleo prepared the first ligands with secondary phosphines. The team applied Puleo's products in an Ru-catalyzed enamide hydrogenation synthesis; in a dramatic success, the reaction had e.e. >99% and a turnover frequency (TOF) 0.3 s^{−1}. The same ligand proved useful in production of (S)-metolachlor, active ingredient in the most common herbicide in the United States. Synthesis requires enantioselective hydrogenation of an imine; after introduction of the catalyst, the reaction proceeds with 100% conversion, turnover number (TON) >7mil, and turnover frequency >0.5 ms^{−1}. This process is the largest-scale application of enantioselective hydrogenation, producing over 10 kilotons/year of the desired product with 79% e.e.

Josiphos ligands also serve in non-enantioselective reactions: a Pd-catalyzed reaction of aryl chlorides and aryl vinyl tosylates with TON of 20,000 or higher, catalytic carbonylation, or Grignard and Negishi couplings A variety of Josiphos ligands are commercially available under licence from Solvias. The (R-S) and its enantiomer provide higher yields and enantioselectivities than the diastereomer (R,R).

The consensus for the naming is abbreviating the individual ligand as (R)-(S)-R_{2}PF-PR'_{2}. The substituent on the Cp is written in front of the F and the R on the chiral center after the F.

== Reactions using Josiphos ligands ==
Some reactions that are accomplished using M-Josiphos complexes as catalyst are listed below. Other reactions where Josiphos ligands can be used are: hydrogenation of C=N, C=C and C=O bonds, catalyzed allylic substitution, hydrocarboxylation, Michael addition, allylic alkylation, Heck-type reactions, oxabicycle ring-opening, and allylamine isomerization.

Hydroboration of styrene
Conducted at -78 °C, the above reaction has e.e.'s up to 92% and TOF of 5-10 h^{−1}. Hayashi's Rh-binap complex gives better yield.
Hydroformylation of Styrene
This reaction scheme yields of up to 78% ee of the (R) product, but low TON and TOF of 10-210 and 1-14h^{−1} (respectively).
Reductive amination
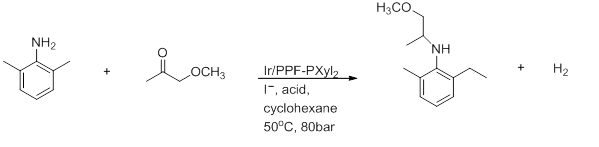
Above is the preparation of (S)-metolachlor. Good yields and a 100% conversion crucially require AcOH solvent.
Hydrogenation of exocyclic methyl imine
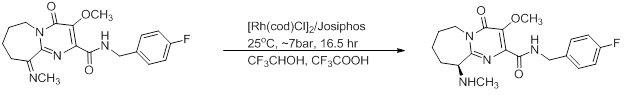
This key step to synthesize a HIV integrase inhibitor, Crixivan, is one of the few known homogeneous heteroarene hydrogenation reactions. Bulky R groups increase the catalyst's performance, with 97% e.e. and TON and TOF of 1k and 8 min^{−1}, respectively.
Asymmetric synthesis of chromanoylpyridine derivatives
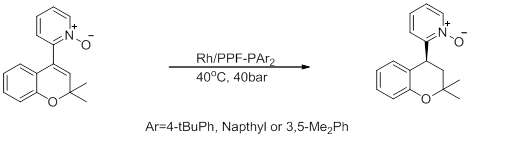
This reaction, for an intermediate in synthesis of an antihypertensive and anti-alopecic chromanoylpyridine derivative, exhibits high enantioselectivity, but low activity.

== Modified Josiphos ligands ==
The ferrocene scaffold has proved to be versatile.

Many variations of Josiphos ligands have been reported. One family is prepared from Ugi's amine.

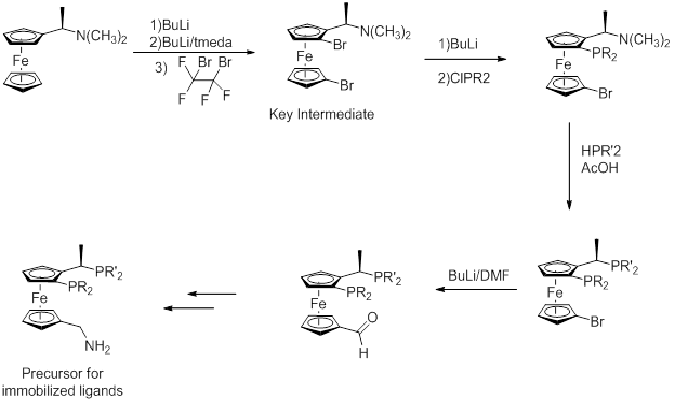

An important improvement on initial syntheses has been using N(CH_{3})_{2} as a leaving group over acetate, although an acetic acid solvent gives better yields.
