= N,N-Dimethylaminomethylferrocene =

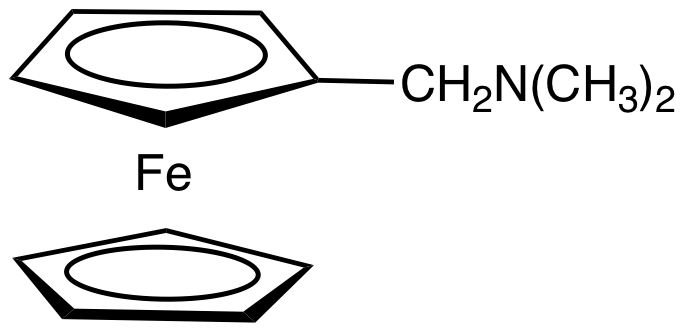

Names
- IUPAC name N,N-Dimethylaminomethylferrocene

Identifiers
CAS Number	1271-86-9
3D model (JSmol)	Interactive image
ChemSpider	92220
EC Number	215-044-8
PubChem CID	102082
- InChI: InChI=1S/C8H12N.C5H5.Fe/c1-9(2)7-8-5-3-4-6-8;1-2-4-5-3-1;/h3-6H,7H2,1-2H3;1-5H;/q2*-1;+2 Key: ISDNRMKSXGICTM-UHFFFAOYSA-N
- SMILES: CN(C)Cc1[cH-]ccc1.[cH-]1cccc1.[Fe+2]

Properties
Chemical formula	C_{13}H_{17}FeN
Molar mass	243.131 g·mol^{−1}
Appearance	orange oil
Melting point	5–8 °C (41–46 °F; 278–281 K)
- Except where otherwise noted, data are given for materials in their standard state (at 25 °C [77 °F], 100 kPa). Infobox references

N,N-Dimethylaminomethylferrocene is the dimethylaminomethyl derivative of ferrocene, (C_{5}H_{5})Fe(C_{5}H_{4}CH_{2}N(CH_{3})_{2}. It is an air-stable, dark-orange syrup that is soluble in common organic solvents. The compound is prepared by the reaction of ferrocene with formaldehyde and dimethylamine:

(C_{5}H_{5})_{2}Fe + CH_{2}O + HN(CH_{3})_{2} → (C_{5}H_{5})Fe(C_{5}H_{4}CH_{2}N(CH_{3})_{2} + H_{2}O

It is a precursor to prototypes of ferrocene-containing redox sensors and diverse ligands.

The amine can be quaternized, which provides access to many derivatives.
