= Acetylferrocene =

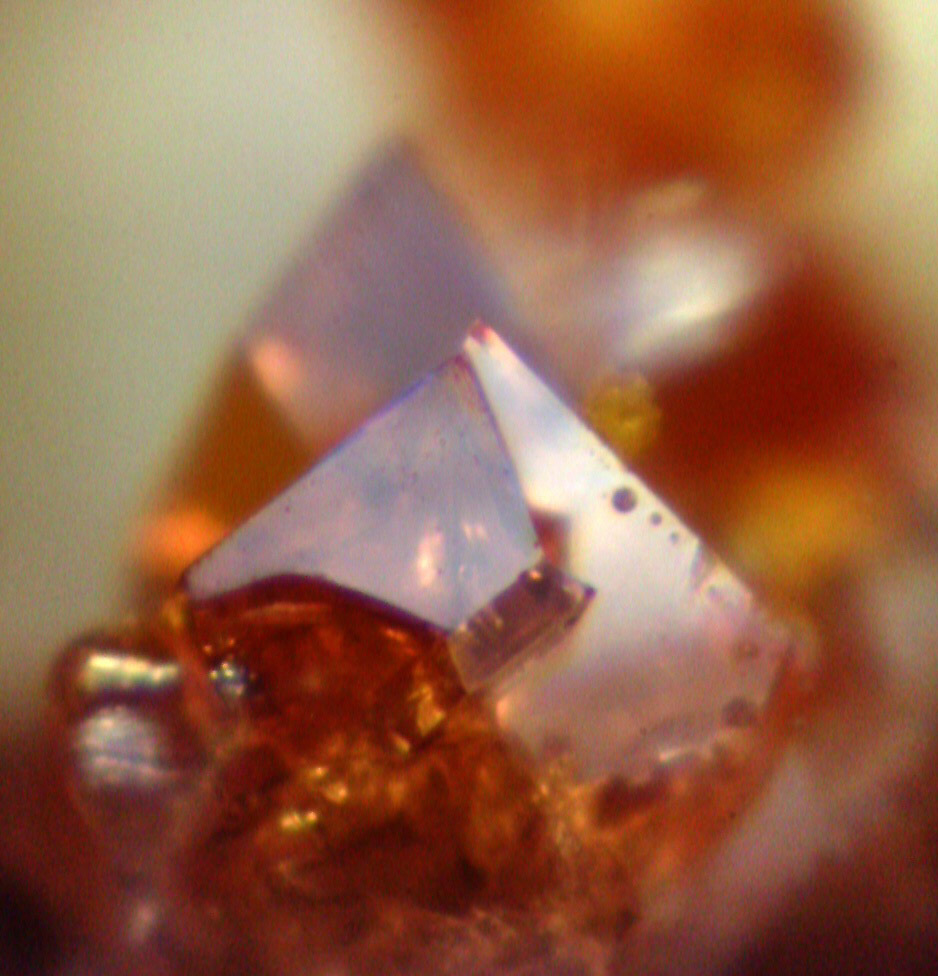

Names
- IUPAC name 1-Ferrocenylethan-1-one
- Other names Acetylferrocene

Identifiers
| CAS Number | 1271-55-2 |
| 3D model (JSmol) | Interactive image |
| ChemSpider | 21241939 |
| ECHA InfoCard | 100.013.676 |
| EC Number | 215-043-2 |
| PubChem CID | 10857189 |
| RTECS number | OB3700000 |
- InChI: InChI=1S/C7H7O.C5H5.Fe/c1-6(8)7-4-2-3-5-7;1-2-4-5-3-1;/h2-5H,1H3;1-5H; Key: PHMAOJNZIFULOG-UHFFFAOYSA-N
- SMILES: CC(=O)[C]1[CH][CH][CH][CH]1.[CH]1[CH][CH][CH][CH]1.[Fe]

Properties
| Chemical formula | [Fe(C_{5}H_{4}COCH_{3})(C_{5}H_{5})] |
| Molar mass | 228.07 g/mol |
| Appearance | Red brown crystal |
| Density | 1.014 g/mL |
| Melting point | 81 to 83 °C (178 to 181 °F; 354 to 356 K) |
| Boiling point | 161 to 163 °C (322 to 325 °F; 434 to 436 K) (4 mmHg) |
| Solubility in water | Insoluble in water, soluble in most organic solvents |

Hazards
- GHS labelling
| Pictograms | (GHS06: Toxic) |
| Signal word | Danger |
| Hazard statements | H300 |
| Precautionary statements | P264, P301+P310 |
| NFPA 704 (fire diamond) | 4 1 0 |
- Lethal dose or concentration (LD, LC)
| LD_{50} (median dose) | 25 mg kg^{−1} (oral, rat); 50 mg kg^{−1} (oral, mouse) |
- Except where otherwise noted, data are given for materials in their standard state (at 25 °C [77 °F], 100 kPa). verify (what is ?) Infobox references

Acetylferrocene is the organoiron compound with the formula (C_{5}H_{5})Fe(C_{5}H_{4}COCH_{3}). It consists of ferrocene substituted by an acetyl group on one of the cyclopentadienyl rings. It is an orange, air-stable solid that is soluble in organic solvents.

[[File:Hazard statement of ferrocene,acetylferrocene and bromocresol.jpg|thumb|The image provide the structure, hazard statement and solubility of ferrocene, acetylferrocene and bromocresol]]

== Preparation and reactions ==
Acetylferrocene is prepared by Friedel-Crafts acylation of ferrocene, usually with acetic anhydride (Ac_{2}O):

Fe(C_{5}H_{5})_{2} + Ac_{2}O → (C_{5}H_{5})Fe(C_{5}H_{4}Ac) + HOAc

The experiment is often conducted in the instructional laboratory to illustrate acylation as well as chromatographic separations.

Acetylferrocene can be converted to many derivatives, e.g., reduction to the chiral alcohol (C_{5}H_{5})Fe(C_{5}H_{4}CH(OH)Me) and precursor to vinylferrocene. The oxidized derivative, acetylferrocenium, is used as a 1e-oxidant in the research laboratory.
