= Ferrocenium tetrafluoroborate =

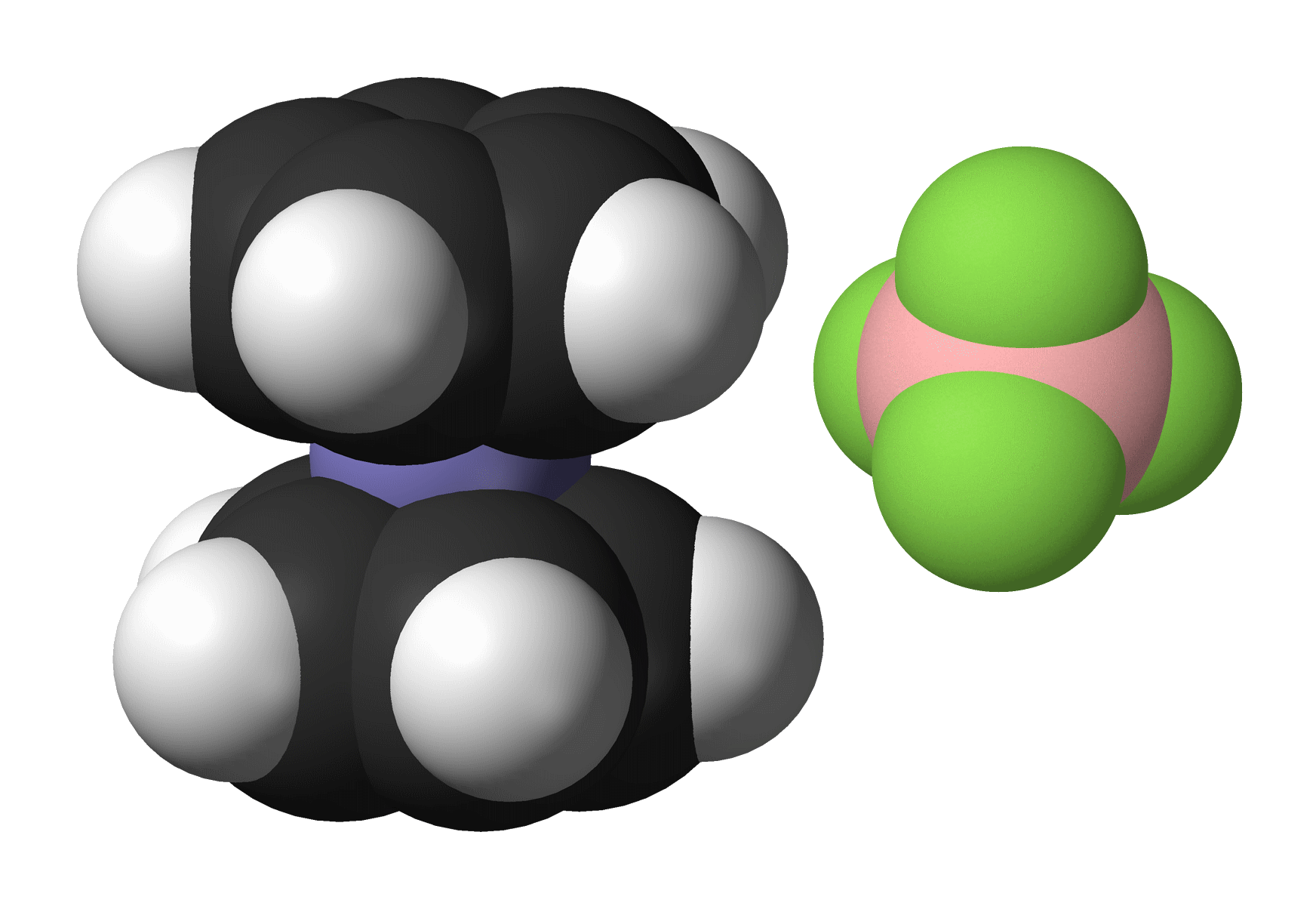

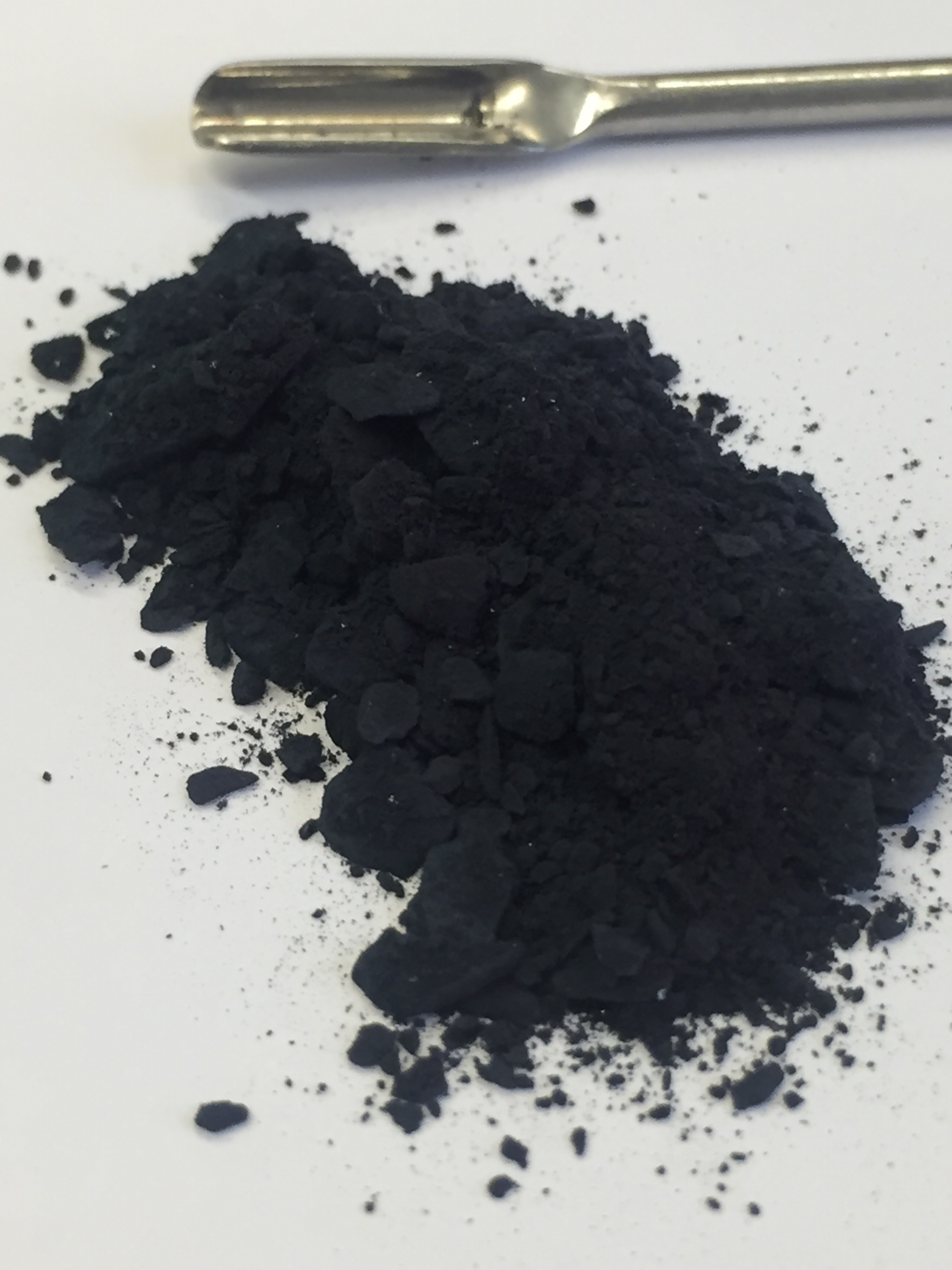

Names
- IUPAC name Ferrocenium tetrafluoroborate
- Other names FcBF_{4}

Identifiers
CAS Number	1282-37-7
3D model (JSmol)	Interactive image
ChemSpider	69007671
ECHA InfoCard	100.156.161
EC Number	627-836-4
PubChem CID	124204127 charge error
CompTox Dashboard (EPA)	DTXSID90746541
- InChI: InChI=1S/2C5H5.BF4.Fe/c2*1-2-4-5-3-1;2-1(3,4)5;/h2*1-5H;;/q3*-1;+3 Key: HOUMJOPJFCQTEL-UHFFFAOYSA-N
- SMILES: C1=C[CH-]C=C1.[Fe+3].C2=C[CH-]C=C2.F[B-](F)(F)F

Properties
Chemical formula	C_{10}H_{10}BFeF_{4}
Molar mass	272.84 g/mol
Appearance	dark blue powder
Melting point	178 °C (352 °F; 451 K) (decomposes)
Solubility in acetonitrile	Soluble

Hazards
- GHS labelling
Pictograms	(GHS05: Corrosive)
Signal word	Danger
Hazard statements	H314
Precautionary statements	P280, P305+P351+P338, P310
Safety data sheet (SDS)	External MSDS

Related compounds
Related compounds	Ferrocene
- Except where otherwise noted, data are given for materials in their standard state (at 25 °C [77 °F], 100 kPa). verify (what is ?) Infobox references

Ferrocenium tetrafluoroborate is an organometallic compound with the formula [Fe(C_{5}H_{5})_{2}]BF_{4}. This salt is composed of the cation [Fe(C_{5}H_{5})_{2}]^{+} and the tetrafluoroborate anion (BF^{−}_{4}). The related hexafluorophosphate is also a popular reagent with similar properties. The ferrocenium cation is often abbreviated Fc^{+} or Cp_{2}Fe^{+}. The salt is deep blue in color and paramagnetic.

Ferrocenium salts are one-electron oxidizing agents, and the reduced product, ferrocene, is inert and often readily separated from ionic products. The ferrocene–ferrocenium couple is used as a reference in electrochemistry, though its standard potential is dependent on specific electrochemical conditions.

== Preparation ==
Commercially available, this compound may be prepared by oxidizing ferrocene typically with ferric salts followed by addition of fluoroboric acid. A variety of other oxidants work well also, such as nitrosyl tetrafluoroborate. Many analogous ferrocenium salts are known.

== Structure ==
According to X-ray crystallography, the structures of the metallocene component of FcBF_{4} and the parent ferrocene are very similar. The Fe−C distances in the cation are 209.5 pm, about 2% longer than the Fe−C distances in ferrocene.
