= Peter Pauson =

German–Jewish chemist who settled in Britain (1925–2013)

Peter Ludwig Israel Pauson FRSE FRIC (1925–2013) was a German–Jewish emigrant who settled in Britain and who is remembered for his contributions to chemistry, most notably the Pauson–Khand reaction and as joint discoverer of ferrocene.

== Life ==
He was born in Bamberg, Germany on 30 July 1925, the son of Stefan Pauson and his wife, Helene Dorothea Herzfelder. His parents escaped to England in 1939 with Peter and his two sisters to flee the Nazi persecution of Jews.

In 1942 the family moved to Glasgow and he began studying chemistry in the University of Glasgow under Thomas Stevens Stevens. After graduating in 1946, he moved to Sheffield University as a postgraduate, studying under Robert Downs Haworth and receiving his doctorate in 1949. He then went to Duquesne University in Pittsburgh, Pennsylvania and pursued research on tropolones and other aromatic non-benzenoid molecules. His discovery of ferrocene with his student, Thomas J. Kealy, arose from an attempt to dimerize cyclopentadienylmagnesium bromide using Iron(III) chloride; the orange-yellow solid with formula C_{10}H_{10}Fe was described as a "molecular sandwich" in Pauson's note which was published in Nature in 1951.

From 1951 to 1952 he studied at the University of Chicago under Morris Kharasch, then becoming a DuPont Fellow at Harvard University. He then gained practical experience at the DuPont Laboratories in Wilmington. Returning to Britain, he became a lecturer at Sheffield University and in 1959 became Professor of Organic Chemistry at Strathclyde University. In 1964 he was elected a Fellow of the Royal Society of Edinburgh.

Pauson and his postdoctoral assistant, Ihsan Khand, discovered the reaction now renowned as the Pauson–Khand reaction in 1971, though Pauson always referred to it as the "Khand reaction".

In 1994, the University of Strathclyde established the Merck Pauson Chair in Preparative Chemistry, funded by Merck, marking the contribution of Pauson to chemistry and to the university.

Pauson retired in 1995 and died peacefully at home on 10 December 2013. He was cremated at Clydebank Crematorium. In his obituary, he is described as "a gentleman of modesty, humility, and compassion … a fine man and a marvellous scientist".

== Family ==
He married Lai-Ngau Mary (née Wong) (1928 – March 18, 2010), having met her at a party hosted by Enrico Fermi when Pauson was at the University of Chicago in the early 1950s. They went on to have two children, Hilary and Alfred.

== Selected publications ==
- Organometallic Chemistry (1967)
- Kealy, TJ; Pauson, PL (1951). "Bis-cyclopentadienyl iron: a molecular sandwich". Nature. 168 (4285): 1039–1042. doi:10.1038/1681039b0. S2CID 4181383.
- US 2,680,756, Pauson, Peter L, "Dicyclopentadienyliron and process of making the same", issued 8 June 1954, assigned to E I du Pont de Nemours and Co
- Pauson, Peter L (1955). "Tropones and tropolones". Chemical Reviews. 55 (1): 9–136. doi:10.1021/cr50001a002.
- Pauson, Peter L; Segal, John A (1975). "Formation of substituted cyclohexadienyl tricarbonylmanganese complexes by nucleophilic addition reactions of functionally substituted ($\eta$-arene) tricarbonylmanganese cations". Journal of the Chemical Society, Dalton Transactions (16–17): 1683–1686. doi:10.1039/dt9750001683.
- Pauson, Peter L (1977). "Aromatic transition metal complexes – the first 25 years". Pure and Applied Chemistry. 49 (6): 839–855. doi:10.1351/pac197749060839. S2CID 98522726.
- Pauson, Peter L (1980). "Nucleophilic addition to transition metal complexes". Journal of Organometallic Chemistry. 200 (1): 207–221. doi:10.1016/S0022-328X(00)88647-7.
- Pauson, Peter L (1985). "The khand reaction: a convenient and general route to a wide range of cyclopentenone derivatives". Tetrahedron. 41 (24): 5855–5860. doi:10.1016/S0040-4020(01)91424-3.
