= 1,1'-Dilithioferrocene =

Names
- IUPAC name 1,1'-Dilithioferrocene

Identifiers
CAS Number	33272-09-2
3D model (JSmol)	Interactive image
ChemSpider	9238543
PubChem CID	11063390
- InChI: InChI=1S/2C5H4.Fe.2Li/c2*1-2-4-5-3-1;;;/h2*1-4H;;;/q2*-1;;2*+1 Key: CWUATGTYNYDRDF-UHFFFAOYSA-N
- SMILES: [Li+].[Li+].[CH]1[CH][CH][C-][CH]1.[CH]1[CH][CH][C-][CH]1.[Fe]

Properties
Chemical formula	C_{10}H_{8}FeLi_{2}
Molar mass	197.90 g·mol^{−1}
Appearance	orange solid

Hazards
- Occupational safety and health (OHS/OSH)
Main hazards	pyrophoric
- Except where otherwise noted, data are given for materials in their standard state (at 25 °C [77 °F], 100 kPa). Infobox references

1,1'-Dilithioferrocene is the organoiron compound with the formula Fe(C_{5}H_{4}Li)_{2}. It is exclusively generated and isolated as a solvate, using either ether or tertiary amine ligands bound to the lithium centers. Regardless of the solvate, dilithioferrocene is used commonly to prepare derivatives of ferrocene.

== Synthesis and reactions ==
Treatment of ferrocene with butyl lithium gives 1,1'-dilithioferrocene, regardless of the stoichiometry (monolithioferrocene requires special conditions for its preparation). Typically the lithiation reaction is conducted in the presence of tetramethylethylenediamine (tmeda). The adduct [Fe(C_{5}H_{4}Li)_{2}]_{3}(tmeda)_{2} has been crystallized from such solutions. Recrystallization of this adduct from thf gives [Fe(C_{5}H_{4}Li)_{2}]_{3}(thf)_{6}.

1,1'-Dilithioferrocene reacts with a variety of electrophiles to afford disubstituted derivatives of ferrocene. These electrophiles include S_{8} (to give 1,1'-ferrocenetrisulfide), chlorophosphines, and chlorosilanes.

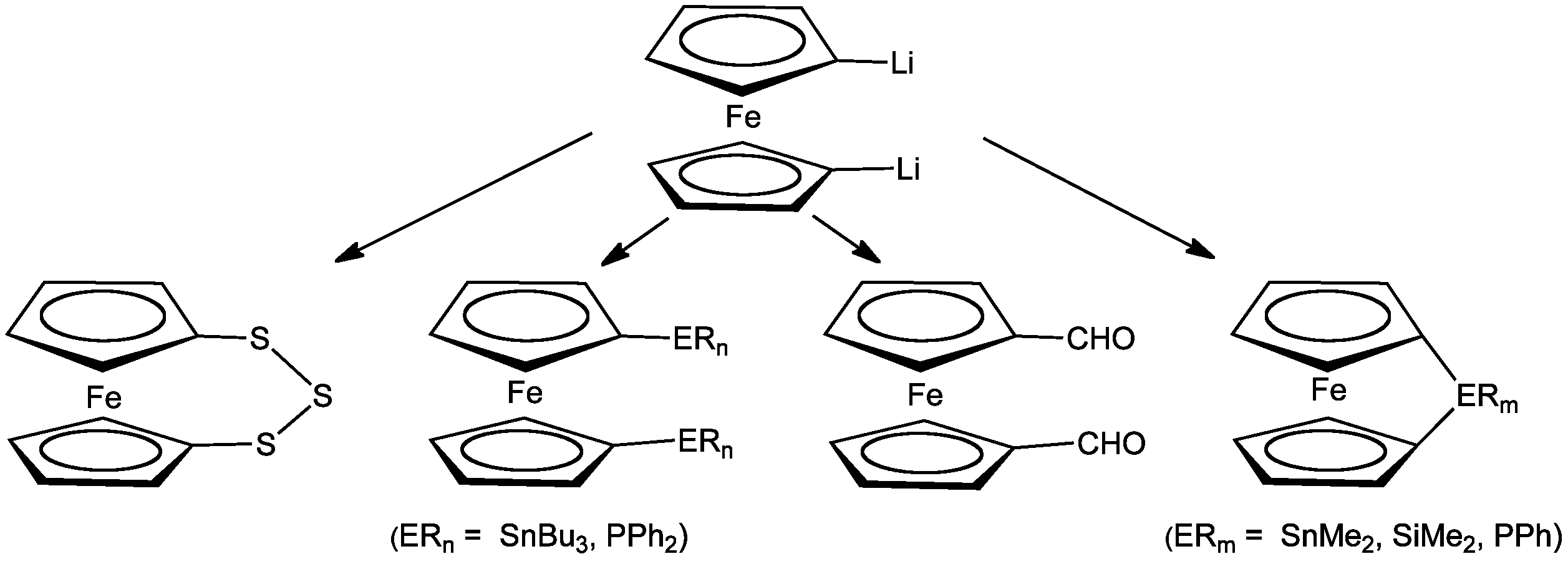
Some transformations of dilithioferrocene.

The diphosphine ligand 1,1'-bis(diphenylphosphino)ferrocene (dppf) is prepared by treating dilithioferrocene with chlorodiphenylphosphine.

== Monolithioferrocene ==
The reaction of ferrocene with one equivalent of butyllithium mainly affords dilithioferrocene. Monolithioferrocene can be obtained using tert-butyllithium.
