= Redox switch =

In chemistry, a redox switch is a molecular device that consists of two subunits: a functional component and a control component. The "control" subunit is redox-active, meaning that it can exist in either of two redox states. The "functional" subunit could have a variety of readouts, such as fluorescence, the binding of a substrate, or catalytic activity. The key feature of such redox switches is that the functional subunit is influenced by the control subunit. One example of a redox switch consists of an anthracene substituent to a copper-thiacrown ether (14-ane-4) coordination complex. When in the cupric oxidation state, the anthracene does not fluoresce. When in the cuprous state, the assembly is highly fluorescent. Several redox switches have been produced from ferrocenecarboxylic acid, which can be conjugated to a number of functional components. 1,1'-Diaminoferrocene has been incorporated into various diamide and diimine ligands, which form catalysts that exhibit redox switching.
