= Thomas J. Kealy =

American chemist

Thomas Joseph Kealy (December 22, 1927 – May 17, 2012) was an American chemist.

== Personal ==
He was born in 1927 to Thomas S. Kealy (from Ireland) and Josephine Kealy (born Frawley), in New York. He had three siblings, including John F. and Josephine Joan (married Clarke). Thomas married Patricia Weaver in 1953.

== Education and career ==
Thomas graduated in 1950 from the Manhattan College, New York.

In 1951, while a student at Duquesne University, he and his advisor Peter Pauson discovered the compound ferrocene by accident, while trying to prepare fulvalene. Their discovery revolutionized chemistry and created organometallic chemistry as a separate discipline.

Between 1957 and 1967, at least, he was working as a research chemist for DuPont in Delaware. His published research includes the addition reaction of phenols with ethylene, the chemistry of allene (propadiene, H_{2}C=C=CH_{2}), the synthesis of diazaquinones, the co-dimerization of monoalkenes and conjugated dienes. He also filed a patent on synthesis of biciclooctenones in 1957, one on diazaquinones in 1960, and one on extrudable alkene copolymers in 1968.
