= Benzylic activation in tricarbonyl(arene)chromium complexes =

Benzylic activation in tricarbonyl(arene)chromium complexes refers to the reactions at the benzylic position of aromatic rings complexed to chromium(0). Complexation of an aromatic ring to chromium stabilizes both anions and cations at the benzylic position and provides a steric blocking element for diastereoselective functionalization of the benzylic position. A large number of stereoselective methods for benzylic and homobenzylic functionalization have been developed based on this property.

== Tricarbonyl(arene)chromium complexes ==
Tricarbonyl(arene)chromium complexes of the type (arene)Cr(CO)_{3} are readily prepared by heating a solution of chromium hexacarbonyl with arenes, especially electron rich derivatives. The chromium(0) activates the side chain of the arene, facilitating dissociation of a benzylic proton, leaving group, or nucleophilic addition to the homobenzylic position of styrenes. Further transformations of the resulting conformationally restricted, benzylic anion or cation involve the approach of reagents exo to the chromium fragment. Thus, benzylic functionalization reactions of planar chiral chromium arene complexes are highly diastereoselective. Additionally, the chromium tri(carbonyl) fragment can be used as a blocking element in addition reactions to ortho-substituted aromatic aldehydes and alkenes. An ortho substituent is necessary in these reactions to restrict conformations available to the aldehyde or alkene. Removal of the chromium fragment to afford the metal-free functionalized aromatic compound is possible photolytically or with an oxidant.

== Planar chiral chromium complexes ==
Enantiopure, planar chiral chromium arene complexes can be synthesized using several strategies. Diastereoselective complexation of a chiral, non-racemic arene to chromium is one such strategy. In the followingexample, enantioselective Corey-Itsuno reduction sets up a diastereoselective ligand substitution reaction. After complexation, the alcohol is reduced with triethylsilane.

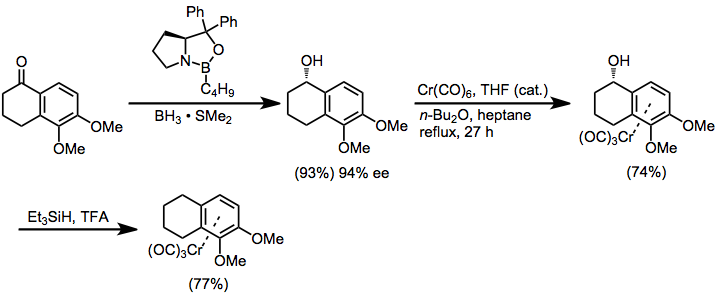

A second strategy involves enantioselective ortho-lithiation and in situ quenching with an electrophile. Isolation of the lithium arene and subsequent treatment with TMSCl led to lower enantioselectivities.

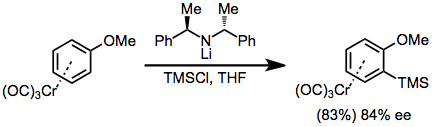

Site-selective conjugate addition to chiral aryl hydrazone complexes can also be used for the enantioselective formation of planar chiral chromium arenes. Hydride abstraction neutralizes the addition product, and treatment with acid cleaves the hydrazone.

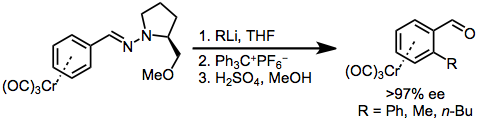

== Benzylic functionalization reactions ==
ortho-Substituted aryl aldehyde complexes undergo diastereoselective nucleophilic addition with organometallic reagents and other nucleophiles. The following equation illustrates a diastereoselective Morita-Baylis-Hillman reaction

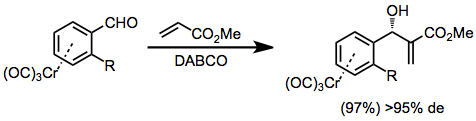

Pinacol coupling and the corresponding diamine coupling are possible in the presence of a one-electron reducing agent such as samarium(II) iodide.

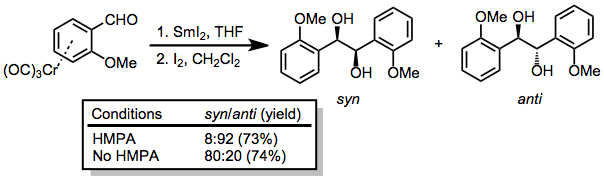

Benzylic cations of chromium arene complexes are conformationally stable, and undergo only exo attack to afford S_{N}1 products stereospecifically, with retention of configuration. Propargyl and oxonium cations undergo retentive substitution reactions, and even β carbocations react with a significant degree of retention.

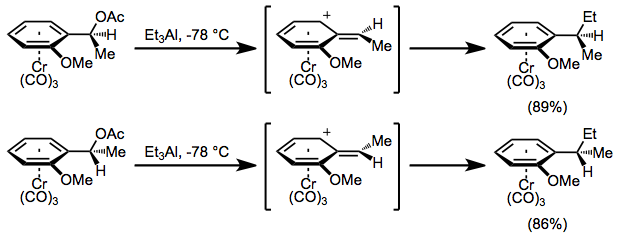

Benzylic anions of chromium arene complexes exhibit similar reactivity to cations. They are also conformationally restricted and undergo substitution reactions with retention of stereochemistry at the benzylic carbon. In the example below, complexation of the pyridine nitrogen to lithium is essential for high stereoselectivity.

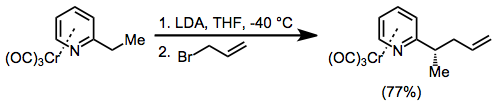

Nucleophilic addition to styrenes followed by quenching with an electrophile leads to cis products with essentially complete stereoselectivity.

(12)

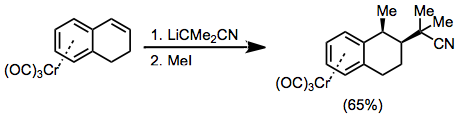

Diastereoselective reduction of styrenes is possible with samarium(II) iodide. A distant alkene is untouched during this reaction, which provides the reduced alkylarene product in high yield.

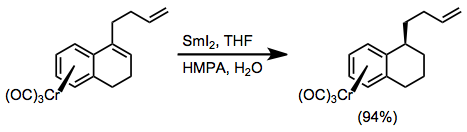

== Related reactions ==
Complexation of a haloarene to chromium increases its propensity to undergo oxidative addition. Suzuki cross coupling of a planar chiral chromium haloarene complex with an aryl boronic acid is thus a viable method for the synthesis of axially chiral biaryls. In the example below, the syn isomer is formed in preference to the anti isomer; when R^{2} is the formyl group, the selectivity reverses.

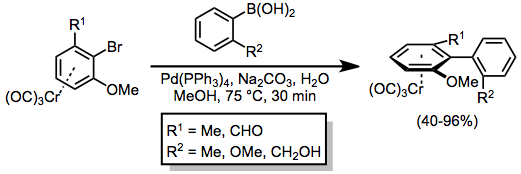

Tetralones complexed to chromium may be deprotonated without side reactions. Alkylation of the resulting enolate proceeds with complete diastereoselectivity to afford the exo product.

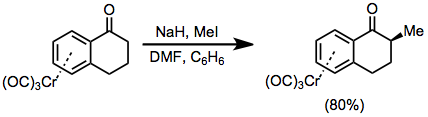
