= Ferrocene =

Organometallic compound: Fe(II) sandwiched between two cyclopentadienyl rings

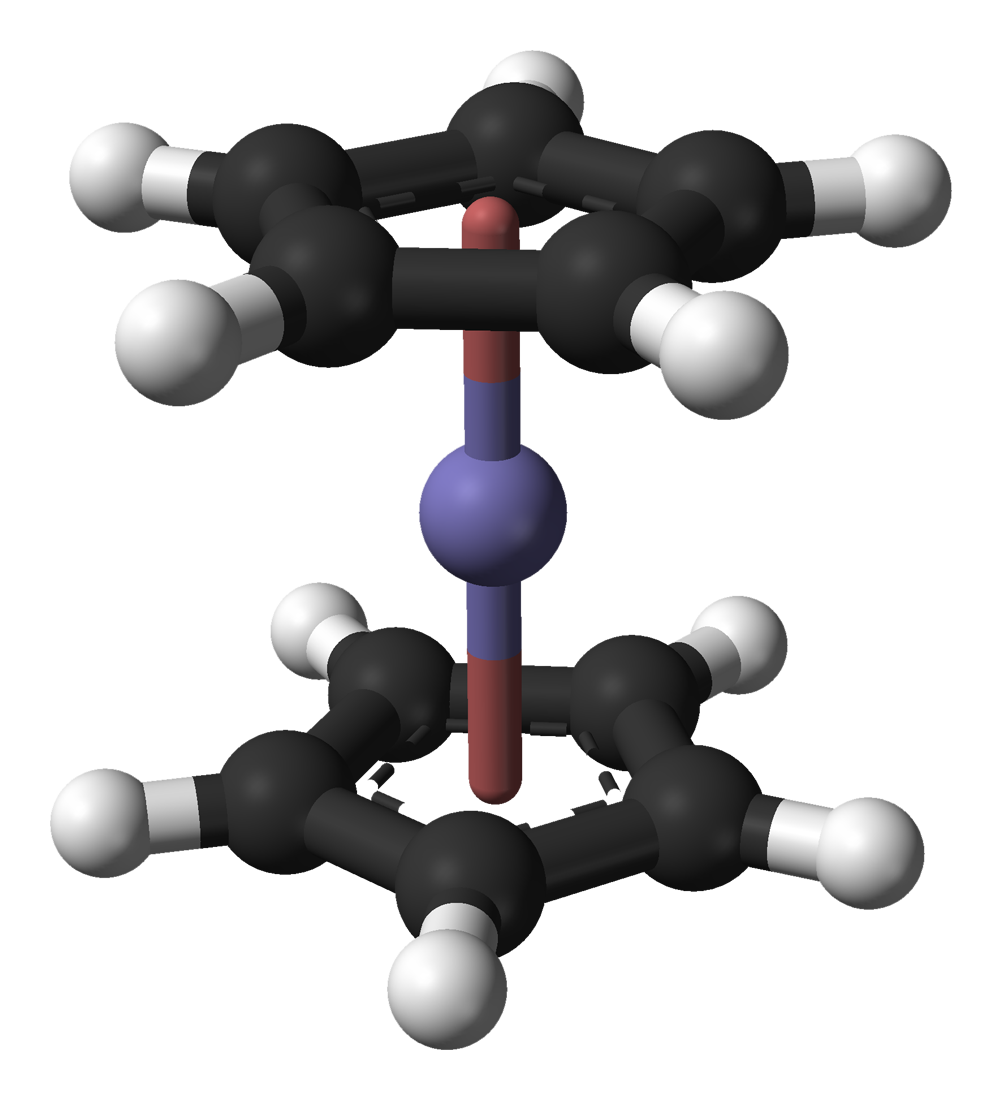

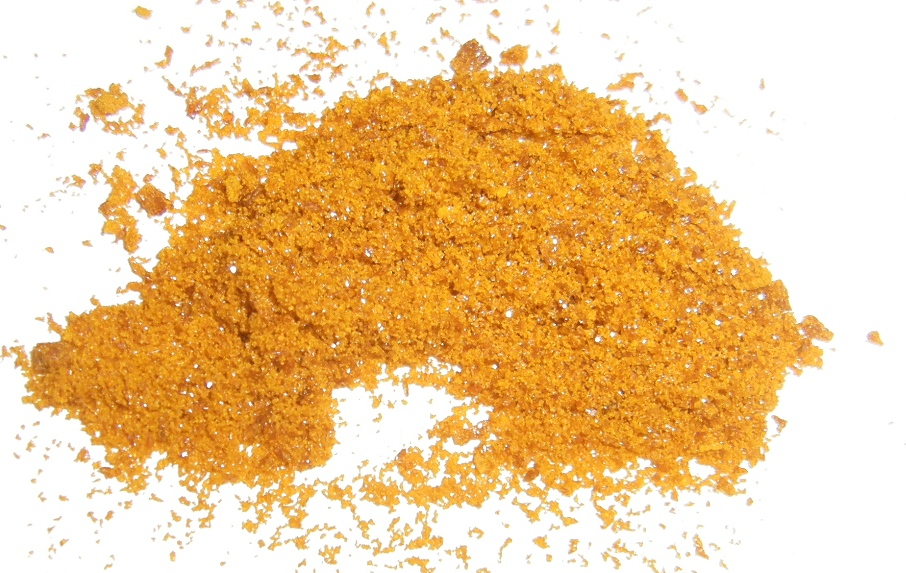
Ferrocene powder
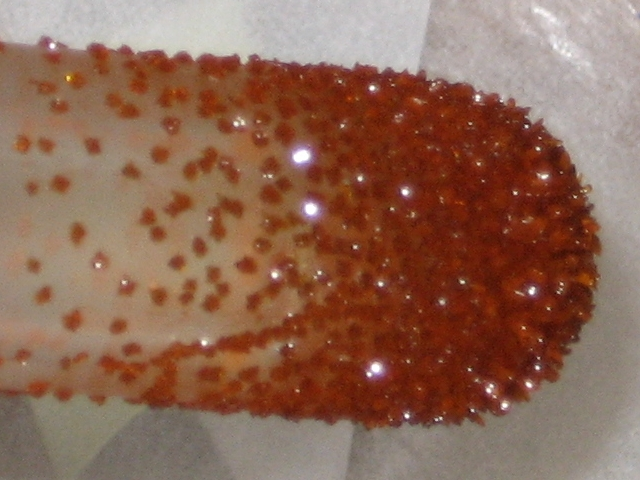
Ferrocene crystals purified by vacuum-sublimation

Names
- Preferred IUPAC name Ferrocene
- Other names: Dicyclopentadienyl iron; Bis(η^{5}-cyclopentadienyl)iron; Iron(II) cyclopentadienide

Identifiers
| CAS Number | 102-54-5 |
| ChEBI | CHEBI:30672 |
| ChemSpider | 7329 |
| ECHA InfoCard | 100.002.764 |
| PubChem CID | 11985121 |
| UNII | U96PKG90JQ |
| UN number | 1325 |
| CompTox Dashboard (EPA) | DTXSID9025326 |
- InChI: InChI=1S/2C5H5.Fe/c2*1-2-4-5-3-1;/h2*1-5H;/q2*-1;+2 Key: KTWOOEGAPBSYNW-UHFFFAOYSA-N; InChI=1/2C5H5.Fe/c2*1-2-4-5-3-1;/h2*1-5H;/q2*-1;+2 Key: KTWOOEGAPBSYNW-UHFFFAOYAZ
- SMILES: [CH-]1C=CC=C1.[CH-]1C=CC=C1.[Fe+2]

Properties
| Chemical formula | Fe(C_{5}H_{5})_{2} |
| Molar mass | 186.035 g·mol^{−1} |
| Appearance | light orange powder |
| Odor | camphor-like |
| Density | 1.107 g/cm^{3} (0 °C (32 °F; 273 K)); 1.490 g/cm^{3} (20 °C (68 °F; 293 K)) |
| Melting point | 175 °C (347 °F; 448 K) |
| Boiling point | 249 °C (480 °F; 522 K) |
| Solubility in water | 0.0001 g/L (20 °C (68 °F; 293 K)) |
| Solubility in ethanol | soluble |
| Solubility in benzene | soluble |
| Solubility in diethyl ether | soluble |
| Solubility in nitric acid | soluble (in dilute) |
| log P | 3.711 (22 °C (72 °F; 295 K)) |
| Vapor pressure | 1 Pa (0.00015 psi) (25.00 °C; 77.00 °F (298.15 K)); 7.5 Pa (0.0011 psi) (47 °C; 116 °F (320 K)); 80 Pa (0.012 psi) (77 °C; 170 °F (350 K)); 1 kPa (0.15 psi) (117 °C; 242 °F (390 K); 12.3 kPa (1.8 psi) (167 °C; 332 °F (440 K)) |
| Electrical resistivity | 10^{12} Ω⋅m |
| Band gap | 1.22 eV |

Structure
| Point group | D_{5h} (eclipsed); D_{5d} (staggered) |
| Molecular shape | Sandwich structure with iron centre |

Hazards
- GHS labelling
| Pictograms | (GHS02: Flammable) (GHS08: Health hazard) (GHS07: Exclamation mark) (GHS09: Environmental hazard) |
| Signal word | Danger |
| Hazard statements | H228, H302+H332, H360, H373, H401, H410 |
| Precautionary statements | P201, P202, P210, P240, P241, P260, P264, P270, P271, P273, P280, P301+P312+P330, P304+P340+P312, P308+P313, P370+P378, P391, P405, P501 |
| NFPA 704 (fire diamond) | 2 2 0 |
| Threshold limit value (TLV) | 10 mg/m^{3} (TWA) |
- Lethal dose or concentration (LD, LC)
| LD_{50} (median dose) | 1320 mg/kg (oral, rat); >3000 mg/kg (dermal, rat) |
- NIOSH (US health exposure limits)
| PEL (Permissible) | TWA 15 mg/m^{3} (total); TWA 5 mg/m^{3} (resp) |
| REL (Recommended) | TWA 10 mg/m^{3} (total); TWA 5 mg/m^{3} (resp) |
| IDLH (Immediate danger) | N.D. |

Related compounds
| Other anions | Ferrocenium tetrafluoroborate; Ferrocenium hexafluorophosphate |
| Related compounds | 1Fe-LSD; Metallocene; Bis(benzene)chromium; [1,1′-Bis(diphenylphosphino)ferrocene] palladium(II) dichloride |
- Except where otherwise noted, data are given for materials in their standard state (at 25 °C [77 °F], 100 kPa). verify (what is ?) Infobox references

The image provide the structure, hazard statement and solubility of ferrocene, acetylferrocene and bromocresol

Ferrocene is an organometallic compound with the formula Fe(C_{5}H_{5})_{2}. The molecule is a cyclopentadienyl complex consisting of two cyclopentadienyl rings sandwiching a central iron atom. It is an orange solid with a camphor-like odor that sublimes above room temperature, and is soluble in most organic solvents. It is remarkable for its stability: it is unaffected by air, water, or strong bases, and can be heated to 400 °C (752 °F) without decomposition. In oxidizing conditions it can reversibly react with strong acids to form the ferrocenium cation Fe(C_{5}H_{5})^{+}_{2}.

The first reported synthesis of ferrocene was in 1951. Its unusual stability puzzled chemists, and required the development of new theory to explain its formation and bonding. The discovery of ferrocene and its many structural analogues, known as metallocenes, sparked excitement and led to a rapid growth in the discipline of organometallic chemistry. Geoffrey Wilkinson and Ernst Otto Fischer, both of whom worked on elucidating the structure of ferrocene, later shared the 1973 Nobel Prize in Chemistry for their work on organometallic sandwich compounds. Ferrocene itself has no large-scale applications, but has found more niche uses in catalysis, as a fuel additive, as an internal standard in electrochemical research, and as a tool in undergraduate education.

== History ==
=== Discovery ===
Ferrocene was discovered by accident twice. The first known synthesis may have been made in the late 1940s by unknown researchers at Union Carbide, who tried to pass hot cyclopentadiene vapor through an iron pipe. The vapor reacted with the pipe wall, creating a "yellow sludge" that clogged the pipe. Years later, a sample of the sludge that had been saved was obtained and analyzed by Eugene O. Brimm, shortly after reading Kealy and Pauson's article, and was found to consist of ferrocene.

The second time was around 1950, when Samuel A. Miller, John A. Tebboth, and John F. Tremaine, researchers at British Oxygen, were attempting to synthesize amines from hydrocarbons and nitrogen in a modification of the Haber process. When they tried to react cyclopentadiene with nitrogen at 300 °C (572 °F), at atmospheric pressure, they were disappointed to see the hydrocarbon react with some source of iron, yielding ferrocene. While they too observed its remarkable stability, they put the observation aside and did not publish it until after Pauson reported his findings. Kealy and Pauson were later provided with a sample by Miller et al., who confirmed that the products were the same compound.

In 1951, Peter L. Pauson and Thomas J. Kealy at Duquesne University attempted to prepare fulvalene ((C_{5}H_{4})_{2}) by oxidative dimerization of cyclopentadiene (C_{5}H_{6}). To that end, they reacted the Grignard compound cyclopentadienyl magnesium bromide in diethyl ether with iron(III) chloride as an oxidizer. However, instead of the expected fulvalene, they obtained a light orange powder of "remarkable stability", with the formula C_{10}H_{10}Fe.

=== Determining the structure ===
Pauson and Kealy's original (incorrect) notion of ferrocene's molecular structure.

Pauson and Kealy conjectured that the compound had two cyclopentadienyl groups, each with a single covalent bond from the saturated carbon atom to the iron atom. However, that structure was inconsistent with then-existing bonding models and did not explain the unexpected stability of the compound, and chemists struggled to find the correct structure.

The structure was deduced and reported independently by three groups in 1952. Robert Burns Woodward, Geoffrey Wilkinson, et al. observed that the compound was diamagnetic and nonpolar. A few months later they described its reactions as being typical of aromatic compounds such as benzene. The name ferrocene was coined by Mark Whiting, a postdoc with Woodward. Ernst Otto Fischer and Wolfgang Pfab also noted ferrocene's diamagneticity and high symmetry. They also synthesized nickelocene and cobaltocene and confirmed they had the same structure. Fischer described the structure as Doppelkegelstruktur ("double-cone structure"), although the term "sandwich" came to be preferred by British and American chemists. Philip Frank Eiland and Raymond Pepinsky confirmed the structure through X-ray crystallography and later by NMR spectroscopy.

The "sandwich" structure of ferrocene was very novel and led to intensive theoretical studies. Application of molecular orbital theory with the assumption of a Fe^{2+} centre between two cyclopentadienide anions C_{5}H^{−}_{5} resulted in the successful Dewar–Chatt–Duncanson model, allowing correct prediction of the geometry of the molecule as well as explaining its remarkable stability.

=== Impact ===
The discovery of ferrocene was considered so significant that Wilkinson and Fischer shared the 1973 Nobel Prize in Chemistry "for their pioneering work, performed independently, on the chemistry of the organometallic, called sandwich compounds".

== Structure and bonding ==
Mössbauer spectroscopy indicates that the iron center in ferrocene should be assigned the +2 oxidation state. Each cyclopentadienyl (Cp) ring should then be allocated a single negative charge. Thus ferrocene could be described as iron(II) bis(cyclopentadienide), Fe^{2+}[C_{5}H^{−}_{5}]_{2}.

Each ring has six π-electrons, which makes them aromatic according to Hückel's rule. These π-electrons are then shared with the metal via covalent bonding. Since Fe^{2+} has six d-electrons, the complex attains an 18-electron configuration, which accounts for its stability. In modern notation, this sandwich structural model of the ferrocene molecule is denoted as Fe(η^{5}-C_{5}H_{5})_{2}, where η denotes hapticity, the number of atoms through which each ring binds.

The carbon–carbon bond distances around each five-membered ring are all 1.440 Å, and all Fe–C bond distances are 2.064 Å. The Cp rings rotate with a low barrier about the Cp_{(centroid)}–Fe–Cp_{(centroid)} axis, as observed by measurements on substituted derivatives of ferrocene using ^{1}H and ^{13}C nuclear magnetic resonance spectroscopy. For example, methylferrocene (CH_{3}C_{5}H_{4}FeC_{5}H_{5}) exhibits a singlet for the C_{5}H_{5} ring.

From room temperature down to 164 K (−164 °F; −109 °C), X-ray crystallography yields the monoclinic space group; the cyclopentadienide rings are a staggered conformation, resulting in a centrosymmetric molecule, with symmetry group D_{5d}. However, below 110 K (−262 °F; −163 °C), ferrocene crystallizes in an orthorhombic crystal lattice in which the Cp rings are ordered and eclipsed, so that the molecule has symmetry group D_{5h}. In the gas phase, electron diffraction and computational studies show that the Cp rings are eclipsed. While ferrocene has no permanent dipole moment at room temperature, between 172.8 and 163.5 K (−148.6 and −165.4 °F; −100.3 and −109.6 °C) the molecule exhibits an "incommensurate modulation", breaking the D_{5} symmetry and acquiring an electric dipole.

In solution, eclipsed D_{5h} ferrocene was determined to dominate over the staggered D_{5d} conformer, as suggested by both Fourier-transform infrared spectroscopy and DFT calculations.

== Synthesis ==
=== Early methods ===
The first reported syntheses of ferrocene were nearly simultaneous. Pauson and Kealy synthesised ferrocene using iron(III) chloride and cyclopentadienyl magnesium bromide. A redox reaction produces iron(II) chloride. The formation of fulvalene (the intended outcome), does not occur.

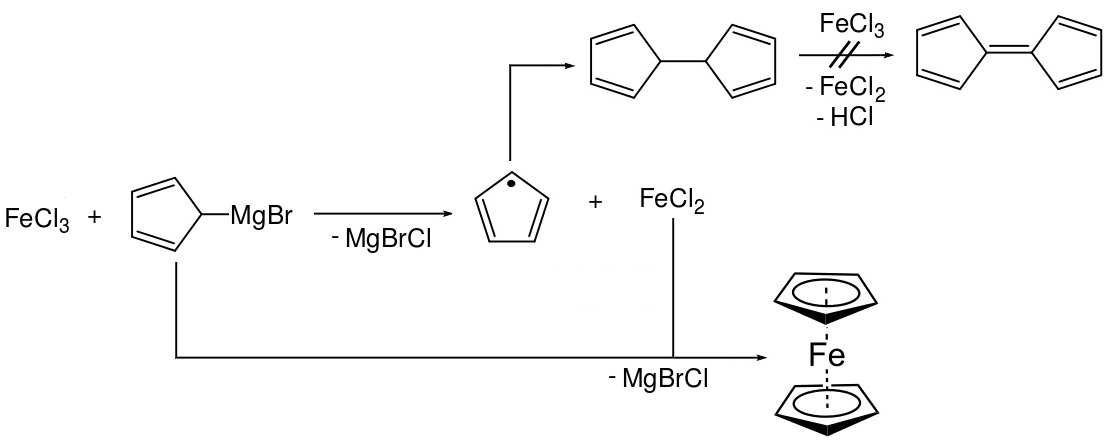

The Miller et al. approach to ferrocene

Another early synthesis of ferrocene was by Miller et al., who treated metallic iron with gaseous cyclopentadiene at elevated temperature. An approach using iron pentacarbonyl was also reported.

Fe(CO)_{5} + 2 C_{5}H_{6} → Fe(C_{5}H_{5})_{2} + 5 CO + H_{2}

=== Via alkali cyclopentadienide ===
More efficient preparative methods are generally a modification of the original transmetalation sequence using either commercially available sodium cyclopentadienide or freshly cracked cyclopentadiene deprotonated with potassium hydroxide and reacted with anhydrous iron(II) chloride in ethereal solvents.

Modern modifications of Pauson and Kealy's original Grignard approach are known:

- Using sodium cyclopentadienide: 2 NaC_{5}H_{5} + FeCl_{2} → Fe(C_{5}H_{5})_{2} + 2 NaCl
- Using freshly-cracked cyclopentadiene: FeCl_{2}·4H_{2}O + 2 C_{5}H_{6} + 2 KOH → Fe(C_{5}H_{5})_{2} + 2 KCl + 6 H_{2}O
- Using an iron(II) salt with a Grignard reagent: 2 C_{5}H_{5}MgBr + FeCl_{2} → Fe(C_{5}H_{5})_{2} + 2 MgBrCl

Even some amine bases (such as diethylamine) can be used for the deprotonation, though the reaction proceeds more slowly than when using stronger bases:

2 C_{5}H_{6} + 2 (CH_{3}CH_{2})_{2}NH + FeCl_{2} → Fe(C_{5}H_{5})_{2} + 2 (CH_{3}CH_{2})_{2}NH_{2}Cl

Direct transmetalation can also be used to prepare ferrocene from some other metallocenes, such as manganocene:

FeCl_{2} + Mn(C_{5}H_{5})_{2} → MnCl_{2} + Fe(C_{5}H_{5})_{2}

== Reactions ==
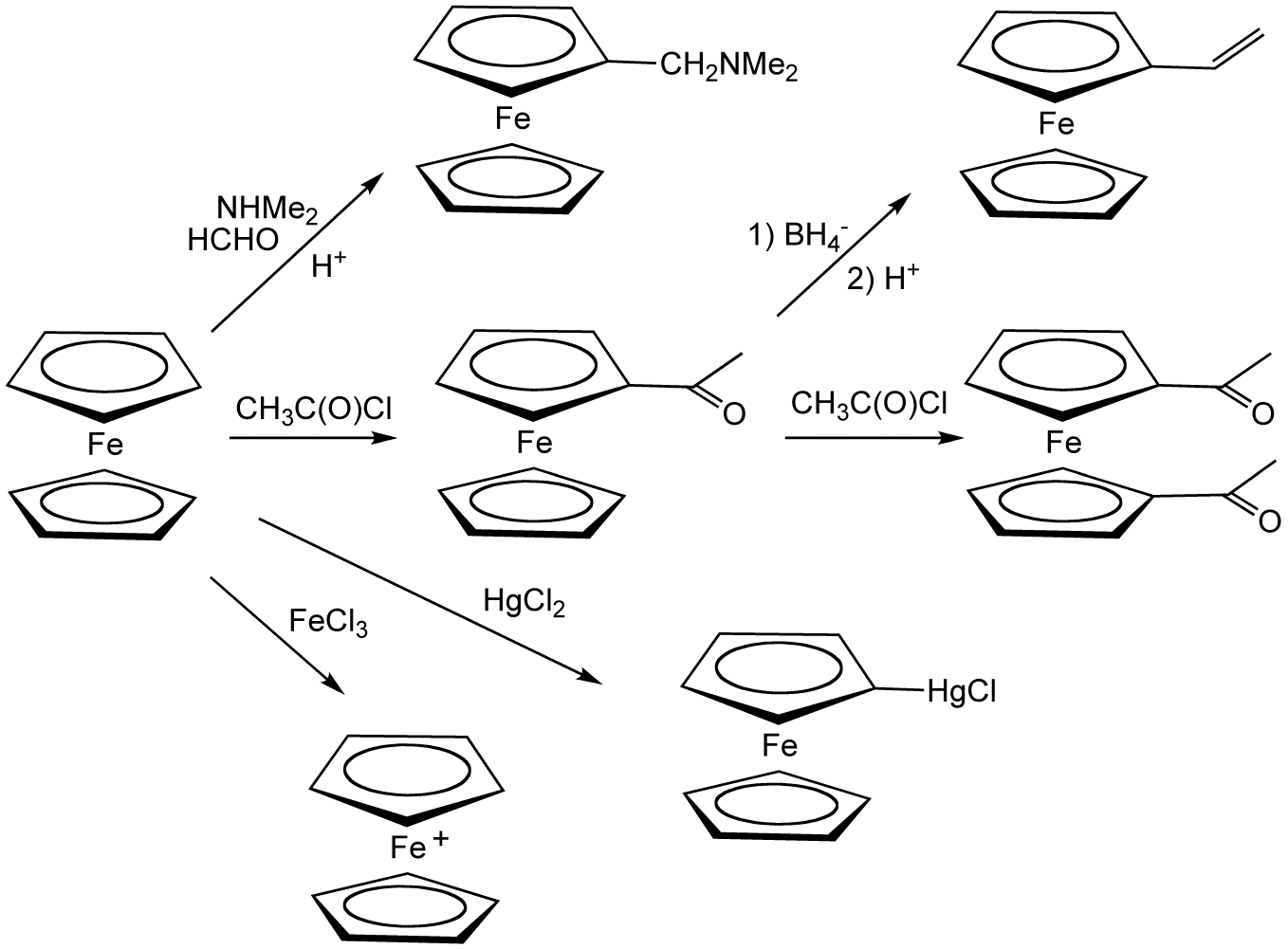
Important ferrocene reactions

=== Aromatic substitution ===
Ferrocene is an aromatic substance. Electrophiles typically substitute onto, rather than add to, the cyclopentadienyl ligands. For example, a common undergraduate experiment performs Friedel-Crafts acylation with acetic anhydride and a phosphoric acid catalyst. Just as this reagent mixture converts benzene to acetophenone, it converts ferrocene to acetylferrocene.

In the presence of aluminium chloride, dimethylaminophosphorus dichloride (Me_{2}NPCl_{2}) and ferrocene react to give ferrocenyl dichlorophosphine, whereas treatment with dichlorophenylphosphine under similar conditions forms P,P-diferrocenyl-P-phenyl phosphine. Vilsmeier-Haack formylation using N-methylformanilide and phosphorus oxychloride gives ferrocenecarboxaldehyde.

Unsubstituted ferrocene undergoes aromatic substitution more easily than benzene, because electrophiles can attack the metal ion before rearranging to the Wheland intermediate. Thus ferrocene reacts with the weak electrophile Phosphorus pentasulfide (P_{4}S_{10}) to form a diferrocenyl-dithiadiphosphetane disulfide. Mannich conditions suffice to iminylate ferrocene to N,N-Dimethylaminomethylferrocene. For stronger electrophiles, the major reaction pathway is direct (exo) attack on the ring, without any metal participation.

Superacidic protonation does not complete aromatic substitution, but rather traps the unrearranged bent intermediate hydrido salt, [Cp_{2}FeH]PF_{6}. Strongly-oxidizing electrophiles, such as halogens and nitric acid, neither rearrange to a Wheland intermediate nor coordinate to iron, instead generating ferrocenium salts (see § Redox chemistry).

In accordance with cluster compound theory, ferrocene's rings behave as a single delocalized π system. Electronic perturbations to one ring propagate to the other. For example, introduction of a deactivating aldehyde group on one ring inhibits formylation of the other ring as well.

=== Metallation ===
Ferrocene readily metallates. Ferrocene reacts with butyllithium to give 1,1′-dilithioferrocene, which is a versatile nucleophile. In combination with butyllithium, tert-butyllithium produces monolithioferrocene. Likewise ferrocene mercurates to give ferrocendiyl dimercuriacetate.

Further reaction gives the nitro, halo-, and borono derivatives.

=== Redox chemistry ===
The one-electron oxidized derivative of biferrocene has attracted much research attention.

Ferrocene undergoes a one-electron oxidation at around 0.4 V versus a saturated calomel electrode (SCE), becoming [ferrocenium]^{+} (or [ferricinium]^{+}), often abbreviated Fc^{+}. This reversible oxidation is used as a reference electrode and internal standard in non-aqueous electrochemistry. While its exact potential is dependent on conditions, values including (Fc^{+})/Fc = 0.64 V versus the standard hydrogen electrode have been reported. The remarkably reversible oxidation-reduction behaviour has been extensively used to control electron-transfer processes in electrochemical and photochemical systems. Ferrocenium tetrafluoroborate is commonly employed as a one-electron oxidant.

Substituents on the cyclopentadienyl ligands alter the redox potential in the expected way: electron-withdrawing groups such as a carboxylic acid shift the potential in the anodic direction (i.e. made more positive), whereas electron-releasing groups such as methyl groups shift the potential in the cathodic direction (more negative). Thus, decamethylferrocene is much more easily oxidised than ferrocene and can even be oxidised to the corresponding dication.

== Stereochemistry of substituted ferrocenes ==
A planar chiral ferrocene derivative

Monosubstituted ferrocenes have the formula (C_{5}H_{5})Fe(C_{5}H_{4}R). These derivatives are often referred to as ferrocenyl (abbreviated Fc) compounds. Examples include ferrocenyl aldehyde (FcCHO), ferrocenyl carboxylic acid (FcCO_{2}H), and ferrocenyl methanol (FcCH_{2}OH). When the substituent is chiral, then the entire molecule is chiral.

Disubstituted ferrocenes can exist as either 1,2-, 1,3- or 1,1′- isomers, none of which are interconvertible. Ferrocenes that are asymmetrically disubstituted on one ring are chiral – for example [CpFe(EtC_{5}H_{3}Me)]. This planar chirality arises despite no single atom being a stereogenic centre. Several approaches have been developed to asymmetrically 1,1′-functionalise the ferrocene.

== Applications of ferrocene and its derivatives ==
Ferrocene and its numerous derivatives have no large-scale applications, but have many niche uses that exploit the unusual structure (ligand scaffolds, pharmaceutical candidates), robustness (anti-knock formulations, precursors to materials), and redox (reagents and redox standards).

=== Ligand scaffolds ===
Chiral ferrocenyl phosphines are employed as ligands for transition-metal catalyzed reactions. Some of them have found industrial applications in the synthesis of pharmaceuticals and agrochemicals. For example, the diphosphine 1,1′-bis(diphenylphosphino)ferrocene (dppf) is a valued ligand for palladium-coupling reactions and Josiphos ligand is useful for hydrogenation catalysis. They are named after the technician who made the first one, Josi Puleo.

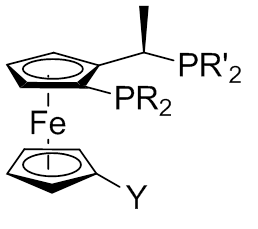
Josiphos ligand.

=== Fuel additives ===
Ferrocene and its derivatives are antiknock agents used in the fuel for petrol engines. They are safer than previously used tetraethyllead. Petrol additive solutions containing ferrocene can be added to unleaded petrol to enable its use in vintage cars designed to run on leaded petrol. The iron-containing deposits formed from ferrocene can form a conductive coating on spark plug surfaces. Ferrocene polyglycol copolymers, prepared by effecting a polycondensation reaction between a ferrocene derivative and a substituted dihydroxy alcohol, has promise as a component of rocket propellants. These copolymers provide rocket propellants with heat stability, serving as a propellant binder and controlling propellant burn rate.

Ferrocene has been found to be effective at reducing smoke and sulfur trioxide produced when burning coal. The addition by any practical means, impregnating the coal or adding ferrocene to the combustion chamber, can significantly reduce the amount of these undesirable byproducts, even with a small amount of the metal cyclopentadienyl compound.

=== Pharmaceuticals ===
Ferrocerone

Ferrocene derivatives have been investigated as drugs, with one compound ferrocerone approved for use in the USSR in the 1970s as an iron supplement, though it is no longer marketed today. Only one drug has entered clinical trials in recent years, Ferroquine (7-chloro-N-(2-((dimethylamino)methyl)ferrocenyl)quinolin-4-amine), an antimalarial, which has reached Phase IIb trials. Ferrocene-containing polymer-based drug delivery systems have been investigated.

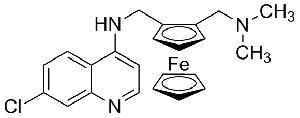
Ferroquine

The anticancer activity of ferrocene derivatives was first investigated in the late 1970s, when derivatives bearing amine or amide groups were tested against lymphocytic leukemia. Some ferrocenium salts exhibit anticancer activity, but no compound has seen evaluation in the clinic. Ferrocene derivatives have strong inhibitory activity against human lung cancer cell line A549, colorectal cancer cell line HCT116, and breast cancer cell line MCF-7. An experimental drug was reported which is a ferrocenyl version of tamoxifen. The idea is that the tamoxifen will bind to the estrogen binding sites, resulting in cytotoxicity.

Ferrocifens are exploited for cancer applications by a French biotech, Feroscan, founded by Pr. Gerard Jaouen.

=== Solid rocket propellant ===
Ferrocene and related derivatives are used as powerful burn rate catalysts in ammonium perchlorate composite propellant.

== Derivatives and variations ==
As a substituent on alkyl (or similar) compounds, ferrocene is one of the strongest σ-donating groups known.

Ferrocene analogues can be prepared with variants of cyclopentadienyl. For example, bisindenyliron and bisfluorenyliron.

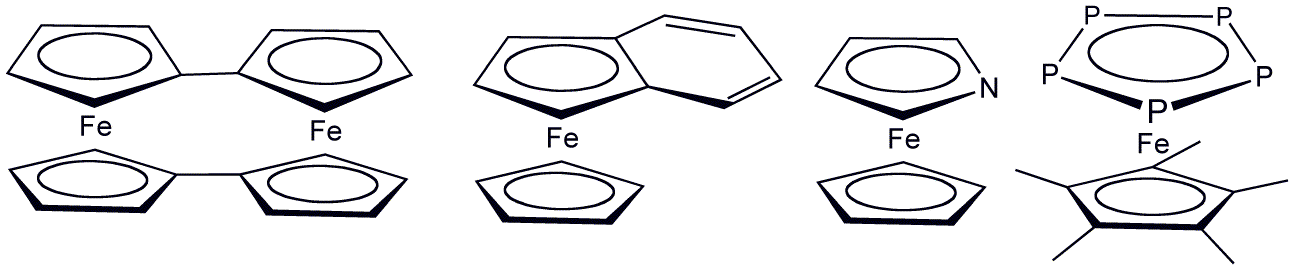
Various ferrocene derivatives where cyclopentadienyl has been replaced by related ligands

Carbon atoms can be replaced by heteroatoms as illustrated by Fe(η^{5}-C_{5}Me_{5})(η^{5}-P_{5}) and Fe(η^{5}-C_{5}H_{5})(η^{5}-C_{4}H_{4}N) ("azaferrocene"). Azaferrocene arises from decarbonylation of Fe(η^{5}-C_{5}H_{5})(CO)_{2}(η^{1}-pyrrole) in cyclohexane. This compound on boiling under reflux in benzene is converted to ferrocene.

Iron arene complexes are possible, but bis(arene)s are difficult to stabilize. The bis(benzene)iron(II) cation, isoelectronic with bis(benzene)chromium, is unstable against nucleophilic attack, and decomposes "instantaneously" in acetonitrile. It can be observed, however, in metastable nitromethane solution.

Because of the ease of substitution, many structurally unusual ferrocene derivatives have been prepared. For example, the penta(ferrocenyl)cyclopentadienyl ligand, features a cyclopentadienyl anion derivatized with five ferrocene substituents.

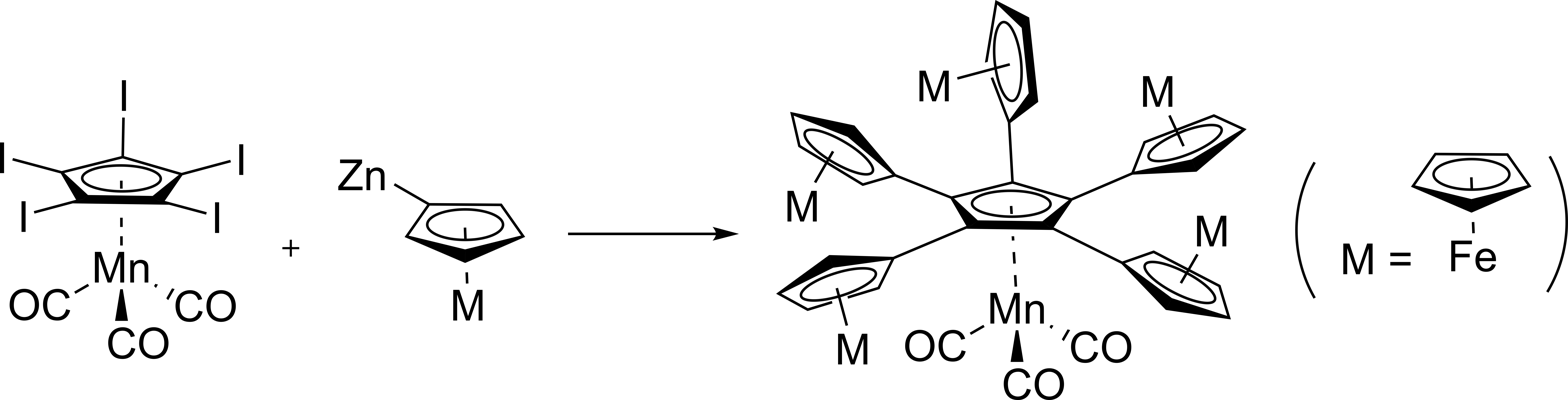
Penta(ferrocenyl)cyclopentadienyl ligand

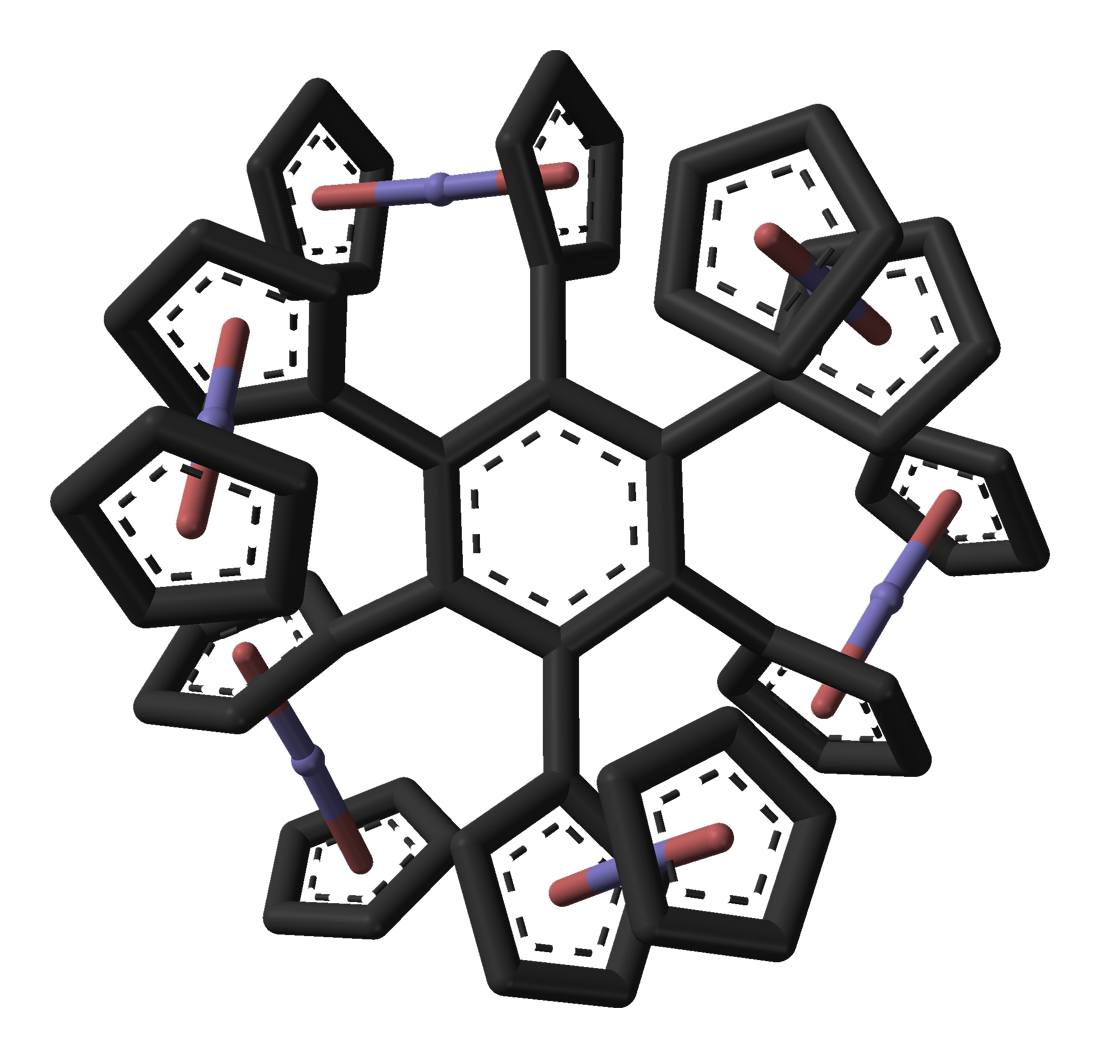
Structure of hexaferrocenylbenzene

In hexaferrocenylbenzene, C_{6}[(η^{5}-C_{5}H_{4})Fe(η^{5}-C_{5}H_{5})]_{6}, all six positions on a benzene molecule have ferrocenyl substituents (R). X-ray diffraction analysis of this compound confirms that the cyclopentadienyl ligands are not co-planar with the benzene core but have alternating dihedral angles of 30° and −80°. Due to steric crowding the ferrocenyl bonds are slightly bent with angles of 177° and have elongated C-Fe bonds. The quaternary cyclopentadienyl carbon atoms are also pyramidalized. Also, the benzene core has a chair conformation with dihedral angles of 14° and displays bond length alternation between 1.411 and 1.427 Å, both indications of steric crowding of the substituents.

The synthesis of hexaferrocenylbenzene has been reported using Negishi coupling of hexaiodobenzene and diferrocenylzinc, using tris(dibenzylideneacetone)dipalladium(0) as catalyst, in tetrahydrofuran:

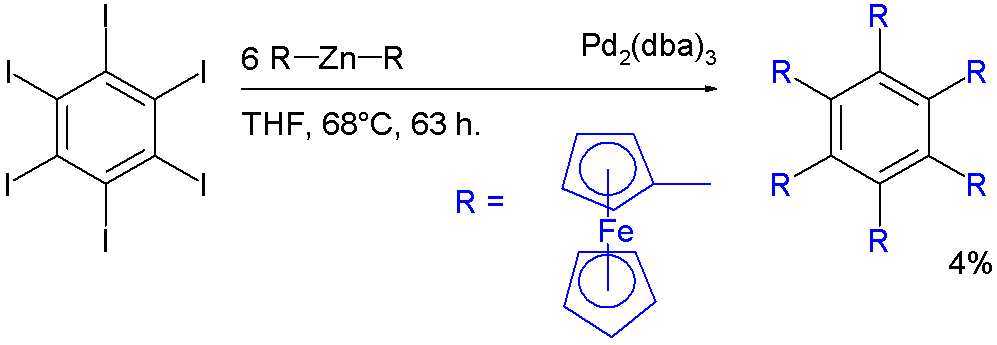

The yield is only 4%, which is further evidence consistent with substantial steric crowding around the arene core.

=== Materials chemistry ===
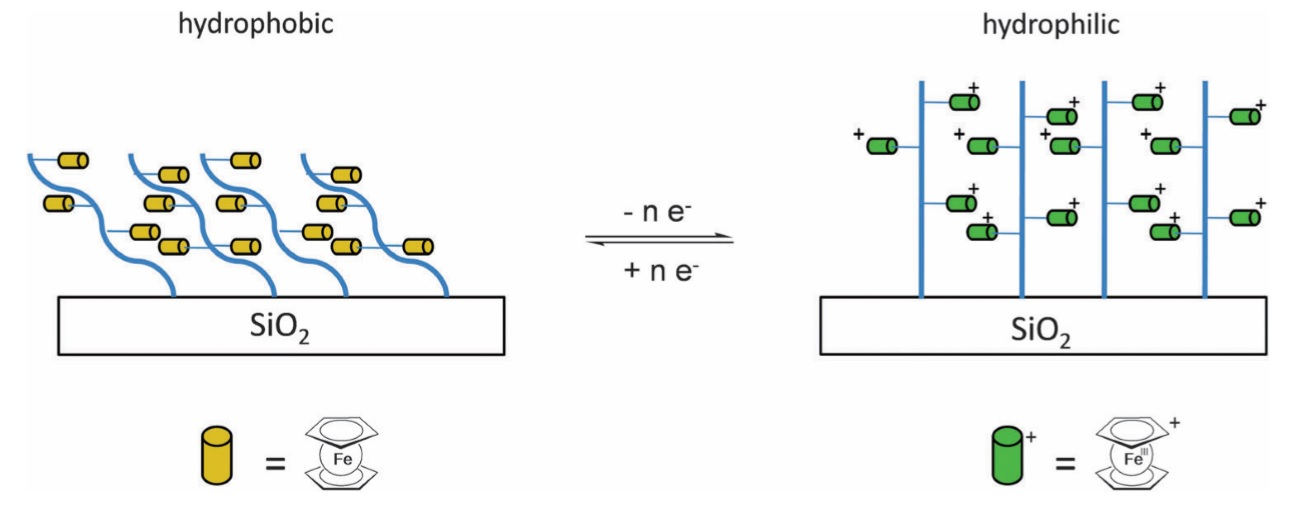
Strands of an uncharged ferrocene-substituted polymer are tethered to a hydrophobic silica surface. Oxidation of the ferrocenyl groups produces a hydrophilic surface due to electrostatic attractions between the resulting charges and the polar solvent.

Ferrocene, a precursor to iron nanoparticles, can be used as a catalyst for the production of carbon nanotubes. Vinylferrocene can be converted to (polyvinylferrocene, PVFc), a ferrocenyl version of polystyrene (the phenyl groups are replaced with ferrocenyl groups). Another polyferrocene which can be formed is poly(2-(methacryloyloxy)ethyl ferrocenecarboxylate), PFcMA. In addition to using organic polymer backbones, these pendant ferrocene units have been attached to inorganic backbones such as polysiloxanes, polyphosphazenes, and polyphosphinoboranes, (−PH(R)−BH_{2}−)_{n}, and the resulting materials exhibit unusual physical and electronic properties relating to the ferrocene / ferrocinium redox couple. Both PVFc and PFcMA have been tethered onto silica wafers and the wettability measured when the polymer chains are uncharged and when the ferrocene moieties are oxidised to produce positively charged groups. The contact angle with water on the PFcMA-coated wafers was 70° smaller following oxidation, while in the case of PVFc the decrease was 30°, and the switching of wettability is reversible. In the PFcMA case, the effect of lengthening the chains and hence introducing more ferrocene groups is significantly larger reductions in the contact angle upon oxidation.

== See also ==
- Ethylferrocene
- Josiphos ligands
