= Cyclopentadienyliron dicarbonyl methyl =

Names
- Other names FpMe

Identifiers
CAS Number	12080-06-7
3D model (JSmol)	Interactive image
- InChI: InChI=1S/C5H5.2CO.CH3.Fe/c1-2-4-5-3-1;2*1-2;;/h1-5H;;;1H3;/q-1;;;;+1 Key: GLKDETLONPSPJC-UHFFFAOYSA-N
- SMILES: [CH-]1C=CC=C1.C[Fe+]([C]=O)[C]=O

Properties
Chemical formula	C_{8}H_{5}FeO_{2}
Molar mass	188.971 g·mol^{−1}
Appearance	orange wax
Melting point	72–82 °C (162–180 °F; 345–355 K)
- Except where otherwise noted, data are given for materials in their standard state (at 25 °C [77 °F], 100 kPa). Infobox references

Cyclopentadienyliron dicarbonyl methyl is an organoiron complex with the formula (C_{5}H_{5})Fe(CO)_{2}CH_{3}. It is an orange volatile solid that is sensitive to air.

== Synthesis ==
The compound arises from cyclopentadienyliron dicarbonyl dimer. Reduction of the latter give sodium cyclopentadienyl iron dicarbonyl, which can be alkylated.

== Reactions ==
The compound was influential in the development of organometallic chemistry. Under the influence of UV radiation, one CO ligand can be replaced by phosphine ligands to give chiral derivatives (C_{5}H_{5})Fe(CO)(PR_{3})CH_{3}. When heated with phosphine ligands, the chiral acetyl complex (C_{5}H_{5})Fe(CO)(PR_{3})COCH_{3} arises instead. Many reagents insert into the Fe-CH_{3} bond including sulfur dioxide, tetracyanoethylene, and stannous chloride. The compound catalyzes the scission of nitriles:

R'CN + HSiR_{3} → R_{3}SiCN + R'SiR_{3}
