= Dietmar Seyferth =

German chemist (1929–2020)

Dietmar Seyferth (January 11, 1929 – June 6, 2020) was an emeritus professor of chemistry at the Massachusetts Institute of Technology. He published widely on topics in organometallic chemistry and was the founding editor of the journal Organometallics.

== Biography ==
Seyferth was born in 1929 in Chemnitz, Saxony, Germany, and received his college education at the University of Buffalo. His PhD thesis, which focused on main group chemistry was completed under the mentorship of Eugene G. Rochow at Harvard. Seyferth spent his entire academic career at MIT, where he initially concentrated on organophosphorus, organosilicon, and organomercury chemistry. He also contributed to organocobalt chemistry and organoiron chemistry, e.g. the popularization of Fe_{2}S_{2}(CO)_{6}. He died on Saturday, June 6, 2020, due to complications from COVID-19 during the COVID-19 pandemic in Massachusetts.

Seyferth has been widely recognized, notably with the American Chemical Society Award in Organometallic Chemistry and election to the U.S. National Academy of Sciences.

== See also ==
- Seyferth–Gilbert homologation
