= Cyclopentadienyliron dicarbonyl iodide =

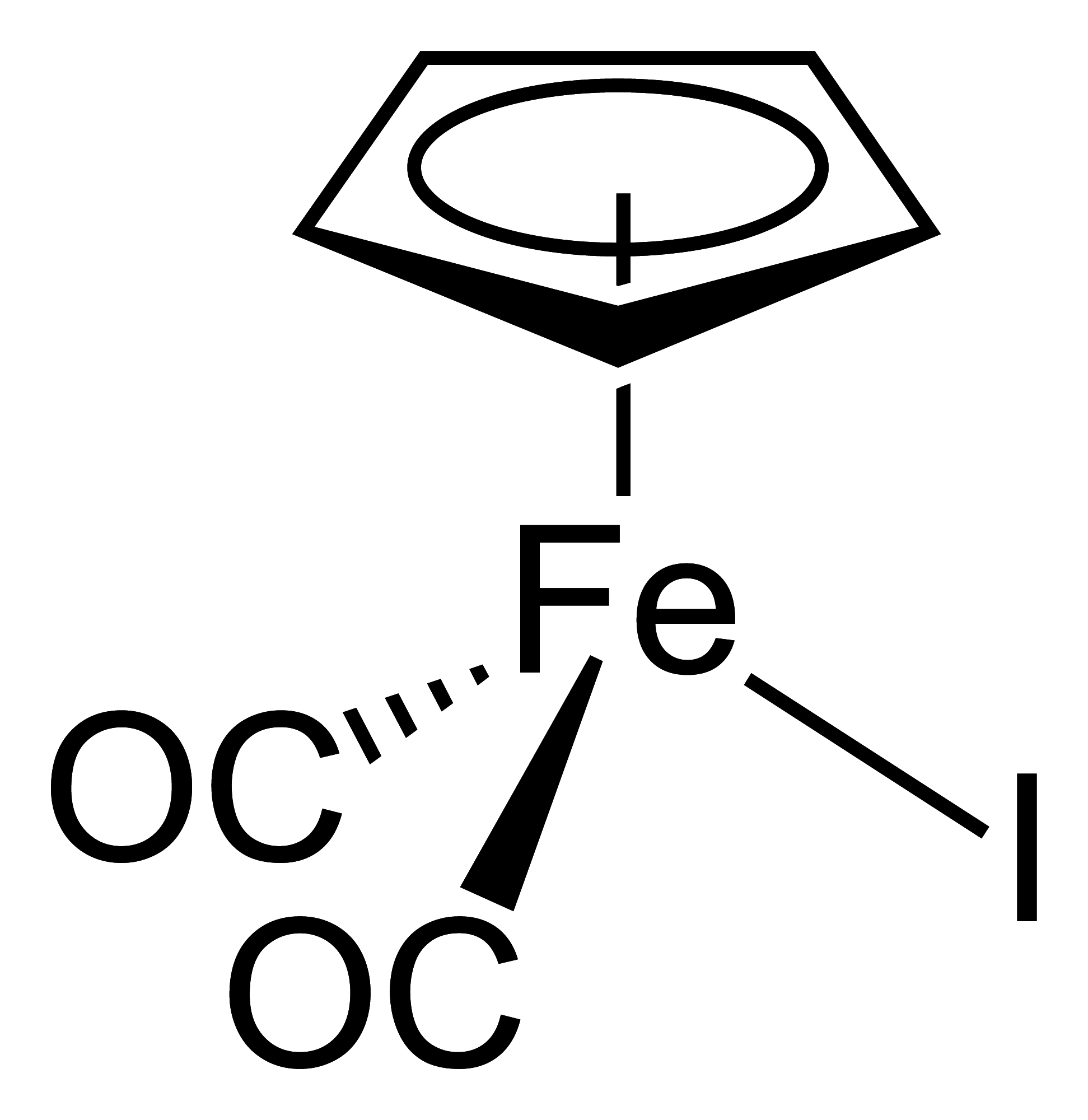

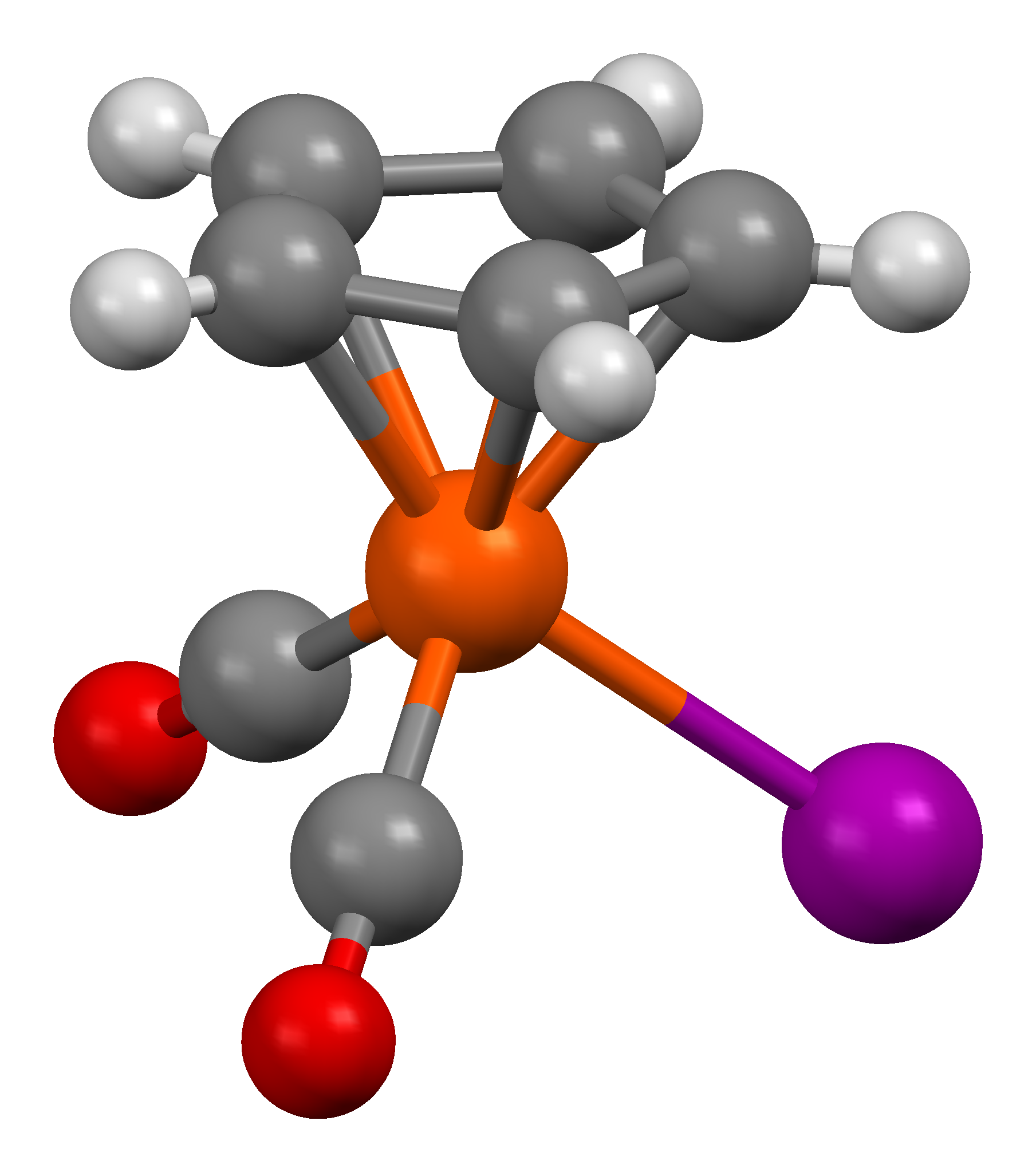

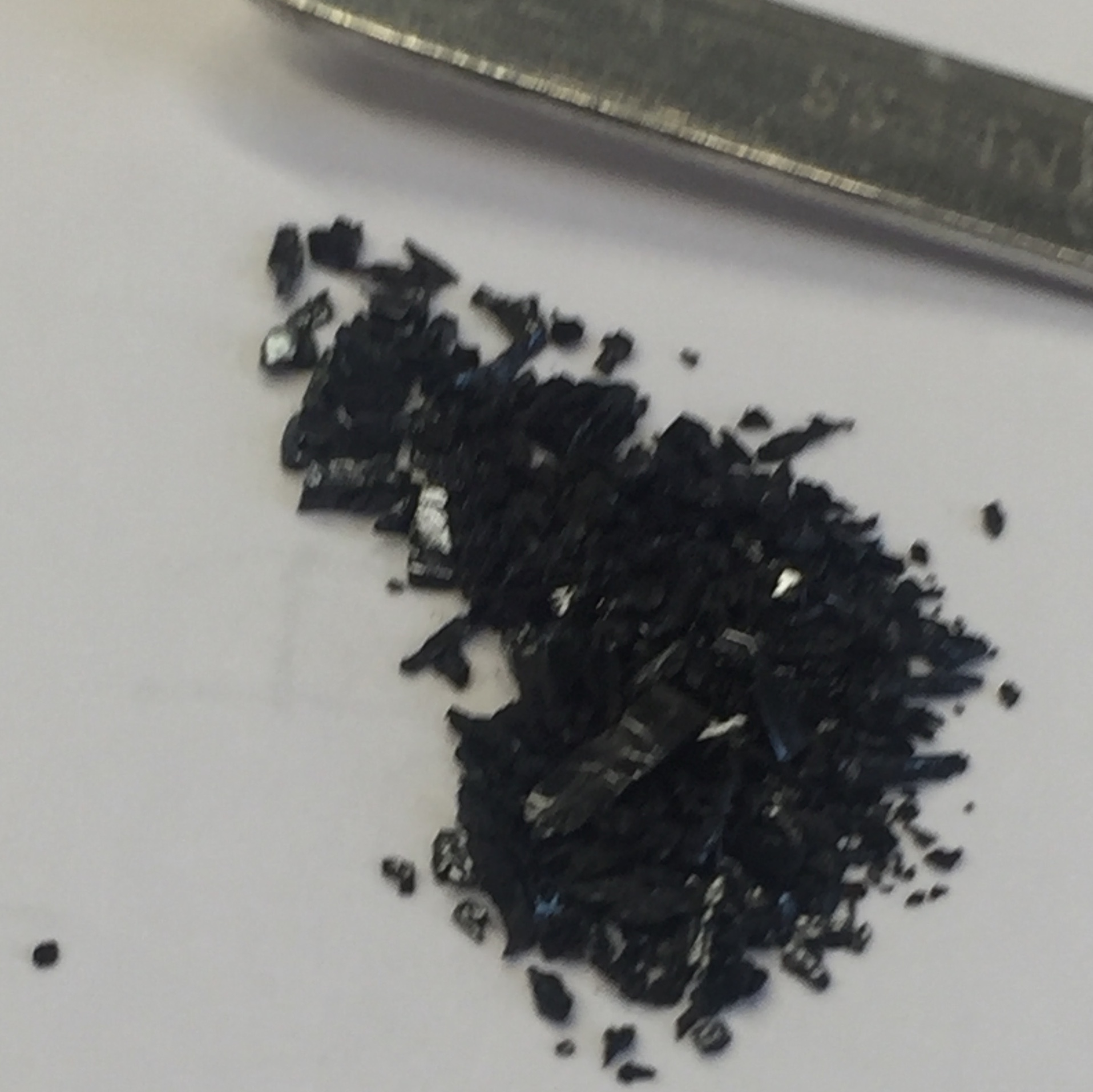

Identifiers
CAS Number	12078-28-3
3D model (JSmol)	Interactive image
ChemSpider	35466814
ECHA InfoCard	100.155.006
EC Number	626-622-8
PubChem CID	138114916
- InChI: InChI=1S/C5H5.2CO.Fe.HI/c1-2-4-5-3-1;2*1-2;;/h1-5H;;;;1H/p-1 Key: XPSYTVVYYIGNSG-UHFFFAOYSA-M
- SMILES: [C-]#[O+].[C-]#[O+].C1=C[CH]C=C1.[Fe].[I-]

Properties
Chemical formula	C_{7}H_{5}FeIO_{2}
Molar mass	303.864 g·mol^{−1}
Appearance	Black crystalline solid (density = 2.374 g/cm^{3})
Melting point	119 °C (246 °F; 392 K)

Structure
Space group	Cs

Hazards
- GHS labelling
Pictograms	(GHS07: Exclamation mark)
Signal word	Warning
Hazard statements	H302, H312, H332
Precautionary statements	P261, P264, P270, P271, P280, P301+P317, P302+P352, P304+P340, P317, P321, P330, P362+P364, P501
- Except where otherwise noted, data are given for materials in their standard state (at 25 °C [77 °F], 100 kPa). verify (what is ?) Infobox references

Cyclopentadienyliron dicarbonyl iodide is an organoiron compound with the formula (C_{5}H_{5})Fe(CO)_{2}I. It is a dark brown solid that is soluble in common organic solvents. (C_{5}H_{5})Fe(CO)_{2}I, or FpI as it is often known, is an intermediate for the preparation of other organoiron compounds such as in ferraboranes.

== Structure ==
The compound has C_{s} symmetry, with a mirror plane intersecting one carbon of the Cp ring as well as the iron and iodide centre. The compound adopts a piano stool structure: the cyclopentadienyl ligand is the "seat" and three other ligands are "legs". Such compounds are members of the half-sandwich family of compounds, which is a subgroup of the metallocenes. X-ray crystallography shows the following features: Fe-Cp centroid = 1.72, Fe-I = 2.61, and Fe-CO = 1.78 Å.

Electron counting of this iron(II) complex indicates that (C_{5}H_{5})Fe(CO)_{2}I is an 18-electron complex: using the neutral method there are 8 electrons from the iron, 5 electrons from the cyclopentadienyl anion, 2 electrons from each of the carbonyls, and 1 electron from the iodide.

== Preparation ==
Cyclopentadienyliron dicarbonyl iodide is synthesized by the reaction of cyclopentadienyliron dicarbonyl dimer with I_{2}:

Cp_{2}Fe_{2}(CO)_{4} + I_{2} → 2 CpFe(CO)_{2}I

It was first reported by Pauson and Hallam.
