= (Cyclooctatetraene)iron tricarbonyl =

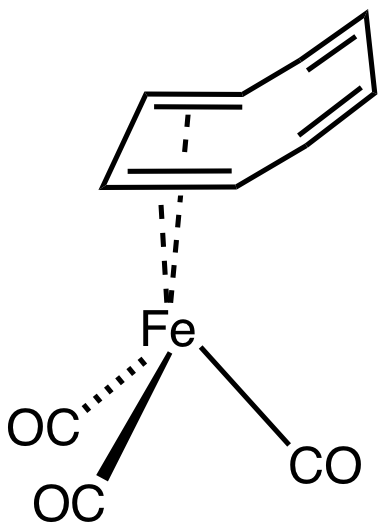

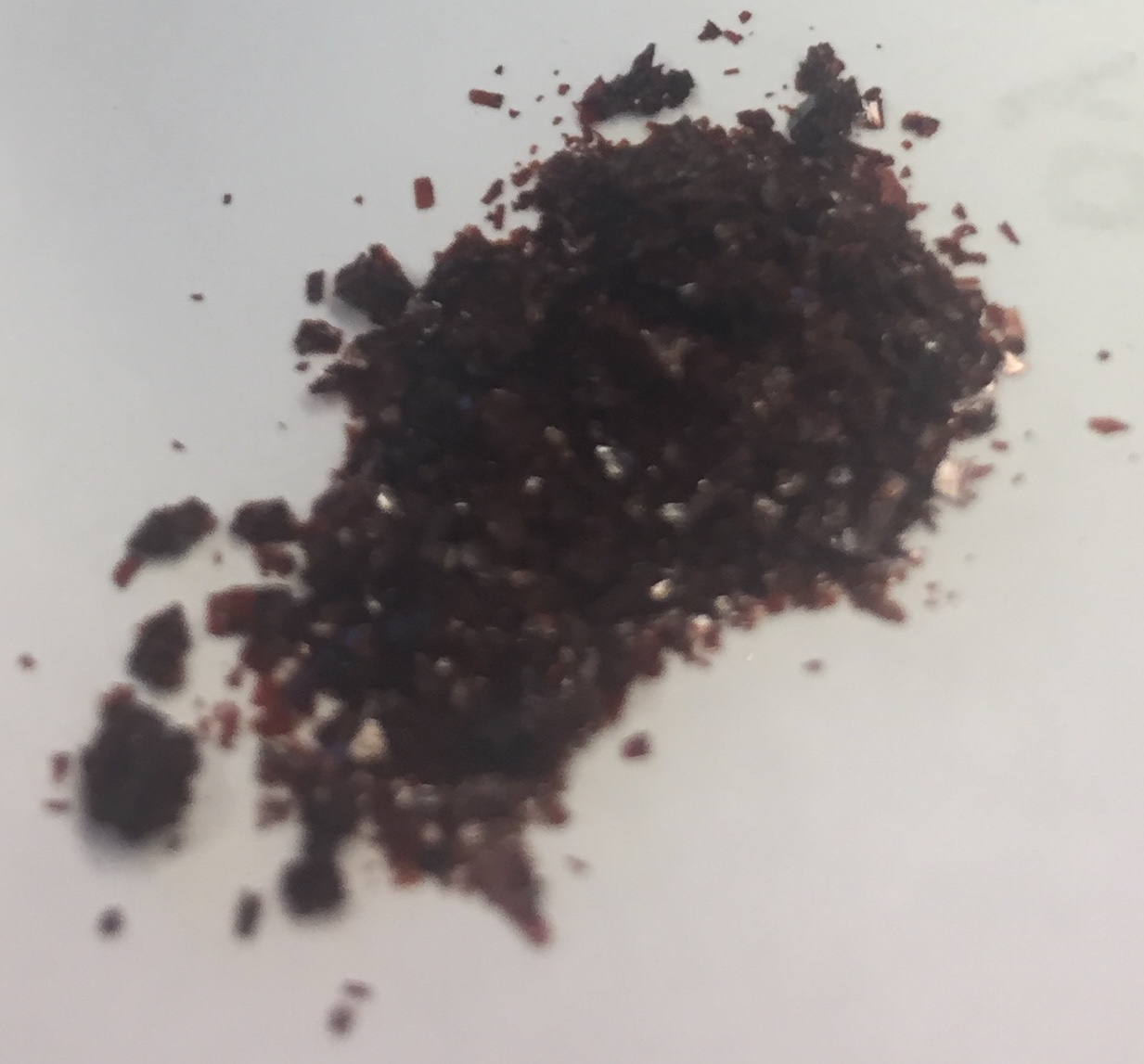

Names
- Other names Tricarbonyl(cyclooctatetraene)iron

Identifiers
| CAS Number | 12093-05-9 |
| 3D model (JSmol) | Interactive image |
| ChemSpider | 9611340 |
| ECHA InfoCard | 100.150.780 |
| EC Number | 621-975-4 |
| PubChem CID | 11436476 |
- InChI: InChI=1S/C8H8.3CO.Fe/c1-2-4-6-8-7-5-3-1;3*1-2;/h1-8H;;;;/b2-1-,3-1?,4-2?,5-3-,6-4-,7-5?,8-6?,8-7-;;;; Key: XAOCYVWRKJTXOL-JGZYGLCTSA-N
- SMILES: [C]=O.[C]=O.[C]=O.C\1=C\C=C/C=C\C=C1.[Fe]

Properties
| Chemical formula | C_{11}H_{8}FeO_{3} |
| Molar mass | 244.027 g·mol^{−1} |
| Appearance | orange solid |

Hazards
- GHS labelling
| Pictograms | (GHS07: Exclamation mark) |
| Signal word | Warning |
| Hazard statements | H302, H312, H332 |
| Precautionary statements | P261, P264, P270, P271, P280, P301+P312, P302+P352, P304+P312, P304+P340, P312, P322, P330, P363, P501 |

Related compounds
| Related compounds | Tris(cyclooctatetraene)triiron |
- Except where otherwise noted, data are given for materials in their standard state (at 25 °C [77 °F], 100 kPa). Infobox references

(Cyclooctatetraene)iron tricarbonyl is the organoiron compound with the formula (C_{8}H_{8})Fe(CO)_{3}. Like other examples of (diene)Fe(CO)_{3} complexes, it is an orange, diamagnetic solid. Although several isomers are possible, only the η^{4}-C_{8}H_{8} complex is observed. The complex is an example of a ring-whizzer, since, on the NMR time-scale, the Fe(CO)_{3} center migrates around the rim of the cyclooctatetraene ligand.
