= Disodium tetracarbonylferrate =

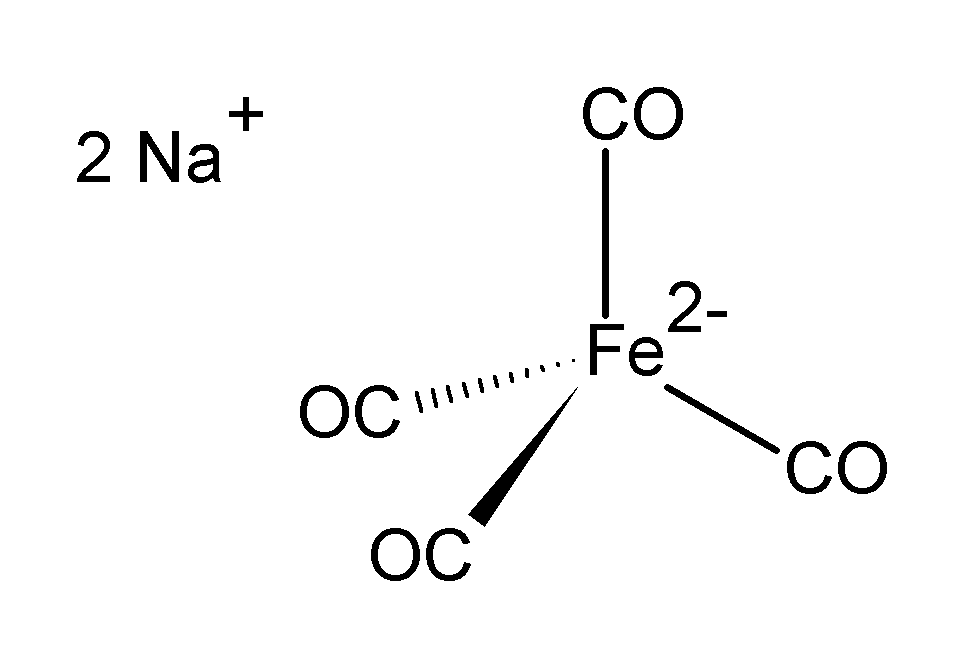

Names
- IUPAC name Disodium tetracarbonylferrate
- Other names: Disodium iron tetracarbonyl; Collman's reagent

Identifiers
| CAS Number | 14878-31-0 |
| 3D model (JSmol) | Interactive image |
| ECHA InfoCard | 100.035.395 |
| EC Number | 238-951-0 |
| PubChem CID | 73357794 |
- InChI: InChI=1S/4CHO.Fe.2Na/c4*1-2;;;/h4*1H;;;/q4*-1;+2;2*+1 Key: JSMIGIAJTPRDEQ-UHFFFAOYSA-N
- SMILES: [Na+].[Na+].[O+]#[C][Fe-6]([C]#[O+])([C]#[O+])[C]#[O+]

Properties
| Chemical formula | Na_{2}[Fe(CO)_{4}] |
| Molar mass | 213.865 g·mol^{−1} |
| Appearance | Colorless solid |
| Density | 2.16 g/cm^{3}, solid |
| Solubility in water | Decomposes |
| Solubility | tetrahydrofuran, dimethylformamide, dioxane |

Structure
| Crystal structure | Distorted tetrahedron |
| Coordination geometry | Tetrahedral |

Hazards
- Occupational safety and health (OHS/OSH)
| Main hazards | Pyrophoric |

Related compounds
| Related compounds | Iron pentacarbonyl |
- Except where otherwise noted, data are given for materials in their standard state (at 25 °C [77 °F], 100 kPa). verify (what is ?) Infobox references

Disodium tetracarbonylferrate is the organoiron compound with the formula Na_{2}[Fe(CO)_{4}]. It is always used as a solvate, e.g., with tetrahydrofuran or dimethoxyethane, which bind to the sodium cation. An oxygen-sensitive colourless solid, it is a reagent in organometallic and organic chemical research. The dioxane solvated sodium salt is known as Collman's reagent, in recognition of James P. Collman, an early popularizer of its use.

== Structure ==
The dianion [Fe(CO)_{4}]^{2−} is isoelectronic with Ni(CO)_{4}. The iron center is tetrahedral, with Na^{+}---OCFe interactions. It is commonly used with dioxane complexed to the sodium cation.

== Synthesis ==
The reagent was originally generated in situ by reducing iron pentacarbonyl with sodium amalgam. Modern synthesis use sodium naphthalene or sodium benzophenone ketyls as the reducants:

Fe(CO)_{5} + 2 Na → Na_{2}[Fe(CO)_{4}] + CO

When a deficiency of sodium is used, the reduction affords deep yellow octacarbonyl diferrate:

2 Fe(CO)_{5} + 2 Na → Na_{2}[Fe_{2}(CO)_{8}] + 2 CO

Some specialized methods do not start with iron carbonyl.

== Reactions ==
It is used to synthesise aldehydes from alkyl halides. The reagent was originally described for the conversion of primary alkyl bromides to the corresponding aldehydes in a two-step, "one-pot" reaction:

Na_{2}[Fe(CO)_{4}] + RBr → Na[RFe(CO)_{4}] + NaBr

This solution is then treated sequentially with PPh_{3} and then acetic acid to give the aldehyde, RCHO.

Disodium tetracarbonylferrate can be used to convert acyl chlorides to aldehydes. This reaction proceeds via the intermediacy of iron acyl complex.

Na_{2}[Fe(CO)_{4}] + RCOCl → Na[RC(O)Fe(CO)_{4}] + NaCl
Na[RC(O)Fe(CO)_{4}] + HCl → RCHO + "Fe(CO)_{4}" + NaCl

Disodium tetracarbonylferrate reacts with alkyl halides (RX) to produce alkyl complexes:

Na_{2}[Fe(CO)_{4}] + RX → Na[RFe(CO)_{4}] + NaX

Such iron alkyls can be converted to the corresponding carboxylic acid and acid halides:

Na[RFe(CO)_{4}] + O_{2}, H^{+} →→ RCO_{2}H + Fe...
Na[RFe(CO)_{4}] + 2 X_{2} → RC(O)X + FeX_{2} + 3 CO + NaX
