= Bis(cyclooctatetraene)iron =

Identifiers
| CAS Number | 12184-52-0 |
| 3D model (JSmol) | Interactive image |
| PubChem CID | 10923395 |
- InChI: InChI=1S/2C8H8.Fe/c2*1-2-4-6-8-7-5-3-1;/h2*1-8H;/b2*2-1-,3-1?,4-2?,5-3-,6-4-,7-5?,8-6?,8-7-; Key: MXSLSXKBFNCQNV-MZLYQNCSSA-N
- SMILES: C\1=C\C=C/C=C\C=C1.C\1=C\C=C/C=C\C=C1.[Fe]

Properties
| Chemical formula | C_{16}H_{16}Fe |
| Molar mass | 264.149 g·mol^{−1} |
| Density | 1.42 (from structure) |

Structure
| Crystal structure | Monoclinic |
| Space group | Cc or C2/c |
| Lattice constant | a = 15.13, b = 10.68, c = 13.98 α = 90°, β = 99.5°, γ = 90° |
| Formula units (Z) | 12 |

Related compounds
| Related compounds | Tris(cyclooctatetraene)triiron |
- Except where otherwise noted, data are given for materials in their standard state (at 25 °C [77 °F], 100 kPa). Infobox references

Bis(cyclooctatetraene)iron is an organoiron compound with the formula Fe(C_{8}H_{8})_{2}, abbreviated Fe(COT)_{2}. It is an air-sensitive black solid that is soluble in diethyl ether and aromatic solvents. The compound decomposes in solution after a few days even under inert atmosphere. It has no known practical applications but has been studied as a soluble source of Fe(0).

== Structure ==
According to analysis by single crystal X-ray crystallography, the two cyclooctatetraene rings bind differently to the Fe center, leading to the description Fe(η^{4}-C_{8}H_{8})(η^{6}-C_{8}H_{8}). One cyclooctatetraene ring binds to Fe with two adjacent double bonds. This interaction is similar to that in (η^{4}-C_{8}H_{8})Fe(CO)_{3}. The two planar groups formed by carbon atoms 1,2,7,8 and carbon atoms 3,4,5,6,7 form a dihedral angle of 33°. The second cyclooctatetraene ring binds through three double bonds. The shape and coordination of the lower ring is similar to that in (η^{6}-C_{8}H_{8})Mo(CO)_{3}. The non-coordinated double bond has a similar bond length as an ordinary double bond.

In solution, Fe(C_{8}H_{8})_{2} is a fluxional molecule such that its ^{1}H NMR spectrum consists of a singlet at room-temperature.

== Preparation ==
The laboratory synthesis of Fe(COT)_{2}, using Schlenk techniques, involves reduction of ferric acetylacetonate by triethylaluminium in the presence of 1,3,5,7-cyclooctatetraene:

Fe(C_{5}H_{7}O_{2})_{3} + 2 C_{8}H_{8} + 3 Al(C_{2}H_{5})_{3} → Fe(C_{8}H_{8})_{2} + 3 Al(C_{2}H_{5})_{2}(C_{5}H_{7}O_{2}) + 3/2 C_{2}H_{4} + 3/2 C_{2}H_{6}
