= Tris(cyclooctatetraene)triiron =

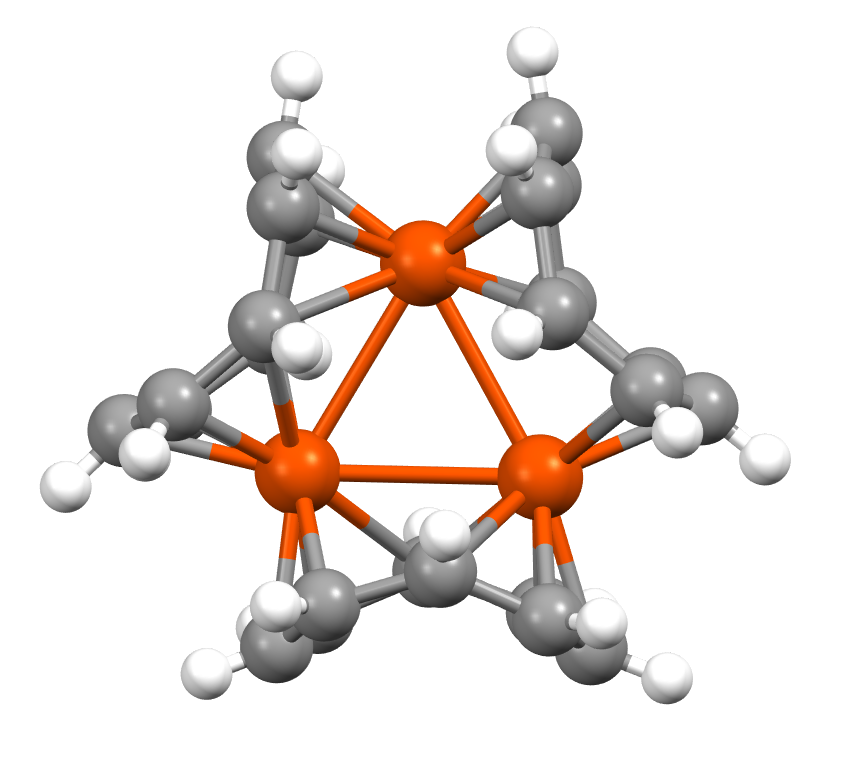

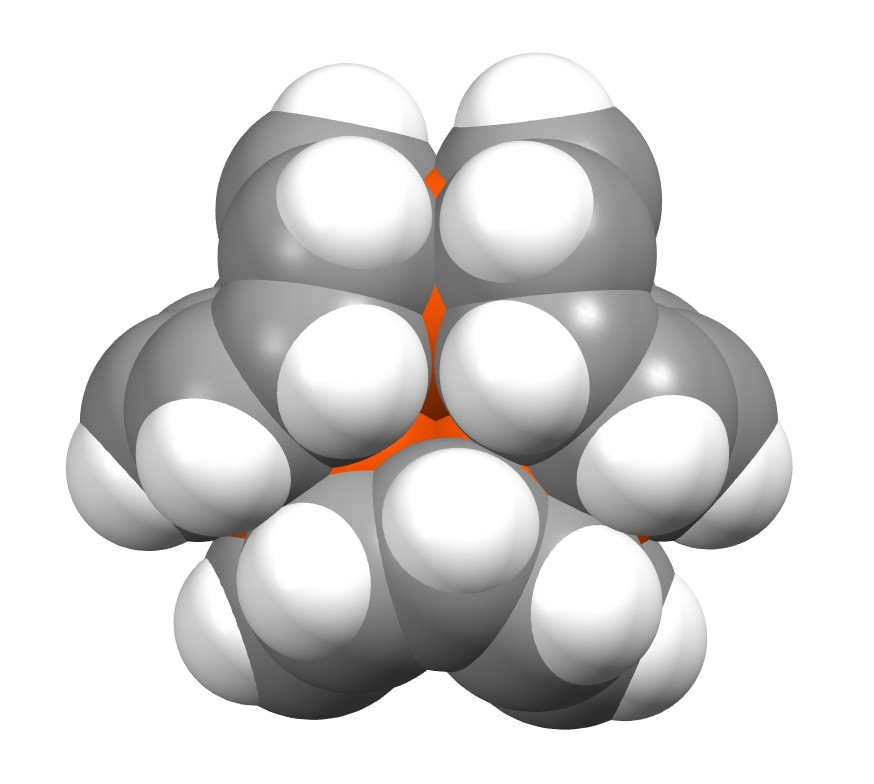

Names
- Other names tris(μ_{2}-η^{5},η^{3}-cyclo-octatetraene)-tri-iron

Identifiers
CAS Number	1201399-90-7
3D model (JSmol)	Interactive image
- InChI: InChI=1S/3C8H8.3Fe/c3*1-2-4-6-8-7-5-3-1;;;/h3*1-8H;;;/b3*2-1-,3-1-,4-2-,5-3-,6-4-,7-5-,8-6-,8-7-;;; Key: NPBKKAOUFKDAOG-RKOWHLECSA-N
- SMILES: C\1=C\C=C/C=C\C=C1.C\1=C\C=C/C=C\C=C1.C\1=C\C=C/C=C\C=C1.[Fe]2[Fe][Fe]2

Properties
Chemical formula	C_{24}H_{24}Fe_{3}
Molar mass	479.991 g·mol^{−1}
Appearance	black rhomboidal crystals
Density	1.87 (from structure)
Solubility in water	reacts
Solubility in other solvents	insoluble: benzene, toluene, pentane

Structure
Crystal structure	Monoclinic
Space group	P 2_{1}/n

Related compounds
Related compounds	Bis(cyclooctatetraene)iron; (Cyclooctatetraene)iron tricarbonyl
- Except where otherwise noted, data are given for materials in their standard state (at 25 °C [77 °F], 100 kPa). Infobox references

Tris(cyclooctatetraene)triiron or Fe_{3}(COT)_{3}, also referred to as the Lavallo-Grubbs compound (after its discoverers) is an organoiron compound with the formula Fe_{3}(C_{8}H_{8})_{3}. It is a pyrophoric, black crystalline solid, which is insoluble in common organic solvents. The compound represents a rare example of a hydrocarbon analogue of the well-known triiron dodecacarbonyl (Fe_{3}(CO)_{12}), originally prepared by Dewar and Jones in the early 20th century.

== Preparation ==
Lavello and Grubbs discovered the compound unexpectedly when trying to prepare noncarbonyl, low coordinate, Fe(0) complexes of N-heterocyclic carbenes (NHCs). They found that reactions of Fe(COT)_{2} and the NHC, 1,3-bis(2,4,6-trimethylphenyl)-4,5-dihydroimidazol-2-ylidene (SIMes), produced tetrametallic, Fe(I)-Fe(0) mixed valent NHC-COT complexes. In an attempt to characterize intermediates of the unusual transformation, they employed the more sterically hindered NHC, 1,3-bis(2,6-diisopropylphenyl)-4,5-dihydroimidazol-2-ylidene (SIPr) (with Dipp substituents).

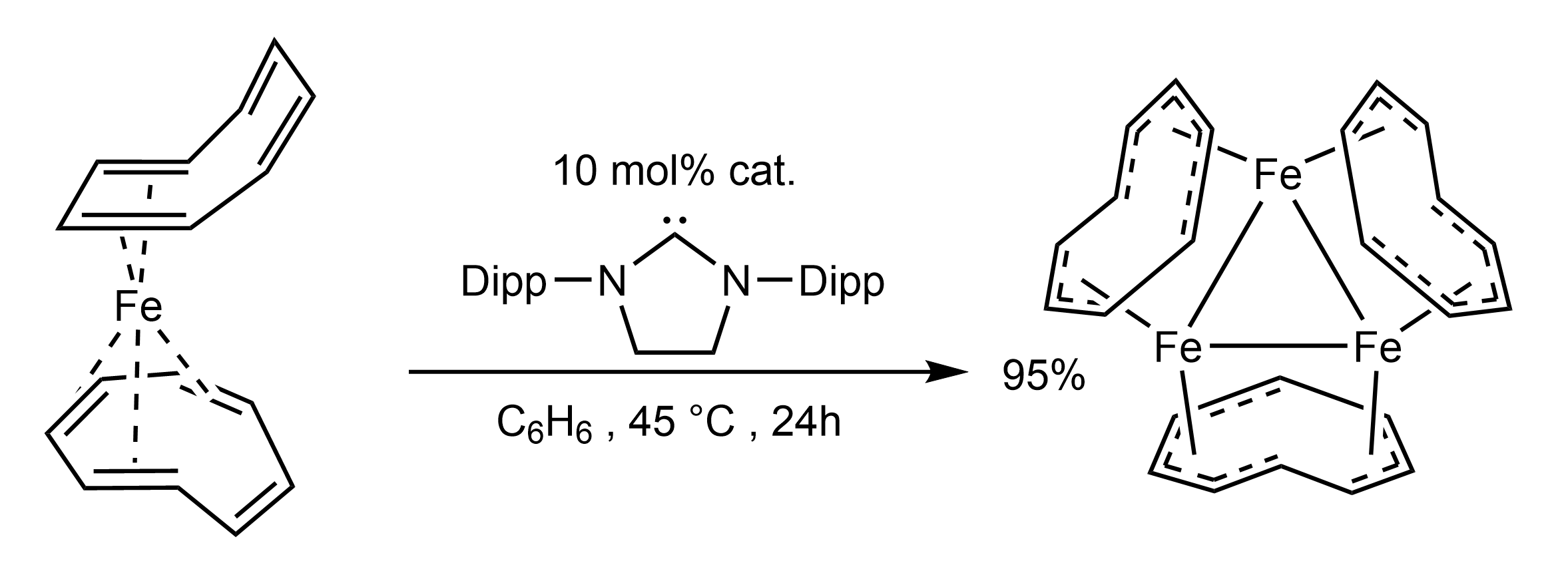
Tris(cyclooctatetraene)triiron preparation from bis(cyclooctatetraene)iron mediated by catalytic amounts of NHC. (Dipp = 2,6-diisopropylphenyl)

In benzene, the Dipp substituted NHC reacts with Fe(COT)_{2} to produce large black rhomboidal crystals of tris(cyclooctatetraene)triiron over 24 h at room temperature. Notably, the reaction was found to occur with catalytic amounts of NHC (10 mol%) yielding 67% of Fe_{3}(COT)_{3} after 24 h (turn over number=9.5). The synthesis is optimized when the reaction is conducted at 45 °C, yielding 95% conversion to the tris(cyclooctatetraene)triiron cluster. They also highlighted that heating Fe(COT)_{2} in benzene without any NHC to 100 °C for 24 h forms trace amounts of Fe_{3}(COT)_{3}, but also large amounts of iron metal. Unsurprisingly, elemental analysis of the cluster affirms a 1:1 Fe:COT ratio.

The formation of Fe_{3}(COT)_{3} from Fe(COT)_{2} has been calculated to be slightly exothermic(15 kcal/mol).

Other NHCs lead to other unique mixed NHC-COT low valent iron complexes. Lavallo and Grubbs rationalize the transformation by emphasizing the capacity of NHCs to catalytically induce the formation of metal-metal bonds, where the steric hindrance of the NHC is essential, in particular, for the lability of the NHC (in coordination and dissociation) in the cycle. The bulky NHC is proposed to prevent reduction of COT by a bimetallic [(L)Fe_{2}(COT)_{2}] intermediate, where steric constraints block the bonding hapticity required to ligate a reduced form of COT. Another possibility put forward is that reduction of COT occurs only following coordination by a second carbene in the case of SIMes during the catalytic cycle. The sterically hindered NHC prevents such a transformation from occurring.

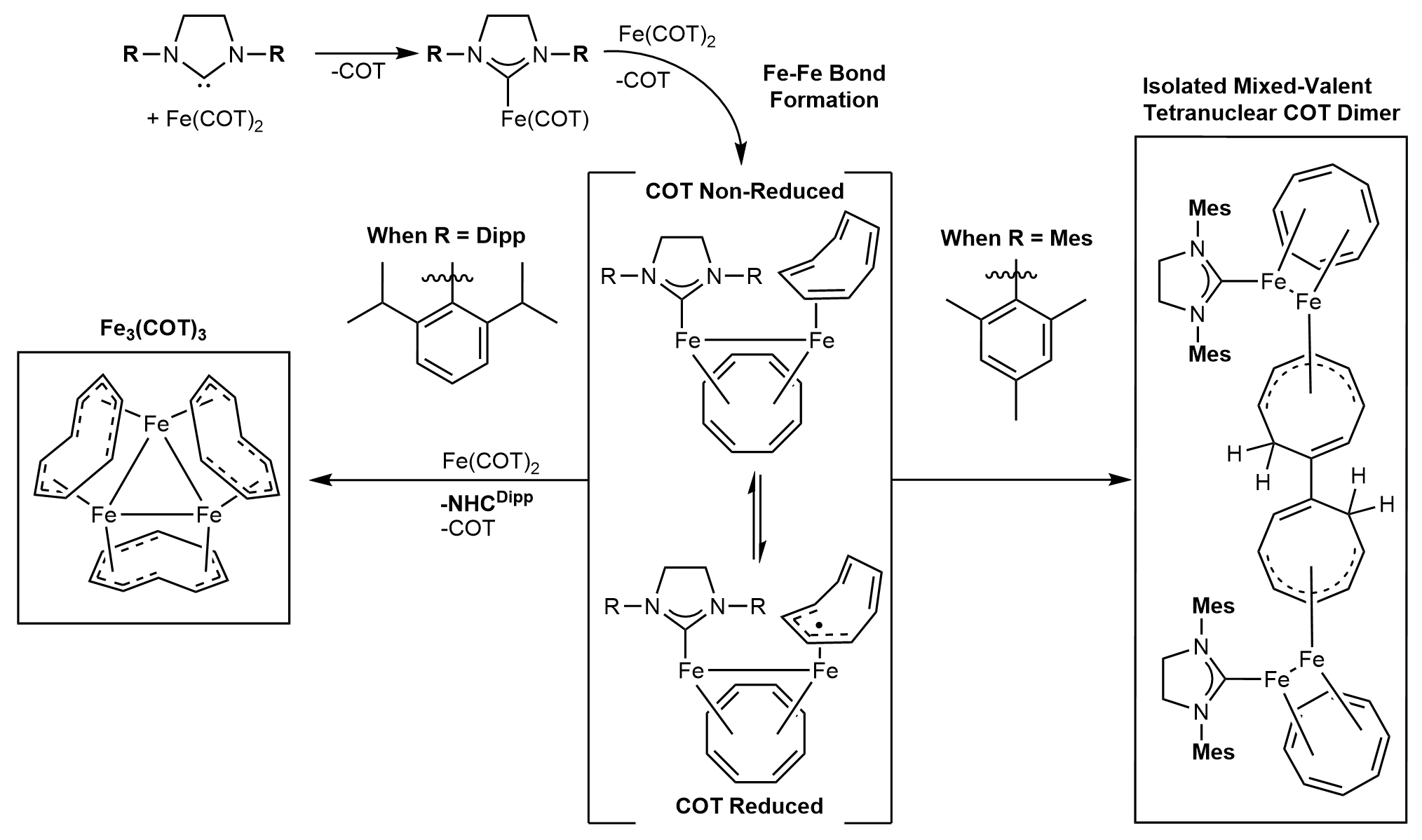
Proposed intermediates by Lavallo and Grubbs in the formation of Fe_{3}(C_{8}H_{8})_{3} and alternative product with changes in NHC-substituents.

== Electronic structure and bonding ==
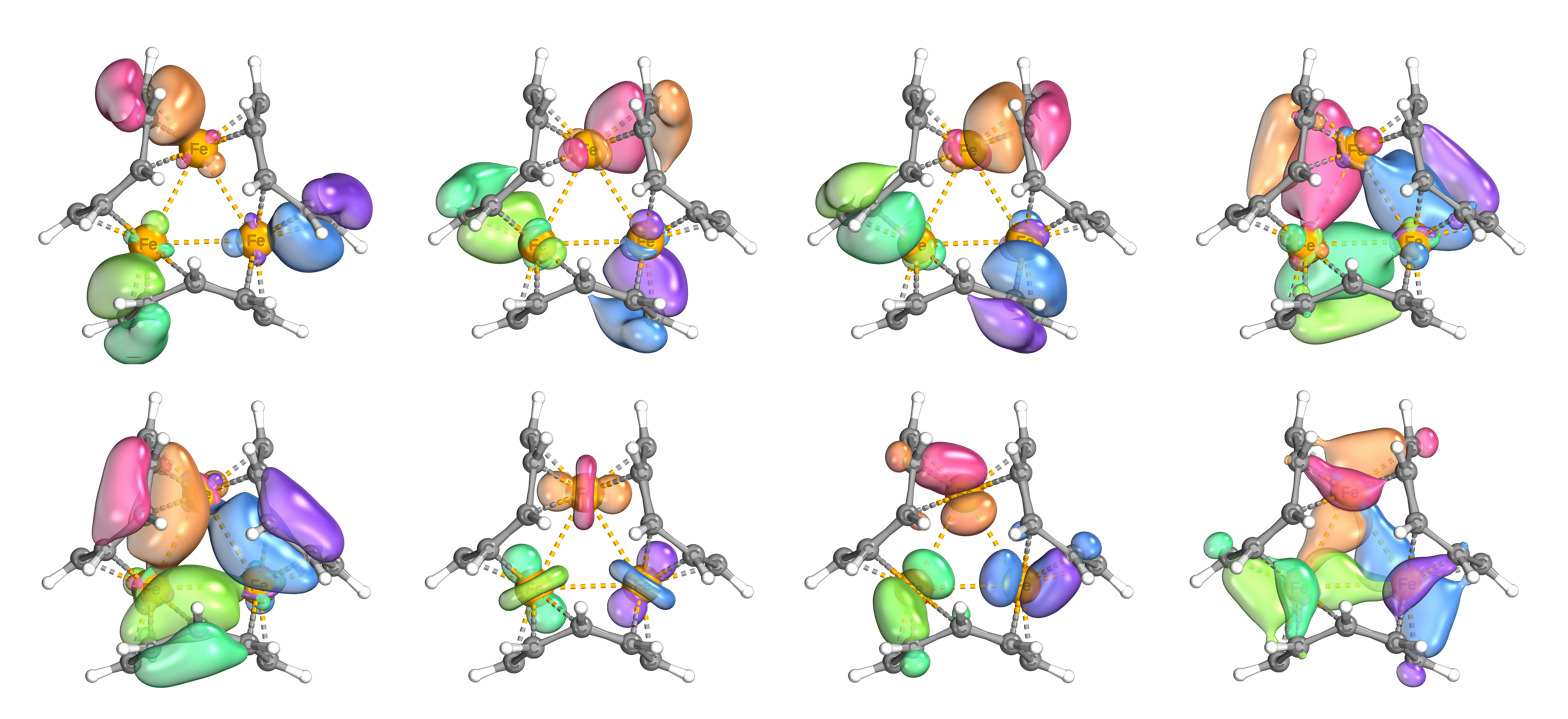
Example of intrinsic bonding orbitals from optimized singlet geometry of Fe_{3}(COT)_{3} ; BP86/DZP/TZP(Fe).

The discoverers were reluctant to assert an oxidation state of the iron centers in the compound, instead deferring the details of the electronic structure to computational studies.

The crystal structure reveals that the three iron centers arrange in an equilateral triangle (nearly ideal; Fe1 = 59.67°, Fe2 = 60.15°, and Fe3 = 60.18°) The corresponding bond lengths are similar to one another, (Fe1–Fe2 = 2.829 Å, Fe1–Fe3 = 2.815 Å, and Fe2–Fe3 = 2.830 Å), and reflective of Fe-Fe single bonds. As a trinuclear cluster, it would be thought to have a stable 48-electron closed-shell configuration (24 electrons from the three iron atoms and 24 electrons from the three COT rings).

In the original depiction, each COT ligand acts as an η^{3} and η^{5} donor, and thus, some degree of π-allylic and pentadienyl bonding modes can be inferred – though the degree of metal-to-ligand electron transfer is uncertain. Computational models suggest the binding mode to lie between η^{3} and η^{5}, as small shifts in geometry make each mode effectively equivalent (see section on fluxional behavior). Furthermore, DFT calculations with the BLYP functional using a TZP basis set for iron and DZP for carbon and hydrogen estimate a Hirshfeld charge of 0.08 on the iron centers (and Voronoi deformation density of 0.00). Interestingly, all of the bond orders of the C-C ring lie between 1.26 and 1.33, sharply contrasting the discrete single and double bonds of free cyclooctatetraene, or COT complexes with non-bound olefins.

Doubly reduced COT (dianion) is known to adopt a planar (aromatic) conformation to metal centers, which is not observed in Fe_{3}(COT)_{3}. However, arguments also exist that such conformations are more related to binding efficiency than aromaticity.

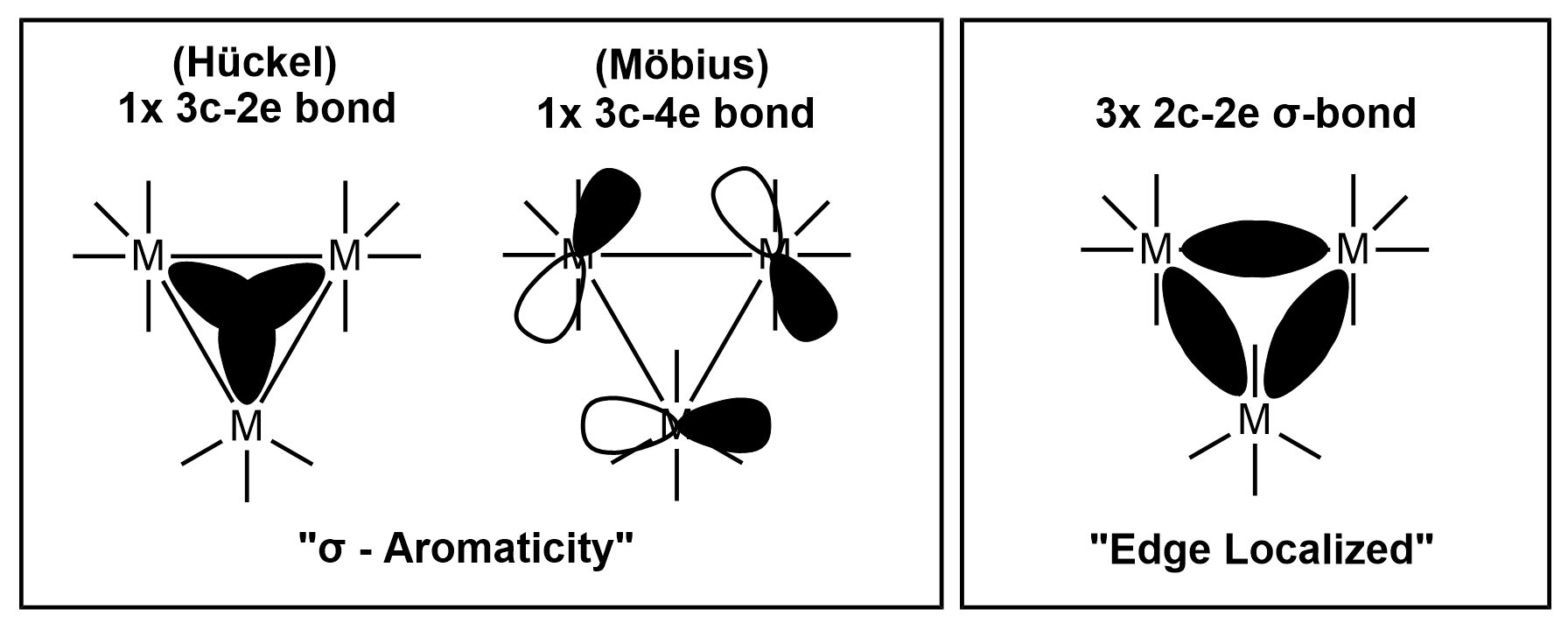
Comparison to Fe-Fe bonding theories of Fe3(CO)_{12} as in Shaefer's depictions.

In computational studies (BP86), when Fe_{3}(C_{8}H_{8})_{3} is optimized as a singlet (gas phase), the iron centers are arranged in an ideal equilateral triangle, as experimentally observed in the crystal structure. In such an electronic configuration, each iron atom achieves an 18-electron configuration through pseudo η^{5} and η^{3} coordination to alternating COT ligands. However, if the compound is optimized as a triplet structure, the iron centers instead are a scalene triangle, featuring significant Jahn-Teller distortions.

Additional NBO analysis of the singlet structure reveals Wiberg Bond Indices of 0.22 for the Fe-Fe bonds, closely reminiscent of that of D_{3h} Fe_{3}(CO)_{12} (0.18).

== Fluxional behavior ==
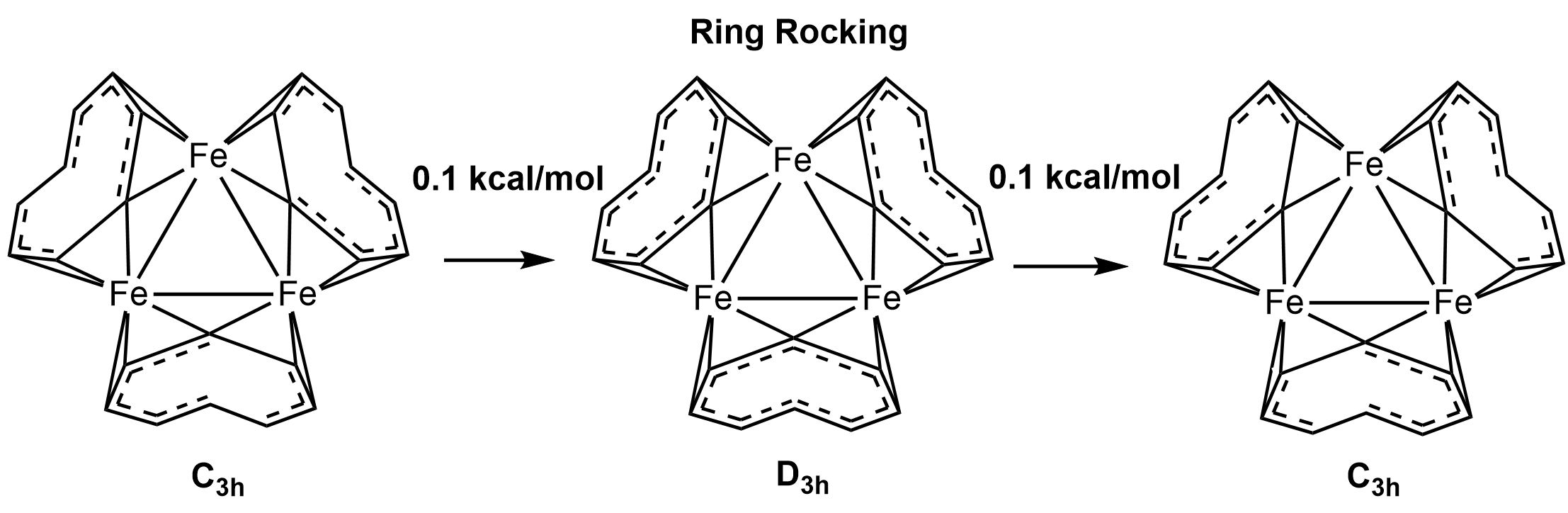
Fluxional Ring rocking in Fe_{3}(COT)_{3} depicted by DeKock et al.

The V conformation of COT has an angle at 135° and is thought to be highly stabilized via bonding with the iron atoms (in free COT, this conformation is disfavored by approximately 36 kcal/mol).

Fascinatingly, in benzene solution, ^{1}H NMR reveals a single broadened resonance with a chemical shift at -3.15 ppm. This suggests that the cyclooctatetraene ligands are highly fluxional and some degree of paramagnetism.

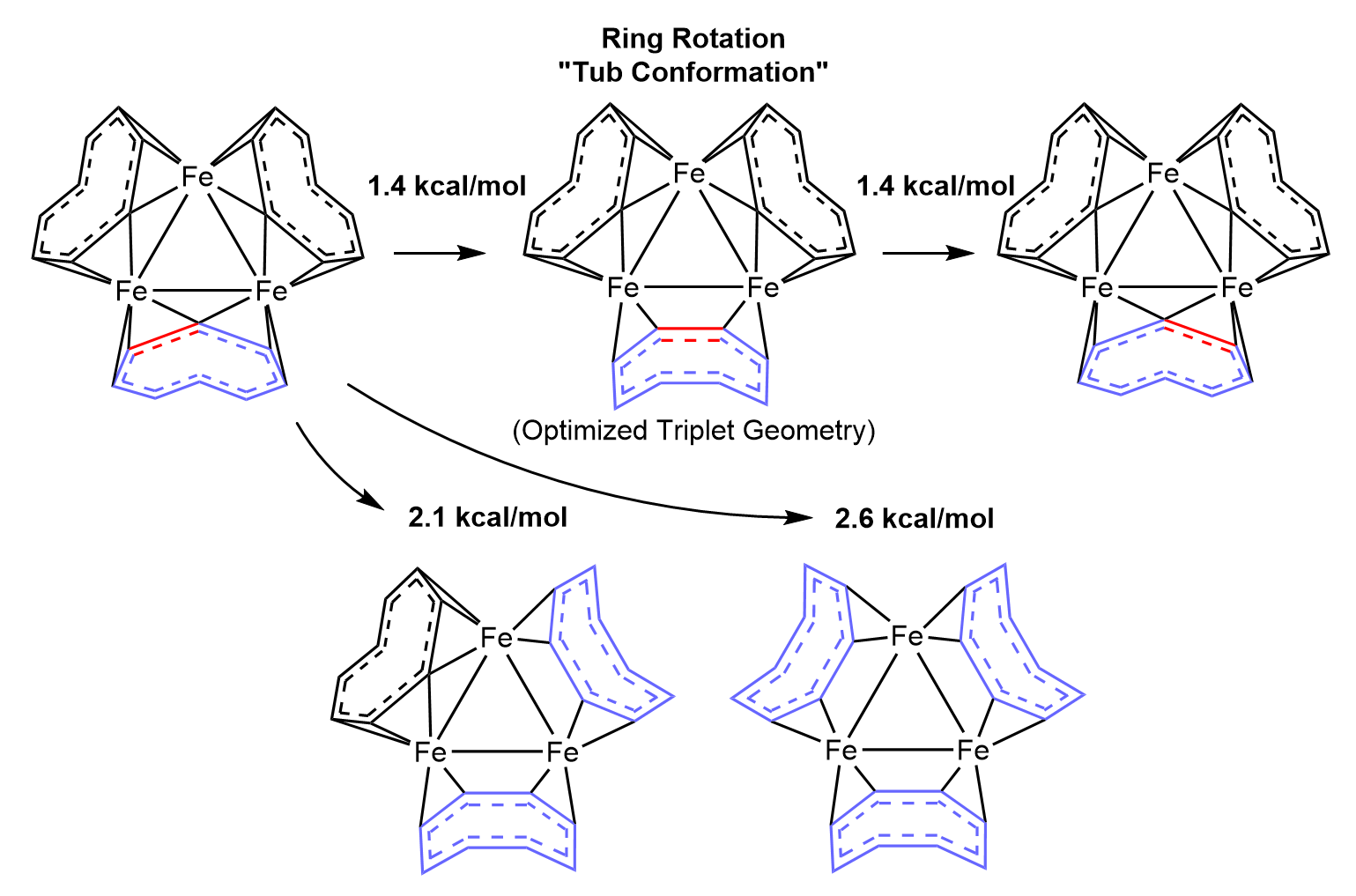
Fluxional Ring rotation in Fe_{3}(COT)_{3} depicted by DeKock et al.

COT is known to be a highly fluxional ligand in other compounds too, such compounds being deemed “ring-whizzers” (like the related (cyclooctatetraene)iron tricarbonyl).

The conformational fluxionality is supported by computational studies which show very low barriers to COT rotation (on the scale of 1.4 kcal/mol) and rocking (0.1 kcal/mol). The transformation from the C_{3h} singlet conformation to the triplet C_{2v} conformation have been calculated to be nearly isoenergetic, driving the possibility of the singlet state existing in equilibrium with the triplet state- an explanation for the observation of paramagnetic NMR resonances at ambient temperatures.

== Reactivity and Applications ==
The compound is highly reactive and pyrophoric, self-igniting in air. The lack of reactivity studies may be in part sourced from its very low solubility in organic solvents. However, it may be able to find use as a specialized source of reactive low-valent iron.

Computational studies have estimated COT dissociation from Fe_{3}(COT)_{3} to be 57 kcal/mol uphill, which would not be readily accessible at room temperature in solution.

With analogy to Fe_{3}(CO)_{12}, the compound could potentially be susceptible to Fe-Fe bond homolysis via photoexcitation.

== Analogies to Related Compounds ==
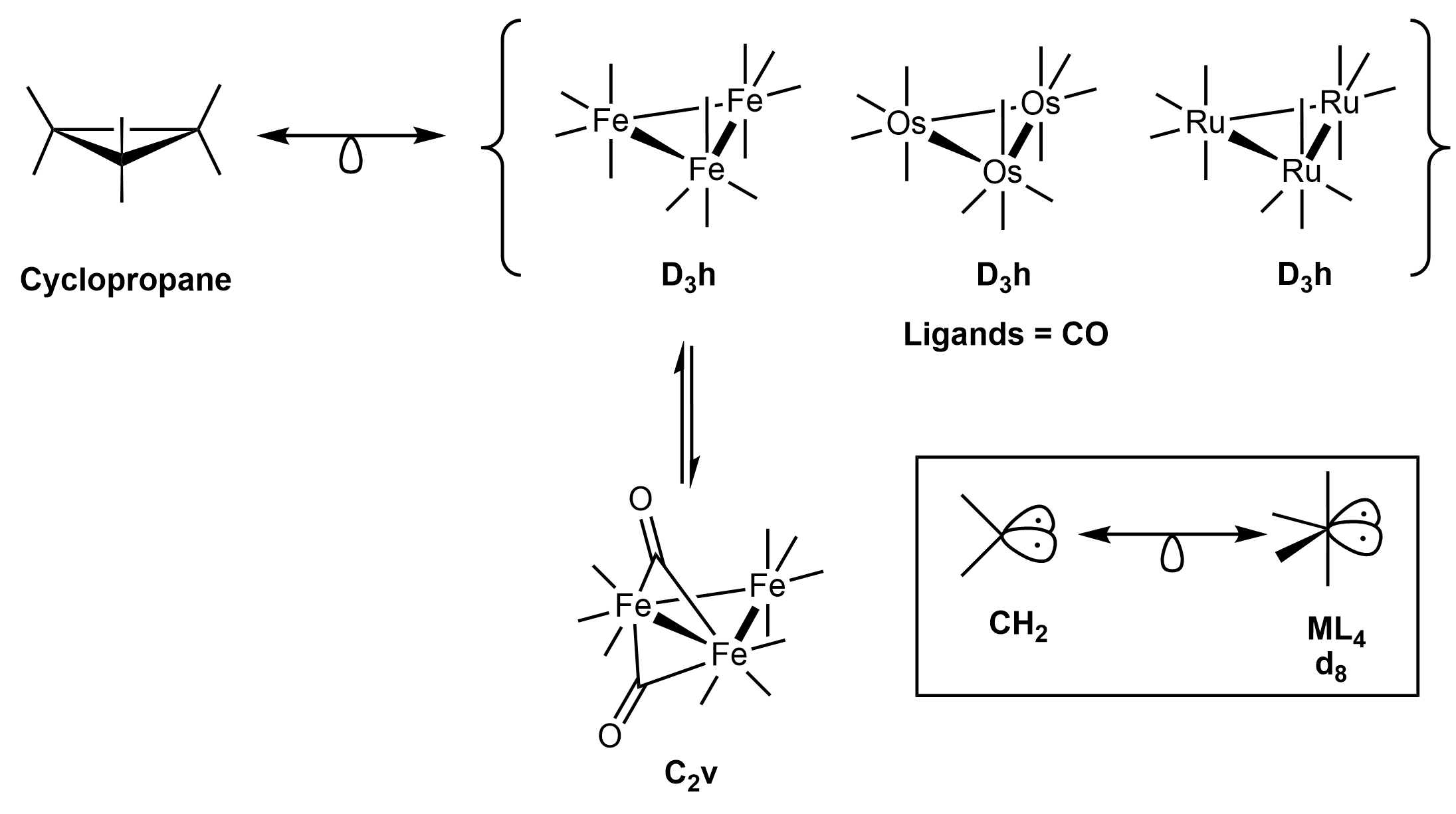

At the time of discovery, it was the only homoleptic trimetallic non-carbonyl cluster featuring hydrocarbon ligands. An isolobal analogy can be made with the related Fe_{3}(CO)_{10} (μ-CO)_{2} cluster first prepared by Jones and Dewar.

Alternatively, the compound could be compared to ferrocene. In this interpretation, each iron fragment bears an η^{3} allyl and η^{5} pentadienyl ligand as depicted. Under Green and Parkin's covalent bond classification method, this would yield LX and L_{2}X respectively. Then additionally, the iron centers donate a pair of electrons into an adjacent empty iron orbital as an adduct (donor-acceptor pairs L and Z type), to overall yield ML_{3}X_{4} (18 electrons). In fact, the bond orders in ferrocene and Fe3(COT)3 are reported to be very similar.

In fact, Fe_{3}(CO)_{12} and the group 5 analogues, Ru_{3}(CO)_{12} and Os_{3}(CO)_{12} are also known to feature highly fluxional CO ligands in solution (and even in the solid state).

Hypoelectronic derivatives (M=Ti, Cr, V, Mn) of Fe_{3}(C_{8}H_{8})_{3} would be predicted to have metal multiple bonds. Some somewhat related compounds, notably, Ti_{2}(C_{8}H_{8})_{3} and Cr_{2}(C_{8}H_{8})_{3} have been experimentally isolated.
