= Cyclopentadienyliron dicarbonyl dimer =

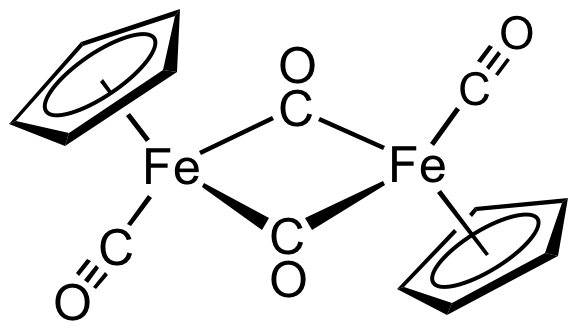

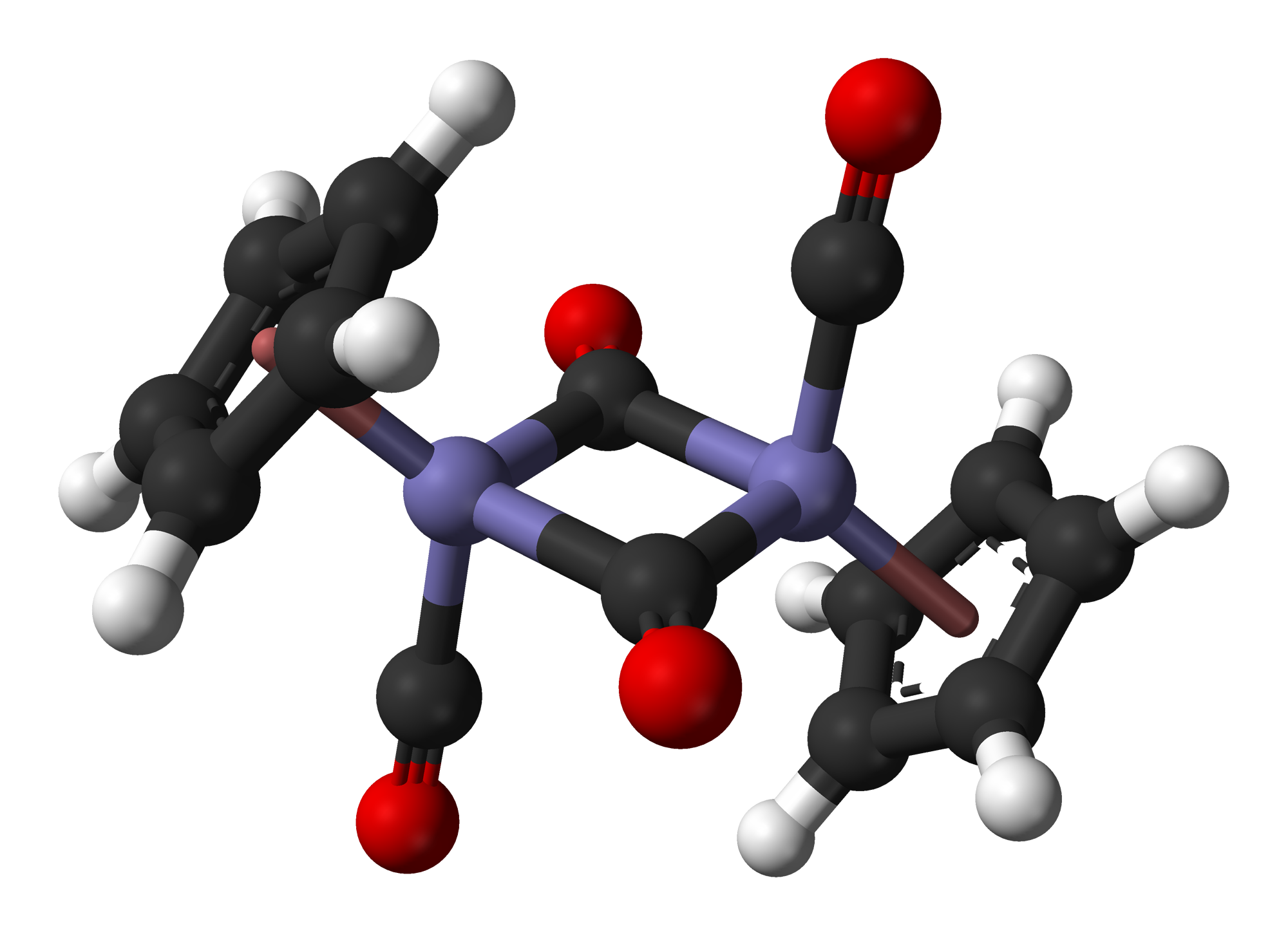

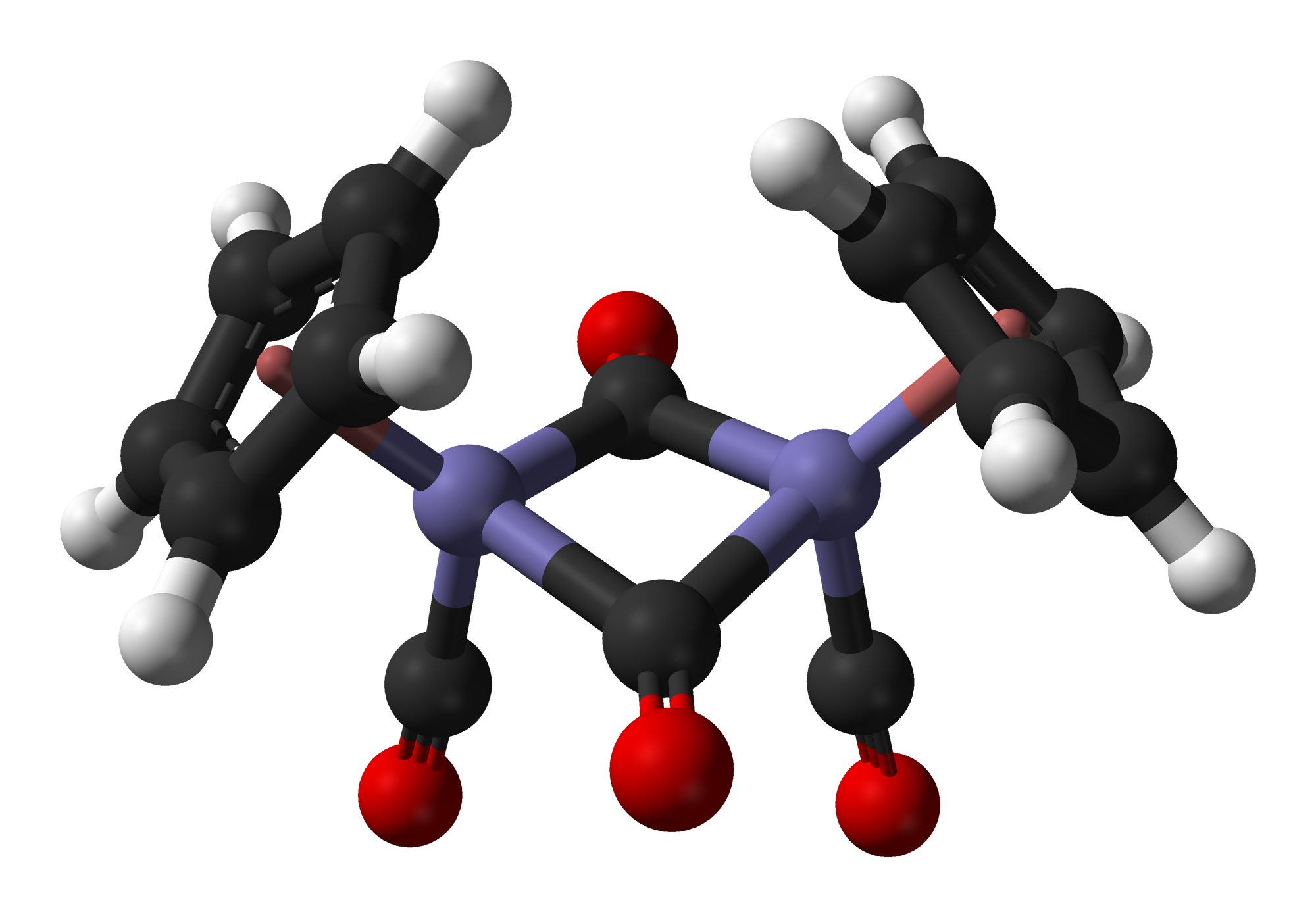

Names
- IUPAC name Di-μ-carbonyldicarbonylbis(η^{5}-cyclopenta-2,4-dien-1-yl)diiron
- Other names Bis(cyclopentadienyl)tetracarbonyl-diiron, Di(cyclopentadienyl)tetracarbonyl-diiron, Bis(dicarbonylcyclopentadienyliron)

Identifiers
CAS Number	12154-95-9
3D model (JSmol)	Interactive image
ChemSpider	24589716
ECHA InfoCard	100.032.057
EC Number	235-276-3
PubChem CID	11110989
- InChI: InChI=1S/2C5H5.4CO.2Fe/c2*1-2-4-5-3-1;4*1-2;;/h2*1-5H;;;;;;/q;;;;2*-1;2*+1 Key: XJSJEKXJJGHIGW-UHFFFAOYSA-N; InChI=1/2C5H5.4CO.2Fe/c2*1-2-4-5-3-1;4*1-2;;/h2*1-5H;;;;;;/q;;;;2*-1;2*+1/r2C6H5FeO.2CO/c2*8-5-7-6-3-1-2-4-6;2*1-2/h2*1-4,6H;; Key: XJSJEKXJJGHIGW-FEMRPSMKAV
- SMILES: c1ccc[cH-]1.[Fe]1(C#[O+])C(=O)[Fe](C#[O+])C(=O)1.c1ccc[cH-]1

Properties
Chemical formula	C_{14}H_{10}Fe_{2}O_{4}
Molar mass	353.925 g/mol
Appearance	Dark purple crystals
Density	1.77 g/cm^{3}, solid
Melting point	194 °C (381 °F; 467 K)
Boiling point	decomposition
Solubility in water	insoluble
Solubility in other solvents	benzene, THF, chlorocarbons

Structure
Coordination geometry	distorted octahedral
Dipole moment	3.1 D (benzene solution)

Hazards
- Occupational safety and health (OHS/OSH)
Main hazards	CO source
- GHS labelling
Pictograms	(GHS02: Flammable) (GHS06: Toxic) (GHS07: Exclamation mark)
Signal word	Danger
Hazard statements	H228, H302, H330, H331

Related compounds
Related compounds	Fe(C_{5}H_{5})_{2} Fe(CO)_{5}
- Except where otherwise noted, data are given for materials in their standard state (at 25 °C [77 °F], 100 kPa). verify (what is ?) Infobox references

Cyclopentadienyliron dicarbonyl dimer is an organometallic compound with the formula [(η^{5}-C_{5}H_{5})Fe(CO)_{2}]_{2}, often abbreviated to Cp_{2}Fe_{2}(CO)_{4}, [CpFe(CO)_{2}]_{2} or even Fp_{2}, with the colloquial name "fip dimer". It is a dark reddish-purple crystalline solid, which is readily soluble in moderately polar organic solvents such as chloroform and pyridine, but less soluble in carbon tetrachloride and carbon disulfide. Cp_{2}Fe_{2}(CO)_{4} is insoluble in but stable toward water. Cp_{2}Fe_{2}(CO)_{4} is reasonably stable to storage under air and serves as a convenient starting material for accessing other Fp (CpFe(CO)_{2}) derivatives.

== Structure ==
In solution, Cp_{2}Fe_{2}(CO)_{4} can be considered a dimeric half-sandwich complex. It exists in three isomeric forms: cis, trans, and an unbridged, open form. These isomers are distinguished by the position of the ligands. The cis and trans isomers differ in the relative position of C_{5}H_{5} (Cp) ligands. The cis and trans isomers have the formulation [(η^{5}-C_{5}H_{5})Fe(CO)(μ-CO)]_{2}, that is, two CO ligands are terminal whereas the other two CO ligands bridge between the iron atoms. The cis and trans isomers interconvert via the open isomer, which has no bridging ligands between iron atoms. Instead, it is formulated as (η^{5}-C_{5}H_{5})(OC)_{2}Fe−Fe(CO)_{2}(η^{5}-C_{5}H_{5}) — the metals are held together by an iron–iron bond. At equilibrium, the cis and trans isomers are predominant.

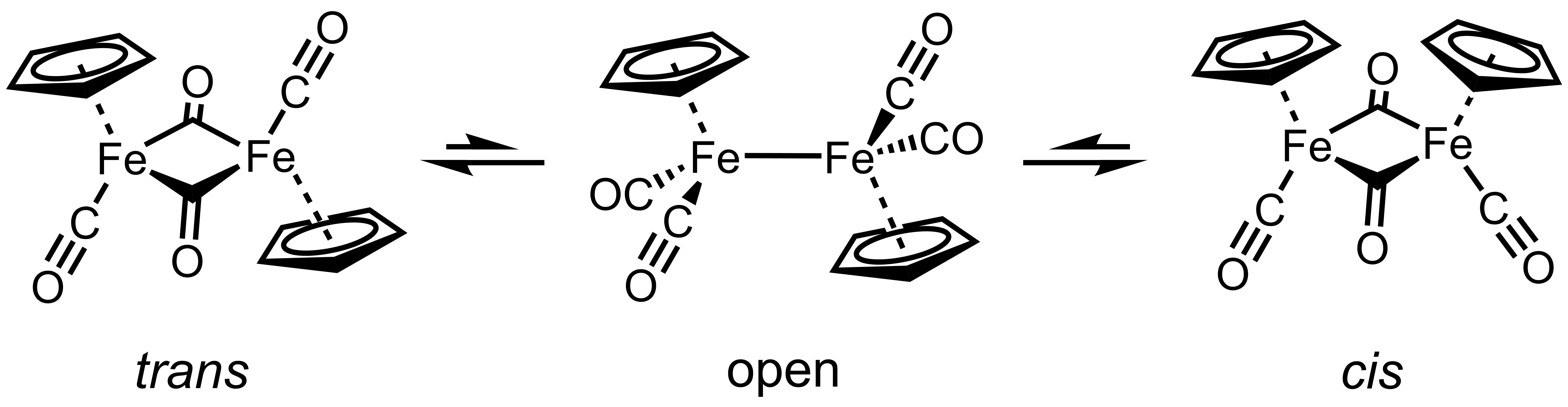

In addition, the terminal and bridging carbonyls are known to undergo exchange: the trans isomer can undergo bridging–terminal CO ligand exchange through the open isomer, or through a twisting motion without going through the open form. In contrast, the bridging and terminal CO ligands of the cis isomer can only exchange via the open isomer.

In solution, the cis, trans, and open isomers interconvert rapidly at room temperature, making the molecular structure fluxional. The fluxional process for cyclopentadienyliron dicarbonyl dimer is faster than the NMR time scale, so that only an averaged, single Cp signal is observed in the ^{1}H NMR spectrum at 25 °C. Likewise, the ^{13}C NMR spectrum exhibits one sharp CO signal above −10 °C, while the Cp signal sharpens to one peak above 60 °C. NMR studies indicate that the cis isomer is slightly more abundant than the trans isomer at room temperature, while the amount of the open form is small. The fluxional process is not fast enough to produce averaging in the IR spectrum. Thus, three absorptions are seen for each isomer. The bridging CO ligands appear at around 1780 cm^{−1} whereas the terminal CO ligands are observed at around 1980 cm^{−1}. The averaged structure of these isomers of Cp_{2}Fe_{2}(CO)_{4} results in a dipole moment of 3.1 D in benzene.

The solid-state molecular structure of both cis and trans isomers have been analyzed by X-ray and neutron diffraction. The Fe–Fe separation and the Fe–C bond lengths are the same in the Fe_{2}C_{2} rhomboids, an exactly planar Fe_{2}C_{2} four-membered ring in the trans isomer versus a folded rhomboid in cis with an angle of 164°, and significant distortions in the Cp ring of the trans isomer reflecting different Cp orbital populations. Although older textbooks show the two iron atoms bonded to each other, theoretical analyses indicate the absence of a direct Fe–Fe bond. This view is consistent with computations and X-ray crystallographic data that indicate a lack of significant electron density between the iron atoms. However, Labinger offers a dissenting view, based primarily on chemical reactivity and spectroscopic data, arguing that electron density is not necessarily the best indication of the presence of a chemical bond. Moreover, without an Fe–Fe bond, the bridging carbonyls must be formally treated as an μ-X_{2} ligand and μ-L ligand in order for the iron centers to satisfy the 18-electron rule. This formalism is argued to give misleading implications with respect to the chemical and spectroscopic behavior of the carbonyl groups.

== Synthesis ==
Cp_{2}Fe_{2}(CO)_{4} was first prepared in 1955 using the same method employed today: the reaction of iron pentacarbonyl and dicyclopentadiene.

2 Fe(CO)_{5} + C_{10}H_{12} → (η^{5}-C_{5}H_{5})_{2}Fe_{2}(CO)_{4} + 6 CO + H_{2}

In this preparation, dicyclopentadiene cracks to give cyclopentadiene, which reacts with Fe(CO)_{5} with loss of CO. Thereafter, the pathways for the photochemical and thermal routes differ subtly but both entail formation of a hydride intermediate. The method is used in the teaching laboratory.

== Reactions ==
Although of no major commercial value, Fp_{2} was a workhorse in organometallic chemistry because it is inexpensive and FpX derivatives are rugged (X = halide, organyl).

=== "Fp^{−}" (FpNa and FpK) ===
Reductive cleavage of [CpFe(CO)_{2}]_{2} produces alkali metal derivatives. A typical reductant is sodium metal or sodium amalgam; NaK alloy, potassium graphite (KC_{8}), and alkali metal trialkylborohydrides. [CpFe(CO)_{2}]Na is readily alkylated, acylated, or metalated by treatment with an appropriate electrophile. It is an excellent S_{N}2 nucleophile, being one to two orders of magnitude more nucleophilic than thiophenolate, PhS^{–} when reacted with primary and secondary alkyl bromides.

[CpFe(CO)_{2}]_{2} + 2 Na → 2 CpFe(CO)_{2}Na
[CpFe(CO)_{2}]_{2} + 2 KBH(C_{2}H_{5})_{3} → 2 CpFe(CO)_{2}K + H_{2} + 2 B(C_{2}H_{5})_{3}

Treatment of NaFp with an methyl iodide produces the methyl derivative:

CpFe(CO)_{2}Na + CH_{3}I → CpFe(CO)_{2}CH_{3} + NaI

Fp_{2} can also be cleaved electrochemically.

=== FpX (X = Cl, Br, I) ===
Halogens oxidatively cleave [CpFe(CO)_{2}]_{2} to give the Fe(II) species FpX (X = Cl, Br, I):

[CpFe(CO)_{2}]_{2} + X_{2} → 2 CpFe(CO)_{2}X

One example is cyclopentadienyliron dicarbonyl iodide.

=== Fp(η^{2}-alkene)^{+}, Fp(η^{2}-alkyne)^{+} and other "Fp^{+}" ===
In the presence of halide anion acceptors such as aluminium bromide or silver tetrafluoroborate, FpX compounds (X = halide) react with alkenes, alkynes, or neutral labile ligands (such as ethers and nitriles) to afford Fp^{+} complexes. In another approach, salts of [Fp(isobutene)]^{+} are readily obtained by reaction of NaFp with methallyl chloride followed by protonolysis. This complex is a convenient and general precursor to other cationic Fp–alkene and Fp–alkyne complexes. The exchange process is facilitated by the loss of gaseous and bulky isobutene. Generally, less substituted alkenes bind more strongly and can displace more hindered alkene ligands. Alkene and alkyne complexes can also be prepared by heating a cationic ether or aqua complex, for example [Fp(thf)]^{+}BF^{−}_{4}, with the alkene or alkyne. [FpL]^{+}BF^{−}_{4} complexes can also be prepared by treatment of FpMe with HBF_{4}·Et_{2}O in CH_{2}Cl_{2} at −78 °C, followed by addition of L.

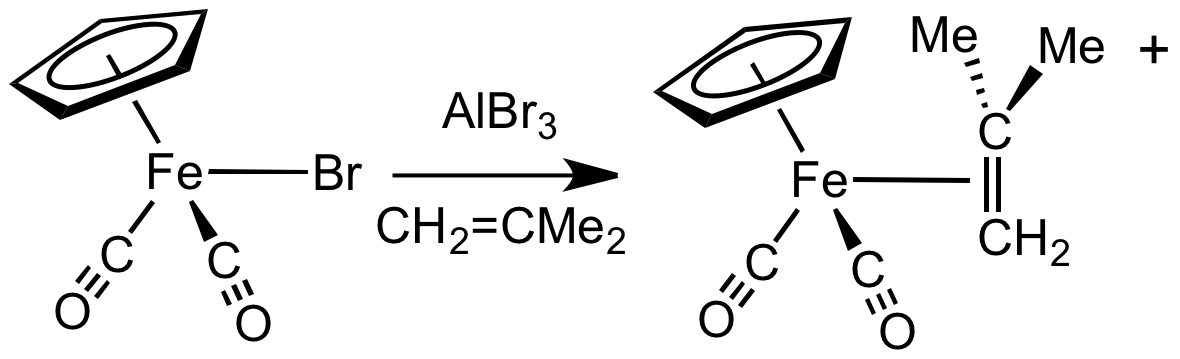

Alkene–Fp complexes can also be prepared from Fp anion indirectly. Thus, hydride abstraction from Fp–alkyl compounds using triphenylmethyl hexafluorophosphate affords [Fp(α-alkene)]^{+} complexes.

FpNa + RCH_{2}CH_{2}I → FpCH_{2}CH_{2}R + NaI
FpCH_{2}CH_{2}R + Ph_{3}CPF_{6} → [Fp(CH_{2}=CHR)^{+}]PF^{−}_{6} + Ph_{3}CH

Reaction of NaFp with an epoxide followed by acid-promoted dehydration also affords alkene complexes. Fp(alkene)^{+} are stable with respect to bromination, hydrogenation, and acetoxymercuration, but the alkene is easily released with sodium iodide in acetone or by warming with acetonitrile.

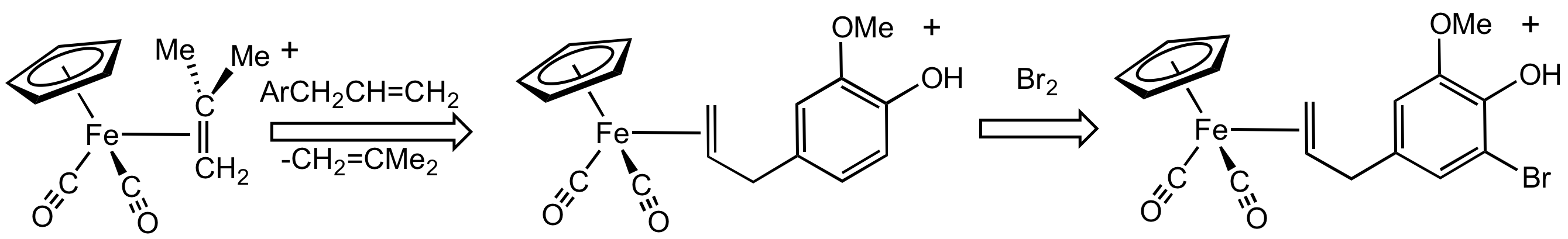

The alkene ligand in these cations is activated toward attack by nucleophiles, opening the way to a number of carbon–carbon bond-forming reactions. Nucleophilic additions usually occur at the more substituted carbon. This regiochemistry is attributed to the greater positive charge density at this position. The regiocontrol is often modest. The addition of the nucleophile is completely stereoselective, occurring anti to the Fp group. Analogous Fp(alkyne)^{+} complexes are also reported to undergo nucleophilic addition reactions by various carbon, nitrogen, and oxygen nucleophiles.

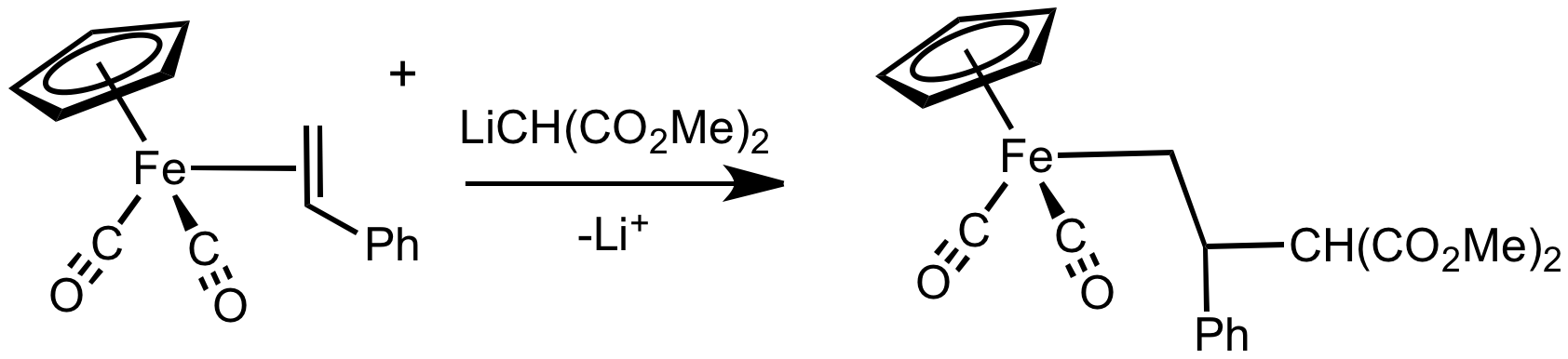

Fp(alkene)^{+} and Fp(alkyne)^{+} π-complexes are also quite acidic at the allylic and propargylic positions, respectively, and can be quantitatively deprotonated with amine bases like Et_{3}N to give neutral Fp–allyl and Fp–allenyl σ-complexes (eqn 1, shown for alkene complex).

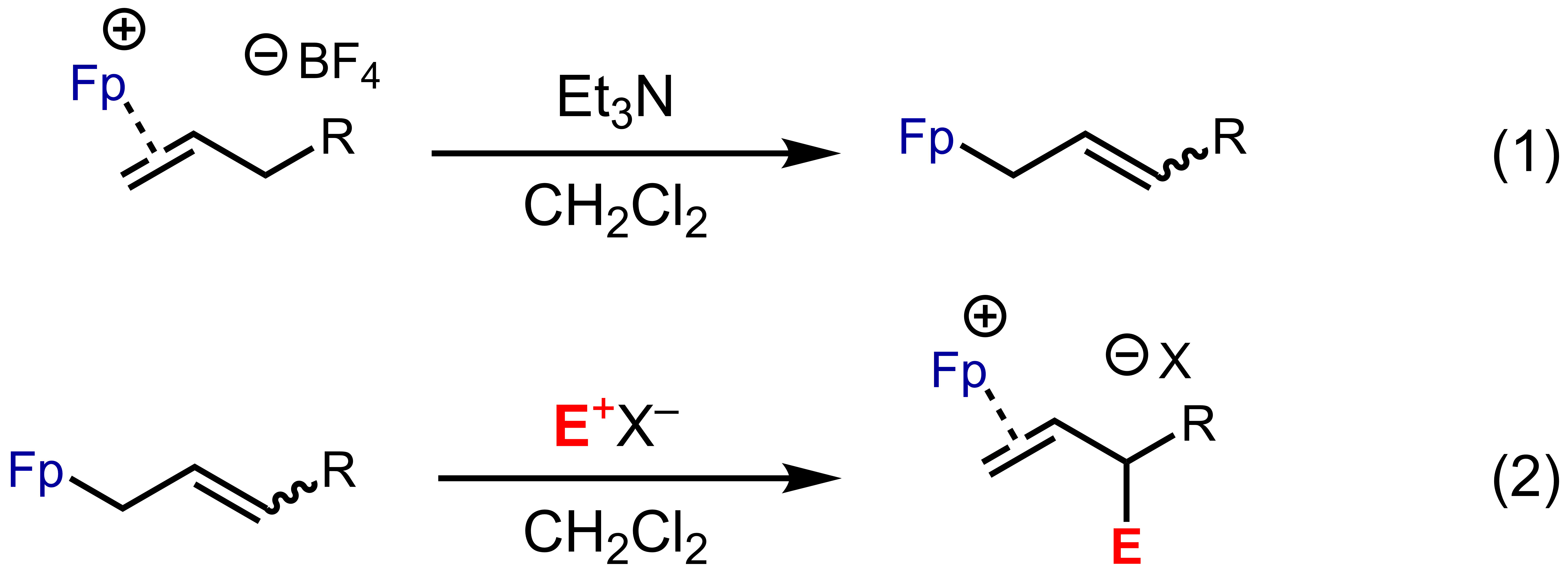

Fp–allyl and Fp–allenyl react with cationic electrophiles E (such as Me_{3}O^{+}, carbocations, oxocarbenium ions) to generate allylic and propargylic functionalization products, respectively (eqn 2, shown for allyliron). The related complex [Cp*Fe(CO)_{2}(thf)]^{+}[BF_{4}]^{−} (Cp* = C_{5}Me_{5}) has been shown to catalyze propargylic, allylic, and allenic C−H functionalization by combining the deprotonation and electrophilic functionalization processes described above with facile exchange of the unsaturated hydrocarbon bound to the cationic iron center.

η^{2}-Allenyl complexes of Fp^{+} and substituted cyclopentadienyliron dicarbonyl cations have also been characterized, with X-ray crystallographic analysis showing substantial bending at the central allenic carbon (bond angle < 150°).

=== Fp-based cyclopropanation reagents ===
Fp-based reagents have been developed for cyclopropanations. The key reagent is prepared from FpNa with a thioether and methyl iodide, and has a good shelf-life, in contrast to typical Simmons-Smith intermediates and diazoalkanes.

FpNa + ClCH_{2}SCH_{3} → FpCH_{2}SCH_{3} + NaCl
FpCH_{2}SCH_{3} + CH_{3}I + NaBF_{4} → FpCH_{2}S(CH_{3})_{2}]BF_{4} + NaI

Use of [FpCH_{2}S(CH_{3})_{2}]BF_{4} does not require specialized conditions.

Fp(CH_{2}S^{+}(CH_{3})_{2})BF^{−}_{4} + (Ph)_{2}C=CH_{2} → 1,1-diphenylcyclopropane + …

Iron(III) chloride is added to destroy any byproduct.

Precursors to Fp=CH^{+}_{2}, like FpCH_{2}OMe which is converted to the iron carbene upon protonation, have also been used as cyclopropanation reagents.

=== Photochemical reaction ===
Fp_{2} exhibits photochemistry. For example, upon UV irradiation at 350 nm, it is reduced by benzylnicotinamide|1-benzyl-1,4-dihydronicotinamide dimer, also known as (BNA)_{2}.

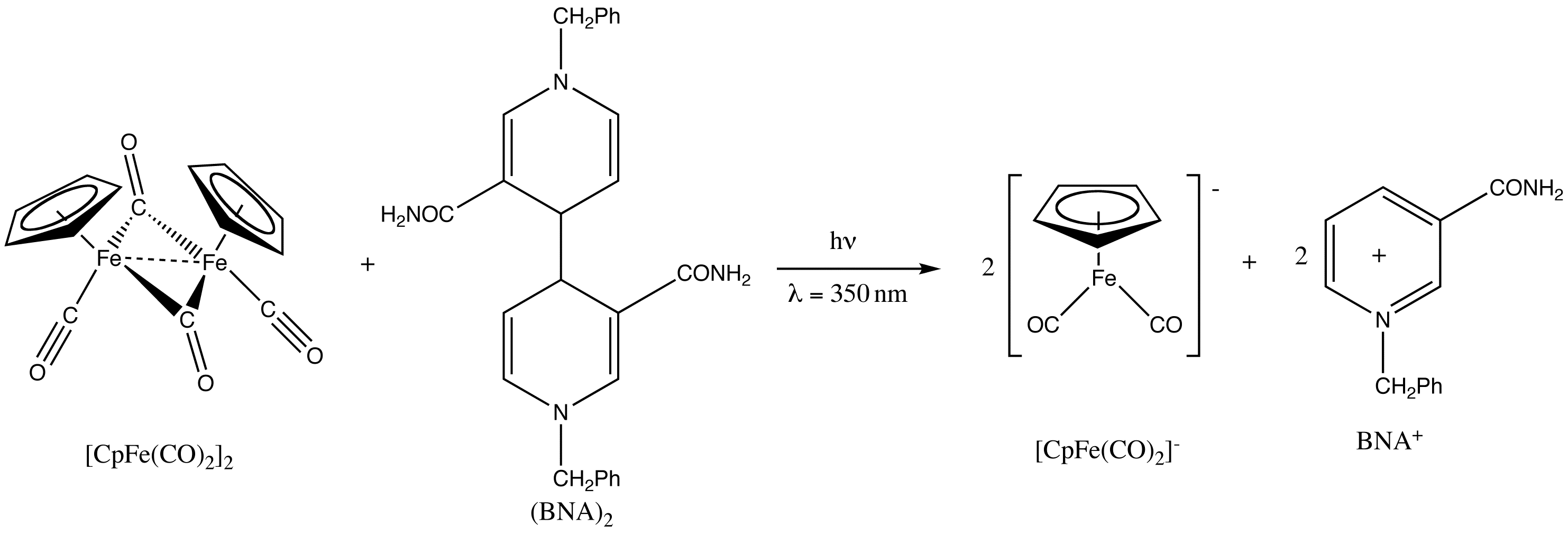
