= Organoiron chemistry =

Chemistry of iron compounds containing a carbon-to-iron chemical bond

Organoiron chemistry is the chemistry of iron compounds containing a carbon-to-iron chemical bond. Organoiron compounds are relevant in organic synthesis as reagents such as iron pentacarbonyl, diiron nonacarbonyl and disodium tetracarbonylferrate. Although iron is generally less active in many catalytic applications, it is less expensive and "greener" than other metals. Organoiron compounds feature a wide range of ligands that support the Fe-C bond; as with other organometals, these supporting ligands prominently include phosphines, carbon monoxide, and cyclopentadienyl, but hard ligands such as amines are employed as well.

== Iron(–II) and Iron(0) ==
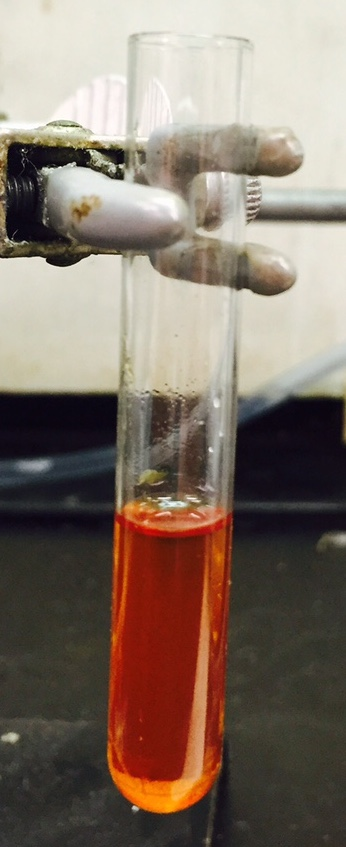
Iron pentacarbonyl.

=== Carbonyl complexes ===
Important iron carbonyls are the three neutral binary carbonyls, iron pentacarbonyl, diiron nonacarbonyl, and triiron dodecacarbonyl. One or more carbonyl ligands in these compounds can be replaced by a variety of other ligands including alkenes and phosphines. An iron(–II) complex, disodium tetracarbonylferrate (Na_{2}[Fe(CO)_{4}]), also known as "Collman's Reagent," is prepared by reducing iron pentacarbonyl with metallic sodium. The highly nucleophilic anionic reagent can be alkylated and carbonylated to give the acyl derivatives that undergo protonolysis to afford aldehydes:

LiFe(CO)_{4}(C(O)R) + H^{+} → RCHO (+ iron containing products)

Similar iron acyls can be accessed by treating iron pentacarbonyl with organolithium compounds:

ArLi + Fe(CO)_{5} → LiFe(CO)_{4}C(O)Ar

In this case, the carbanion attacks a CO ligand. In a complementary reaction, Collman's reagent can be used to convert acyl chlorides to aldehydes. Similar reactions can be achieved with [HFe(CO)_{4}]^{−} salts.

=== Alkene-Fe(0)-CO derivatives ===
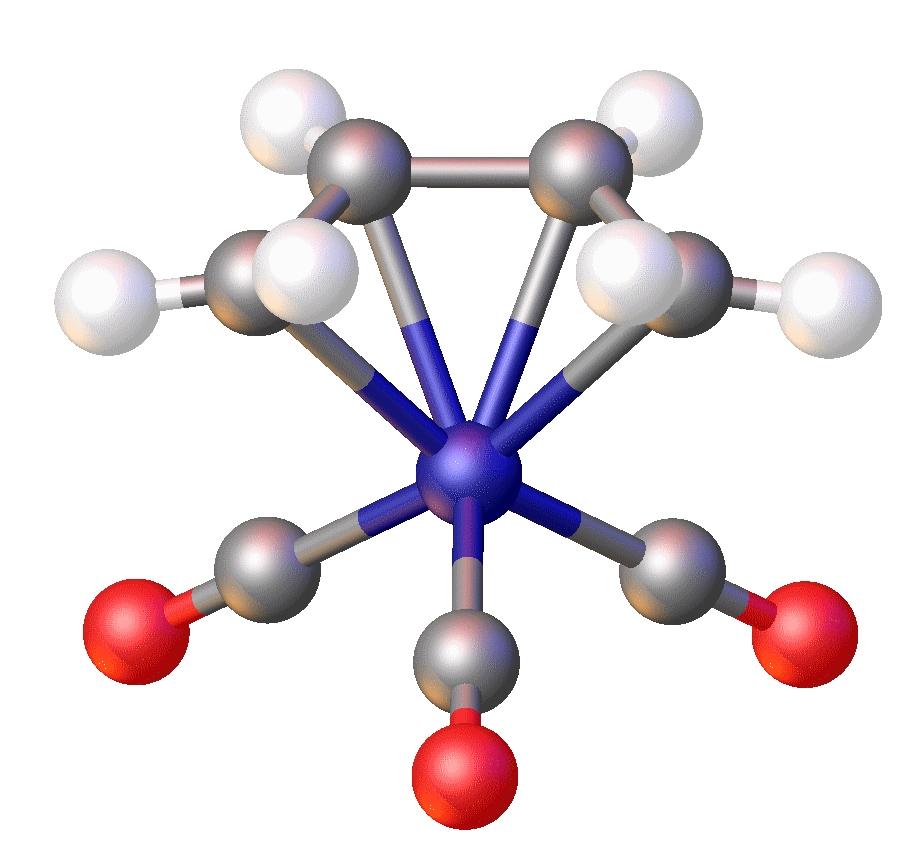
(Butadiene)iron tricarbonyl

=== Monoalkenes ===
Iron pentacarbonyl reacts photochemically with alkenes to give Fe(CO)_{4}(alkene).

=== Diene-Fe(0)-CO derivatives ===
Iron diene complexes are usually prepared from Fe(CO)_{5} or Fe_{2}(CO)_{9}. Derivatives are known for common dienes like cyclohexadiene, norbornadiene and cyclooctadiene, but even cyclobutadiene can be stabilized. In the complex with butadiene, the diene adopts a cis-conformation. Iron carbonyls are potential protective groups for dienes, shielding them from hydrogenations and Diels-Alder reactions. Cyclobutadieneiron tricarbonyl is prepared from 3,4-dichlorocyclobutene and Fe_{2}(CO)_{9}.

Cyclohexadienes, many derived from Birch reduction of aromatic compounds, form derivatives (diene)Fe(CO)_{3}. The affinity of the Fe(CO)_{3} unit for conjugated dienes is manifested in the ability of iron carbonyls catalyse the isomerisations of 1,5-cyclooctadiene to 1,3-cyclooctadiene. Cyclohexadiene complexes undergo hydride abstraction to give cyclohexadienyl cations, which add nucleophiles. Hydride abstraction from cyclohexadiene iron(0) complexes gives ferrous derivatives.

The enone complex (benzylideneacetone)iron tricarbonyl serves as a source of the Fe(CO)_{3} subunit and is employed to prepare other derivatives. It is used similarly to Fe_{2}(CO)_{9}.

=== Alkyne-Fe(0)-CO derivatives ===
Alkynes react with iron carbonyls to give a large variety of derivatives. Derivatives include ferroles (Fe_{2}(C_{4}R_{4})(CO)_{6}), (p-quinone)Fe(CO)_{3}, (cyclobutadiene)Fe(CO)_{3} and many others.

=== Tri- and polyene Fe(0) complexes ===
Stable iron-containing complexes with and without CO ligands are known for a wide variety of polyunsaturated hydrocarbons, e.g. cycloheptatriene, azulene, and bullvalene. In the case of cyclooctatetraene (COT), derivatives include Fe(COT)_{2}, Fe_{3}(COT)_{3}, and several mixed COT-carbonyls (e.g. Fe(COT)(CO)_{3} and Fe_{2}(COT)(CO)_{6}).

Bis(cyclooctatetraene)iron is an Fe(0) complex lacking CO ligands.

== Iron(I) and iron(II) ==
As Fe(II) is a common oxidation state for Fe, many organoiron(II) compounds are known. Fe(I) compounds often feature Fe-Fe bonds, but exceptions occur, such as [Fe(anthracene)_{2}]^{−}.

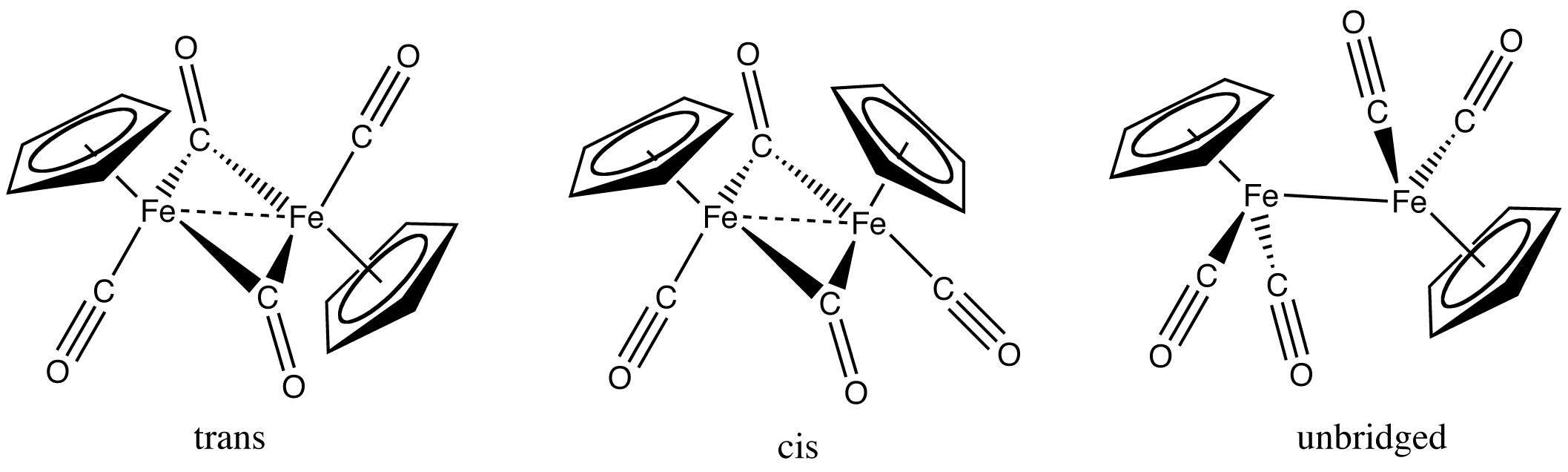
cyclopentadienyliron dicarbonyl dimer

=== Ferrocene and its derivatives ===
The rapid growth of organometallic chemistry in the 20th century can be traced to the discovery of ferrocene, a very stable compound which foreshadowed the synthesis of many related sandwich compounds. Ferrocene is formed by reaction of sodium cyclopentadienide with iron(II) chloride:

2 NaC_{5}H_{5} + FeCl_{2} → Fe(C_{5}H_{5})_{2} + 2 NaCl

Ferrocene displays diverse reactivity localized on the cyclopentadienyl ligands, including Friedel–Crafts reactions and lithation. Some electrophilic functionalization reactions, however, proceed via initial attack at the Fe center to give the bent [Cp_{2}Fe–Z]^{+} species (which are formally Fe(IV)). For instance, HF:PF_{5} and Hg(OTFA)_{2}, give isolable or spectroscopically observable complexes [Cp_{2}Fe–H]^{+}PF_{6}^{–} and Cp_{2}Fe^{+}–Hg^{–}(OTFA)_{2}, respectively.

Ferrocene is also a structurally unusual scaffold as illustrated by the popularity of ligands such as 1,1'-bis(diphenylphosphino)ferrocene, which are useful in catalysis. Treatment of ferrocene with aluminium trichloride and benzene gives the cation [CpFe(C_{6}H_{6})]^{+}. Further iron arene complexes are also possible. Oxidation of ferrocene gives the blue 17e species ferrocenium. Derivatives of fullerene can also act as a highly substituted cyclopentadienyl ligand.

=== Fp_{2}, Fp^{−}, and Fp^{+} and derivatives ===
Fe(CO)_{5} reacts with cyclopentadiene to give the dinuclear Fe(I) species cyclopentadienyliron dicarbonyl dimer ([FeCp(CO)_{2}]_{2}), often abbreviated as Fp_{2}. Pyrolysis of Fp_{2} gives the cuboidal cluster [FeCp(CO)]_{4}.

Very hindered substituted cyclopentadienyl ligands can give isolable monomeric Fe(I) species. For example, Cp^{i-Pr5}Fe(CO)_{2} (Cp^{i-Pr5} = i-Pr_{5}C_{5}) has been characterized crystallographically.

Reduction of Fp_{2} with sodium gives "NaFp", containing a potent nucleophile and precursor to many derivatives of the type CpFe(CO)_{2}R. The derivative [FpCH_{2}S(CH_{3})_{2}]^{+} has been used in cyclopropanations. The Fp^{+} fragment is Lewis acidic and readily forms complexes with ethers, amines, pyridine, etc., as well as alkenes and alkynes in the η^{2} coordination mode. The complex Fp^{+}(η^{2}-vinyl ether)]^{+} is a masked vinyl cation. Recently, a methane complex, [Fp(CH_{4})]^{+}[Al(OC(CF_{3})_{3})_{4}]^{–}, was prepared and characterized spectroscopically, using a perfluoroalkoxyaluminate as a non-coordinating counterion and 1,1,1,3,3,3-hexafluoropropane as a non-coordinating solvent.

Fp-R compounds are prochiral, and studies have exploited the chiral derivatives CpFe(PPh_{3})(CO)acyl.

=== Alkyl, allyl, and aryl compounds ===
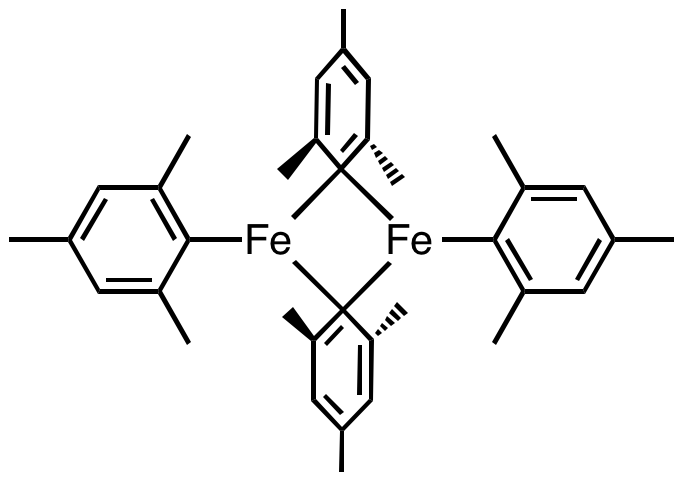
tetramesityldiiron is a rare example of a neutral per-organo complex of iron

The simple peralkyl and peraryl complexes of iron are less numerous than are the Cp and CO derivatives. One example is tetramesityldiiron. Compounds of the type [(η^{3}-allyl)Fe(CO)_{4}]^{+}X^{−} are allyl cation synthons in allylic substitution. In contrast, compounds of the type [(η^{5}-C_{5}H_{5})Fe(CO)_{2}(CH_{2}CH=CHR)] possessing η^{1}-allyl groups are analogous to main group allylmetal species (M = B, Si, Sn, etc.) and react with carbon electrophiles to give allylation products with S_{E}2′ selectivity. Similarly, allenyl(cyclopentadienyliron) dicarbonyl complexes exhibit reactivity analogous to main group allenylmetal species and serve as nucleophilic propargyl synthons.

=== Sulfur and phosphorus derivatives ===
Complexes of the type Fe_{2}(SR)_{2}(CO)_{6} and Fe_{2}(PR_{2})_{2}(CO)_{6} form, usually by the reaction of thiols and secondary phosphines with iron carbonyls. The thiolates can also be obtained from the tetrahedrane Fe_{2}S_{2}(CO)_{6}.

== Iron(III) ==
Alkylation of FeCl_{3} with methylmagnesium bromide gives [Fe(CH_{3})_{4}]^{–}, which is thermally labile. Such compounds may be relevant to the mechanism of Fe-catalyzed cross coupling reactions.

Some organoiron(III) compounds are prepared by oxidation of organoiron(II) compounds. A long-known example being ferrocenium [(C_{5}H_{5})_{2}Fe]^{+}. Organoiron(III) porphyrin complexes, including alkyl and aryl derivatives, are also numerous.

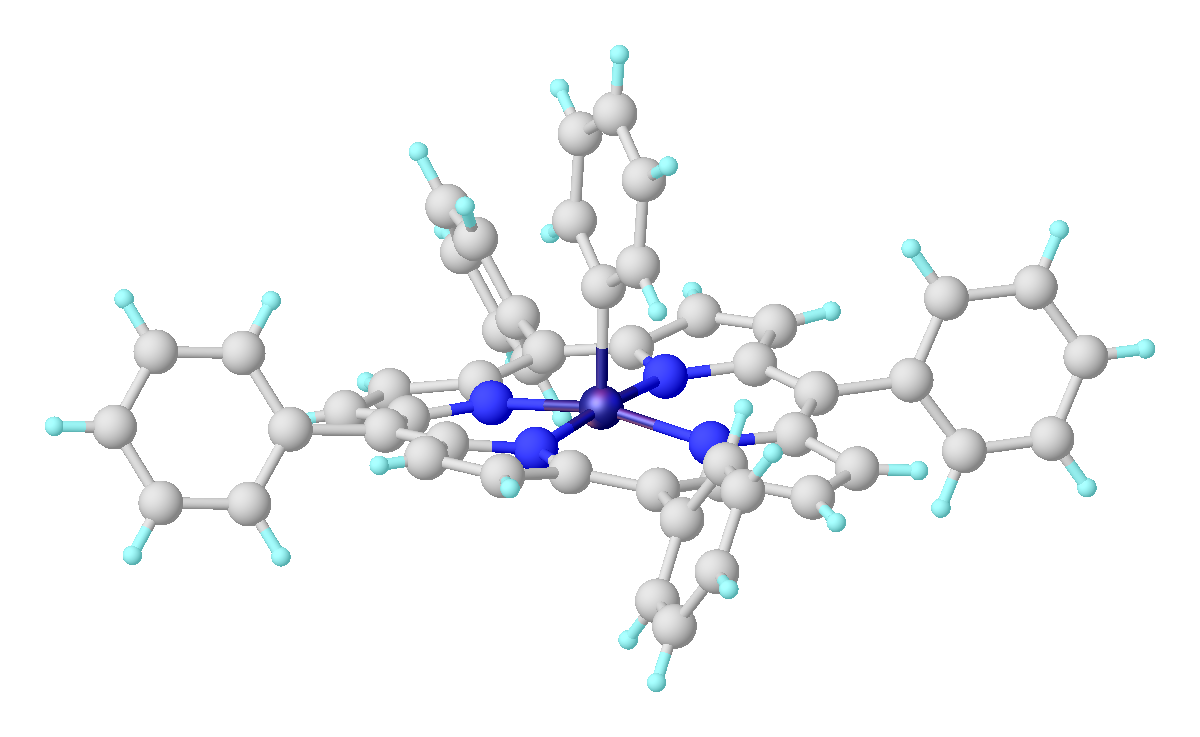
Structure of Fe(tetraphenylporphyrin)C_{6}H_{5}.

== Iron(IV) ==
Fe(4-norbornyl)_{4} is a rare example of a low-spin tetrahedral complex.

In Fe(norbornyl)_{4}, Fe(IV) is stabilized by an alkyl ligand that resists beta-hydride elimination. Surprisingly, FeCy_{4}, which is susceptible to beta-hydride elimination, has also been isolated and crystallographically characterized and is stable at –20 °C. The unexpected stability was attributed to stabilizing dispersive forces as well as conformational effects that disfavor beta-hydride elimination.

Two-electron oxidation of decamethylferrocene gives the dication [Fe(C_{5}Me_{5})_{2}]^{2+}, which forms a carbonyl complex, [Fe(C_{5}Me_{5})_{2}(CO)](SbF_{6})_{2}. Ferrocene is also known to undergo protonation at the iron center with HF/AlCl_{3} or HF/PF_{5} to give the formally Fe(IV) hydride complex, [Cp_{2}FeH]^{+}[PF_{6}]^{–}.

== Iron(V, VI, VII) ==
In 2020, Jeremy M. Smith and coworkers reported crystallographically characterized Fe(V) and Fe(VI) bisimido complexes based on a bidentate bis(carbene)borate ligand. By virtue of the supporting ligand architecture, these species constitute organometallic Fe(V) and Fe(VI) complexes.

In 2024, Karsten Meyer and coworkers reported a crystallographically characterized Fe(VI) nitrido complex, [(TIMMN^{Mes})Fe^{VI}(≡N)(F)](PF_{6})_{2}·CH_{2}Cl_{2}, which bears a tris(N-heterocyclic carbene) ligand (tris[(3-mesityl-imidazol-2-ylidene)methyl]amine). Related Fe(V) complexes were crystallographically characterized in the same study, while an Fe(VII) species that decomposes above –50 °C was characterized by Mössbauer spectroscopy.

== Organoiron compounds in organic synthesis and homogeneous catalysis ==
In industrial catalysis, iron complexes are seldom used in contrast to cobalt and nickel. Because of the low cost and low toxicity of its salts, iron is attractive as a stoichiometric reagent. Some areas of investigation include:

- Hydrogenation and reduction, for example catalyst Knölker complex.
- Cross-coupling reactions. Iron compounds such as Fe(acac)_{3} catalyze a wide range of cross-coupling reactions with one substrate an aryl or alkyl Grignard and the other substrate an aryl, alkenyl (vinyl), or acyl organohalide. In the related Kumada coupling the catalysts are based on palladium and nickel.
- Complexes derived from Schiff bases are active catalysts for olefin polymerization.

== Biochemistry ==
In the area of bioorganometallic chemistry, organoiron species are found at the active sites of the three hydrogenase enzymes as well as carbon monoxide dehydrogenase.
