= Disulfidobis(tricarbonyliron) =

μ-η2:η2-Disulfido-bis(tricarbonyliron)
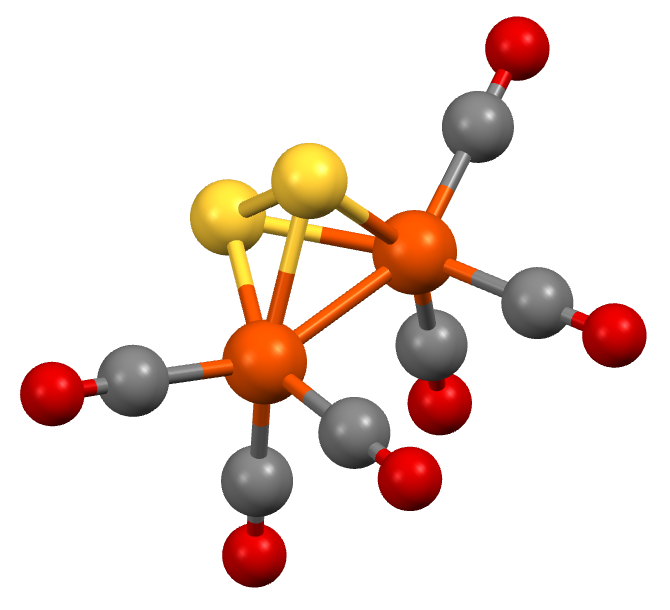

Names
- Systematic IUPAC name μ-η2:η2-Disulfido-bis(tricarbonyliron)

Identifiers
CAS Number	14243-23-3
3D model (JSmol)	Interactive image
- InChI: InChI=1S/6CO.2Fe.S2/c6*1-2;;;1-2 Key: NXFKJQTVZCOVCU-UHFFFAOYSA-N
- SMILES: [O+]#[C-][Fe]12([C-]#[O+])([C-]#[O+])[S]3[S]1[Fe]23([C-]#[O+])([C-]#[O+])[C-]#[O+]

Structure
Space group	P1̅, No. 2
Lattice constant	a = 6.538, b = 7.743, c = 11.413 α = 83.87°, β = 75.66°, γ = 78.73°
Lattice volume (V)	547.942
Coordination geometry	octahedral at Fe
- Except where otherwise noted, data are given for materials in their standard state (at 25 °C [77 °F], 100 kPa). Infobox references

Disulfidobis(tricarbonyliron), or Fe_{2}(μ-S_{2})(CO)_{6}, is an organometallic molecule used as a precursor in the synthesis of iron-sulfur compounds. Popularized as a synthetic building block by Dietmar Seyferth, Fe_{2}(μ-S_{2})(CO)_{6} is commonly used to make mimics of the H-cluster in [FeFe]-hydrogenase. Much of the reactivity of Fe_{2}(μ-S_{2})(CO)_{6} proceeds through its sulfur-centered dianion, [Fe_{2}(μ-S)_{2}(CO)_{2}]^{2-}.

== Synthesis and properties ==
The synthesis of Fe_{2}(μ-S_{2})(CO)_{6} was first reported in 1958 from iron pentacarbonyl and sodium polysulfide.

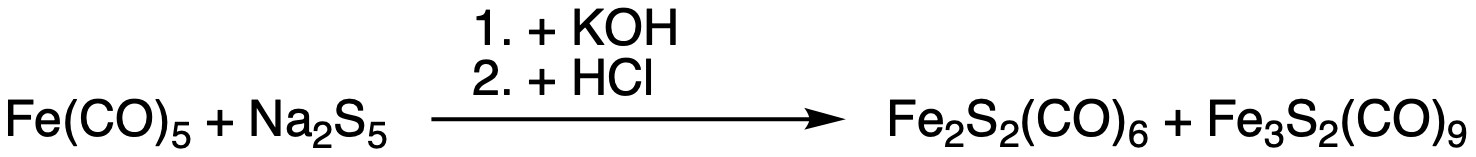

The vibrant red, air-stable product is formed alongside Fe_{3}S_{2}(CO)_{9}, and can be separated by sublimation. The molecule has an Fe_{2}S_{2} core with a distorted tetrahedron shape. The compound sublimes at 40 °C, melts at 46.5 °C, and decomposes at 70 °C. Fe_{2}(μ-S_{2})(CO)_{6} has three peaks in its infrared spectrum corresponding to three distinct carbonyl stretching frequencies, indicating that the carbonyl ligands are inequivalent. There are multiple peaks in the ultraviolet-visible spectrum, with a peak at 449 nm corresponding to a metal-to-ligand charge transfer band. The dianion [Fe_{2}(μ-S)_{2}(CO)_{2}]^{2-} is most easily prepared by reduction of Fe_{2}(μ-S_{2})(CO)_{6} with LiBEt_{3}H, also known as Super-Hydride.

In the neutral cluster, the sulfur atoms are bound to each other, forming a disulfide ligand. In the sulfur-centered dianion, the sulfur-sulfur bond is broken, forming two anionic sulfide ligands. Therefore, the bridging unit in the neutral cluster is a S_{2}^{2-} ligand, while the bridging unit in the dianion is a single S^{2-} ion.

Studies of the coupling between iron-57 and carbon-13 atoms in carbon-13 NMR spectroscopy indicate rapid intermolecular exchange of carbonyl ligands between clusters.

== Structure and bonding ==
The crystal structure of Fe_{2}(μ-S_{2})(CO)_{6} was first reported in 1965. The Fe_{2}S_{2} core forms a tetrahedron, though calculations show that the 'butterfly' structure with a broken S–S bond and diradical character is not substantially higher in energy. Seeking to explain the compound's diamagnetism, both an iron–iron and a sulfur–sulfur bond were proposed. In early works, to comport with a d^{2}sp^{3} hybrid orbital interpretation of the bonding in octahedral metal complexes, the metal–metal bond was proposed to be "bent." However, the directionality of this bond faced some controversy. With the advent of computational chemistry programs such as density functional theory (DFT) and the quantum theory of atoms in molecules (QTAIM), this bond and its topology have been thoroughly investigated, and some calculations support a nonlinear iron–iron bond. However, these calculations indicate that the bond angle is likely closer to 15° than the 130° originally proposed.

Computational work indicates that the highest occupied molecular orbital (HOMO) of the compound is Fe–Fe bonding in nature and substantially delocalized, while the lowest unoccupied molecular orbital (LUMO) is a localized S–S sigma bond. Much of the sulfur-centered reactivity of this compound can thus be understood in terms of frontier orbital theory.

== Reactivity ==
The Fe_{2}(μ-S_{2})(CO)_{6} molecule is a useful synthetic precursor to a variety of Fe–S multinuclear compounds. Reactivity frequently begins with reductive cleavage of the sulfur–sulfur bond to [Fe_{2}(μ-S)_{2}(CO)_{2}]^{2-}, though syntheses directly from the neutral cluster are also known.

=== Reactivity through the dianion ===
The first step in many reactions with Fe_{2}(μ-S_{2})(CO)_{6} is reduction to the dianion, which is easily performed with lithium triethylborohydride.

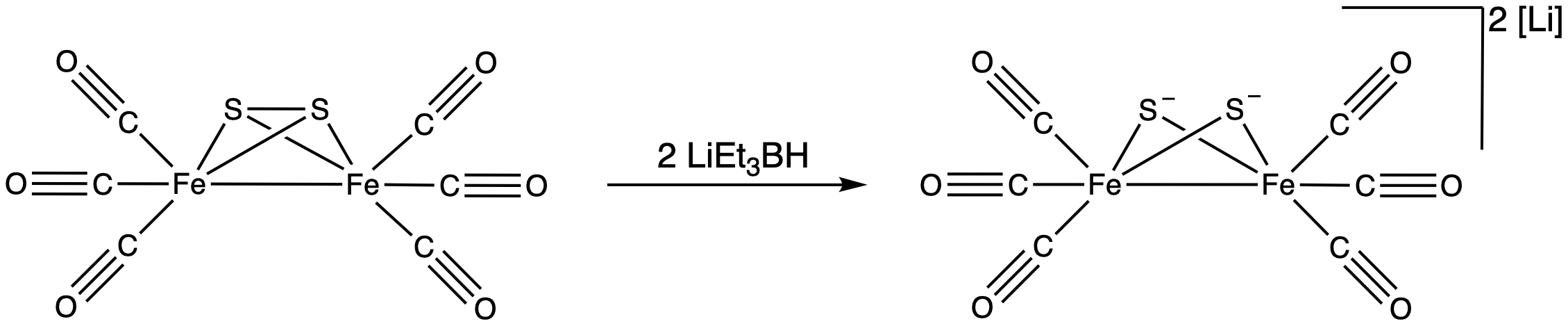

The resulting dianion can then be reacted with a dihaloalkane to form a cyclic alkane thiolate. Cyclic alkane thiolates have been used as precursors to active catalysts for electrocatalytic hydrogen evolution, which can be considered a model reaction for the all-iron hydrogenase.

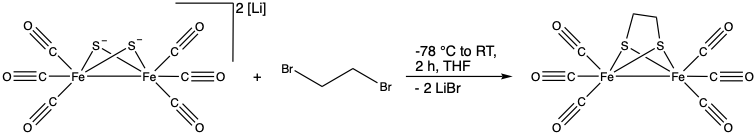

The dianion can also be treated with two different haloalkanes to form an asymmetric alkylated species.

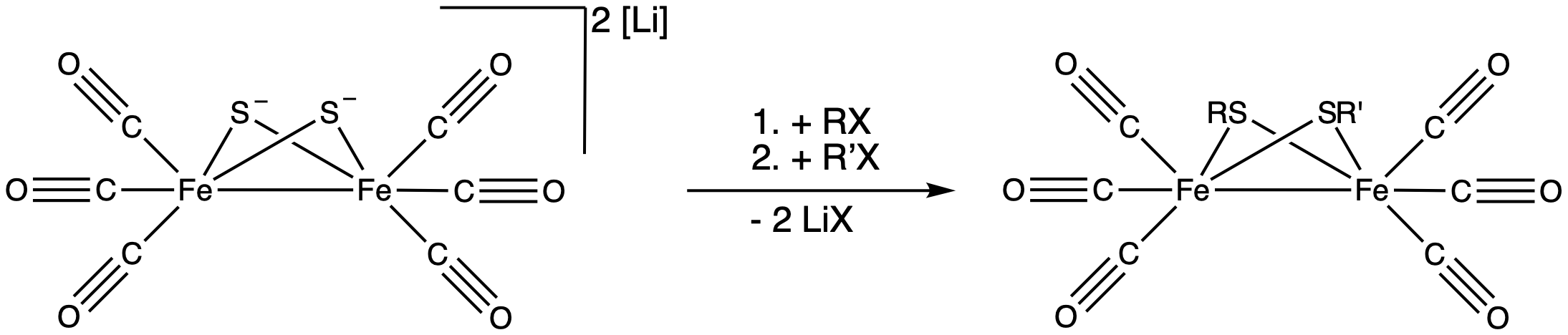

In addition to electrophilic organic reagents, [Fe_{2}(μ-S)_{2}(CO)_{2}]^{2-} can be treated with inorganic or organometallic reagents to insert a variety of heterometals.

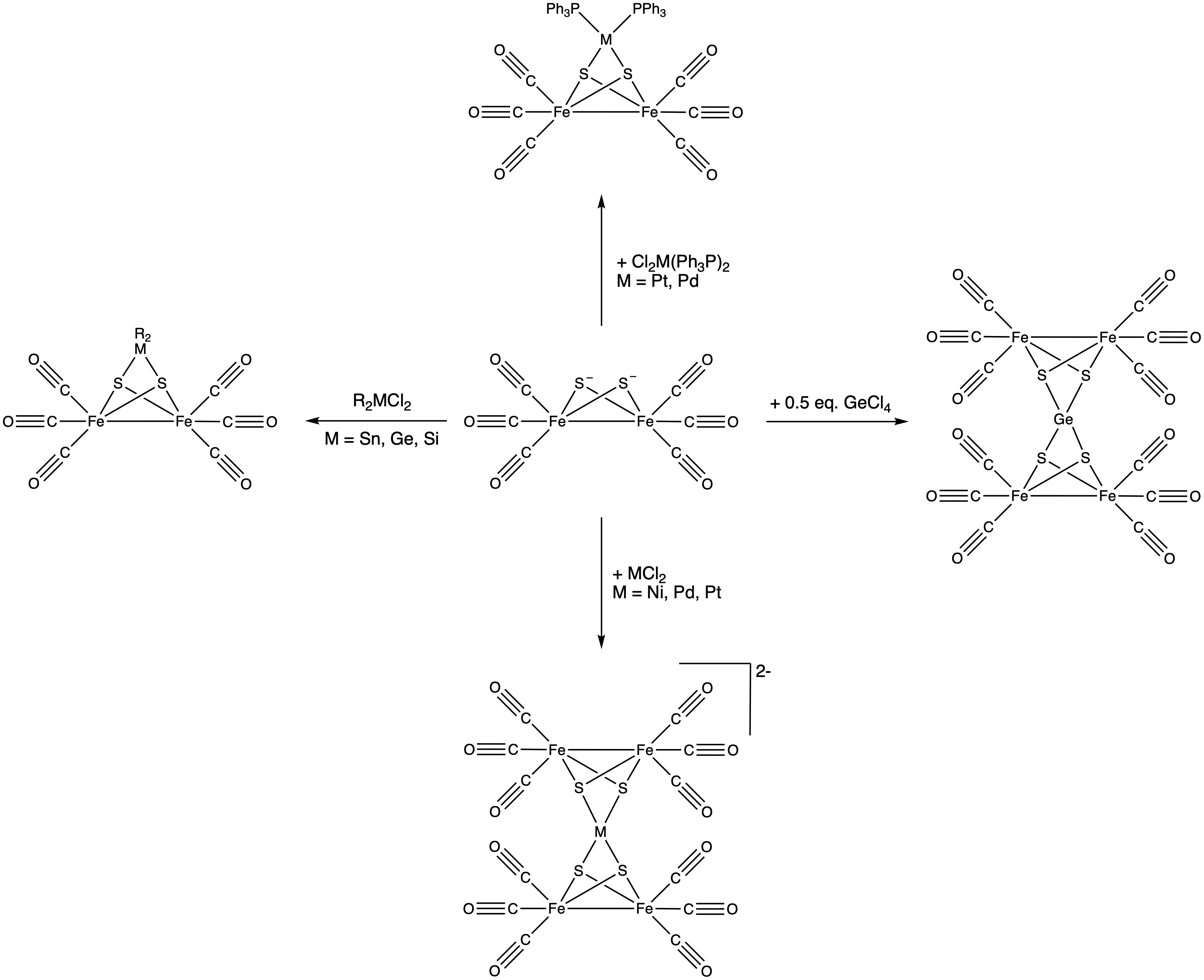

=== Reactivity directly from the neutral compound ===
The neutral compound is electrophilic at the sulfur–sulfur bond, meaning that it can be treated with carbanionic reagents (for example, Grignard or organolithium reagents). Use of carbanionic reagents (RM) allows for asymmetric functionalization of the two sulfur atoms.

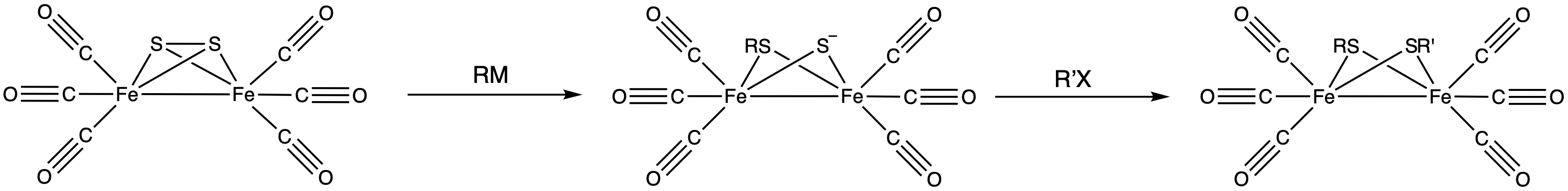

Reactivity mimicking that of the dianion can be achieved directly from the neutral species through photochemistry. Fe_{2}(μ-S_{2})(CO)_{6} absorbs light at 450 nm, corresponding to a metal-to-ligand charge transfer (MLCT) from the Fe-centered HOMO to the S-centered LUMO. As the HOMO is bonding with respect to the Fe–Fe bond, and the LUMO is antibonding with respect to the S–S bond, promotion of an electron from the HOMO to the LUMO weakens both bonds. This can be treated as reduction of the sulfur bridge by the iron core.

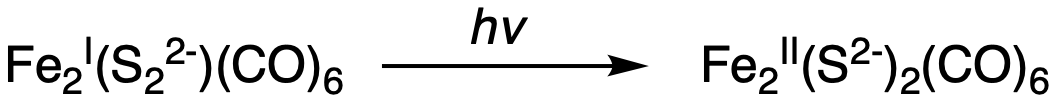

Temporary sulfur-centered dianion character allows the formally neutral molecule to perform oxidative addition reactions with organic small molecules:

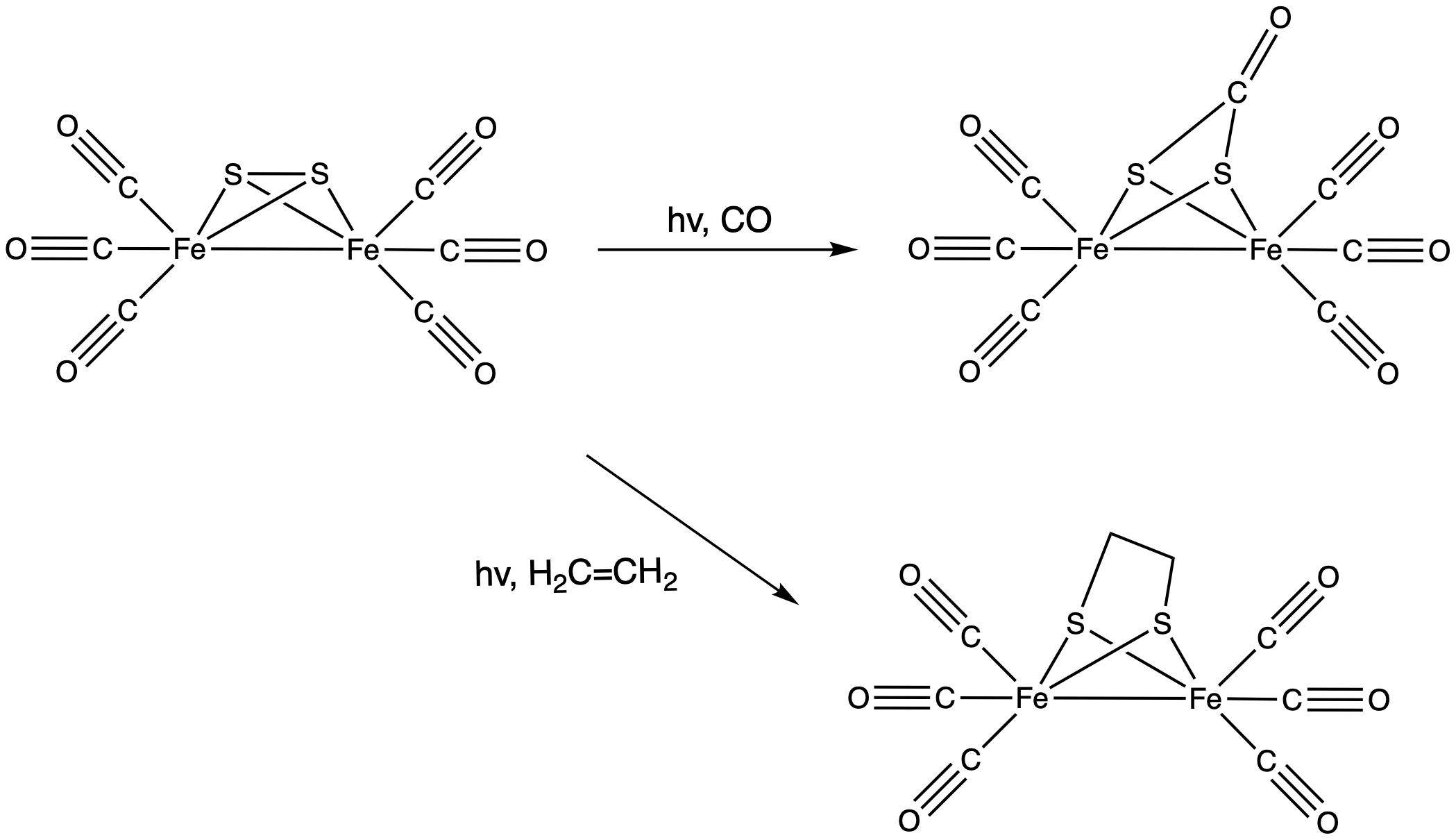

=== Reactivity through the dithiol derivative ===
Synthetic models of the H-cluster of the all-iron hydrogenase have been synthesized. Treating the dianion [Fe_{2}(μ-S)_{2}(CO)_{2}]^{2-} with trifluoroacetic acid produces the dithiol derivative Fe_{2}(μ-SH)_{2}(CO)_{6}, which can then be reacted with ammonium carbonate in paraformaldehyde to form a structural model of the H-cluster.

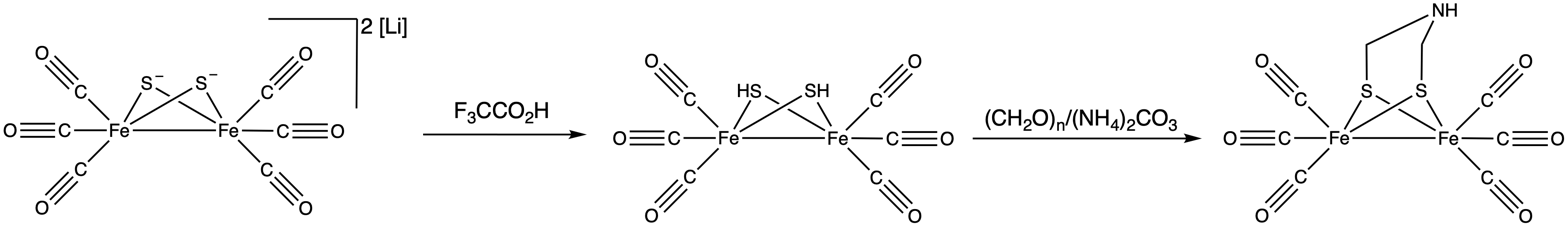

=== Precatalyst for electrocatalytic H_{2} production ===
In addition to structural mimics of the H-cluster, work has been done to model the reactivity of the all-Fe hydrogenase. The cyclic propyl thiolate cluster derived from Fe_{2}(μ-S_{2})(CO)_{6} (see above) acts as a precatalyst, and when treated with acid in an electrolysis cell, hydrogen gas is produced. As a result, this system can be used as a model to better understand the mechanism of hydrogen production in the all-Fe hydrogenase.

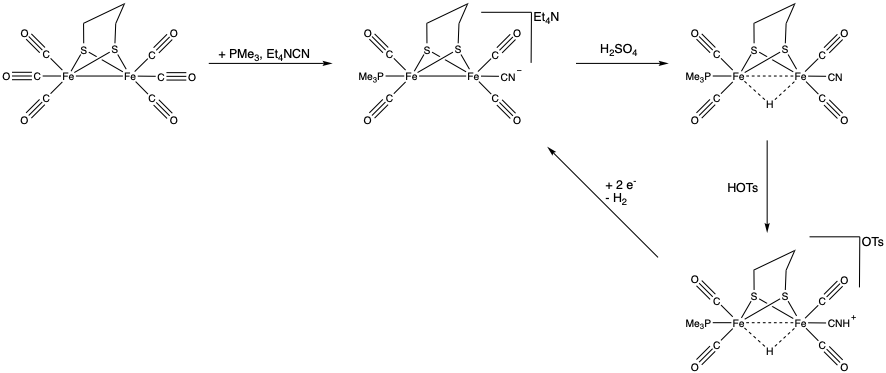

== Applications beyond chemical synthesis ==
The synthesis of Fe_{2}(μ-S_{2})(CO)_{6} has been proposed as an educational experiment in upper-level undergraduate inorganic laboratory courses.
