= Petrenko-Kritschenko piperidone synthesis =

Reaction in organic chemistry

Named after	Paul Petrenko-Kritschenko
Reaction type	multicomponent ring-condensation

Reaction
aldehyde
+
aldehyde
+
3-Keto acid derivative
+
ammonia or primary amine
↓
4-piperidone
+
water

Conditions
Typical solvents	typically water or alcohols at room temperature

The Petrenko-Kritschenko reaction is a classic multicomponent-name reaction that is closely related to the Robinson–Schöpf tropinone synthesis, but was published 12 years earlier.

== Classic reaction ==
In the original publication diethyl-α-ketoglurate, a derivative of acetonedicarboxylic acid, is used in combination with ammonia and benzaldehyde. The relative stereochemistry was not elucidated in the original publication, structural analysis using X-rays or NMR was not available in these days. In the absence of ammonia or ammonium salts a 4-oxotetrahydropyran is formed.

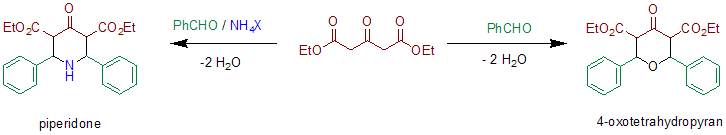
Petrenko-Kritschenko type cyclizations

In contrast to the Robinson synthesis, it does not employ dialdehydes like succinaldehyde or glutaraldehyde but simpler aldehydes like benzaldehyde. Therefore, the product of the reaction is not a bicyclic structure (see tropinone and pseudopelletierine) but a 4-piperidone. The synthesis of tropinone can be seen as a variation of the Petrenko-Kritschenko reaction in which the two aldehyde functions are covalently linked in a single molecule. Apart from the Hantzsch synthesis the Petrenko-Kritschenko reaction is one of the few examples in which a symmetric pyridine precursor can be obtained in a multicomponent ring-condensation reaction followed by an oxidation. The oxidation by chromium trioxide in acetic acid leads to a symmetrically substituted 4-pyridone, decarboxylation yields the 3,5-unsubstituted derivative.

== Modern variants ==
Acetoacetate can be used instead of diethyl-α-ketoglurate in the presence of indium salts. The use of aniline has also been reported in the original Publication. The product of this reaction shows transoid configuration of the phenyl groups at C-2 and C-6.

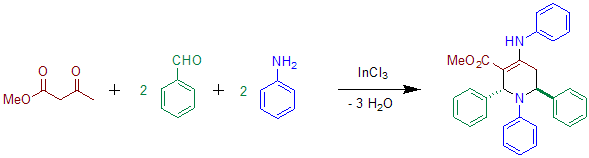
Indium mediated variant

== Natural product synthesis ==
The reaction has been used to prepare precoccinellin, an alkaloid found in certain ladybugs.

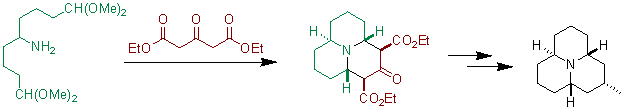
Petrenko-Krischenko type condensation of Precoccinellin precursor

== Applications to coordination chemistry ==
When benzaldehyde is substituted with 2-pyridinecarboxaldehyde the reaction can be used to prepare precursors for bispidone-ligands. Essentially this method is based on two subsequent Petrenko-Kritschenko reactions. These ligands can be used to prepare compounds containing high-valent iron, that are able to oxidize cyclohexane in the presence of hydrogen peroxide.

Preparation of chelating ligands
