= C5H6O5 =

The molecular formula C_{5}H_{6}O_{5} may refer to:

- Dioxalin
- Ketoglutaric acid (disambiguation)
  - alpha-Ketoglutaric acid
  - Acetonedicarboxylic acid (beta-Ketoglutaric acid)
