= Pseudopelletierine =

Chemical compound

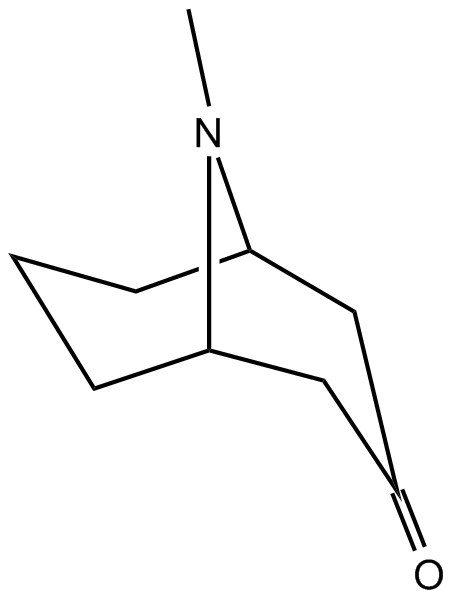

Names
- IUPAC name 9-Methyl-9-azabicyclo[3.3.1]nonan-3-one
- Other names Pseudopunicine; Granatonine; Pseudopelletrierin; Granatan-3-one; Pseudopelletierin; psi-Pelletierine; 9-Methyl-3-granatanone

Identifiers
CAS Number	552-70-5
3D model (JSmol)	Interactive image
ChEBI	CHEBI:8607
ChEMBL	ChEMBL2219893
ChemSpider	21244466
ECHA InfoCard	100.008.202
EC Number	209-021-1
KEGG	C10865
PubChem CID	11096
UNII	USN3FV3Z9X
CompTox Dashboard (EPA)	DTXSID20870606
- InChI: InChI=1S/C9H15NO/c1-10-7-3-2-4-8(10)6-9(11)5-7/h7-8H,2-6H2,1H3 Key: RHWSKVCZXBAWLZ-UHFFFAOYSA-N
- SMILES: CN1C2CCCC1CC(=O)C2

Properties
Chemical formula	C_{9}H_{15}NO
Molar mass	153.225 g·mol^{−1}
Appearance	Colorless (yellows on exposure)
Melting point	54 °C (129 °F; 327 K)
Boiling point	Sublimes at 40 °C (0.3 mmHg)

Hazards
- GHS labelling
Pictograms	(GHS07: Exclamation mark)
Signal word	Warning
Hazard statements	H315, H319, H335
Precautionary statements	P261, P264, P264+P265, P271, P280, P302+P352, P304+P340, P305+P351+P338, P319, P321, P332+P317, P337+P317, P362+P364, P403+P233, P405, P501
- Except where otherwise noted, data are given for materials in their standard state (at 25 °C [77 °F], 100 kPa). verify (what is ?) Infobox references

Pseudopelletierine is the main alkaloid derived from the root-bark of the pomegranate tree (Punica granatum), along with at least three other alkaloids: pelletierine, isopelletierine, and methylpelletierine (C_{9}H_{17}ON), which yield 1.8, 0.52, 0.01, and 0.20 grams per kilogram of raw bark.

It is a homolog of tropinone, and can be synthesized in a manner analogous to the classical Robinson tropinone synthesis, using glutaraldehyde (rather than succinaldehyde), acetonedicarboxylic acid, and methylammonium chloride. It was the starting material for Willstätter's 10-step synthesis of cyclooctatetraene, which was achieved after oxidation and several Hoffman elimination steps.
