= Methylecgonone reductase =

Identifiers
- EC no.: 1.1.1.334

Databases
- IntEnz: IntEnz view
- BRENDA: BRENDA entry
- ExPASy: NiceZyme view
- KEGG: KEGG entry
- MetaCyc: metabolic pathway
- PRIAM: profile
- PDB structures: RCSB PDB PDBe PDBsum
Search
- PMC: articles
- PubMed: articles
- NCBI: proteins

Methylecgonone reductase (EC 1.1.1.334, MecgoR (gene name)) is an enzyme with systematic name ecgonine methyl ester:NADP^{+} oxidoreductase. This enzyme catalyses the following chemical reaction:

Methylecgonine
+ NADP^{+}
H^{+}
H^{+}
2-Carbomethoxytropinone
+ NADPH

The enzyme from the plant Erythroxylum coca participates in the biosynthesis of cocaine.
