= 2-Carbomethoxytropinone =

Names
- IUPAC name Methyl 3-oxotropane-2β-carboxylate
- Systematic IUPAC name Methyl (1R,2R,5S)-8-methyl-3-oxo-8-azabicyclo[3.2.1]octane-2-carboxylate
- Other names Carbomethoxy-tropinone; 2-Carbomethoxy-3-tropinone; Carbmethoxy-tropinone; Methyl 8-methyl-3-oxobicyclo[3.2.1]octane-2-carboxylate; Methyl 8-methyl-3-oxo-8-azabicyclo[3.2.1]octane-4-carboxylate; 2-(Methoxycarbonyl)-3-tropanone

Identifiers
CAS Number	36127-17-0
3D model (JSmol)	Interactive image
ChEBI	CHEBI:67115
ChemSpider	220720
PubChem CID	11127215
CompTox Dashboard (EPA)	DTXSID00957545
- InChI: InChI=1S/C10H15NO3/c1-11-6-3-4-7(11)9(8(12)5-6)10(13)14-2/h6-7,9H,3-5H2, 1-2H3/t6-,7+,9+/m0/s1 Key: WXEMSGQRTGSYOG-LKEWCRSYSA-N
- SMILES: CN1[C@H]2CC[C@@H]1[C@H](C(=O)C2)C(=O)OC

Properties
Chemical formula	C_{10}H_{15}NO_{3}
Molar mass	197.234 g·mol^{−1}
Melting point	104 °C (219 °F; 377 K)
- Except where otherwise noted, data are given for materials in their standard state (at 25 °C [77 °F], 100 kPa). Infobox references

2-Carbomethoxytropinone (2-CMT) is a commonly used organic intermediate in the synthesis of cocaine and its analogues. As of at least 1999 no reaction pathway has been discovered that synthesizes cocaine-like compounds without utilizing the reduction of 2-CMT. The structure of cocaine was discovered by Richard Willstätter in 1898 after he synthesized it from 2-carbomethoxytropinone. Although it was originally believed that 2-CMT in nature was ultimately derived from ornithine and acetic acid, subsequent research has indicated other pathways exist for the biosynthesis of 2-CMT. A β-keto ester, 2-CMT exists in equilibrium with its keto–enol tautomer.

== Synthesis ==
2-CMT (3) can be synthesized from 1,3-acetonedicarboxylate anhydride (1) by methanolysis followed by reaction with methylamine and succinaldehyde.

Synthesis of 2-CMT

== See also ==
- Tropinone
