= Cyclooctatetraene =

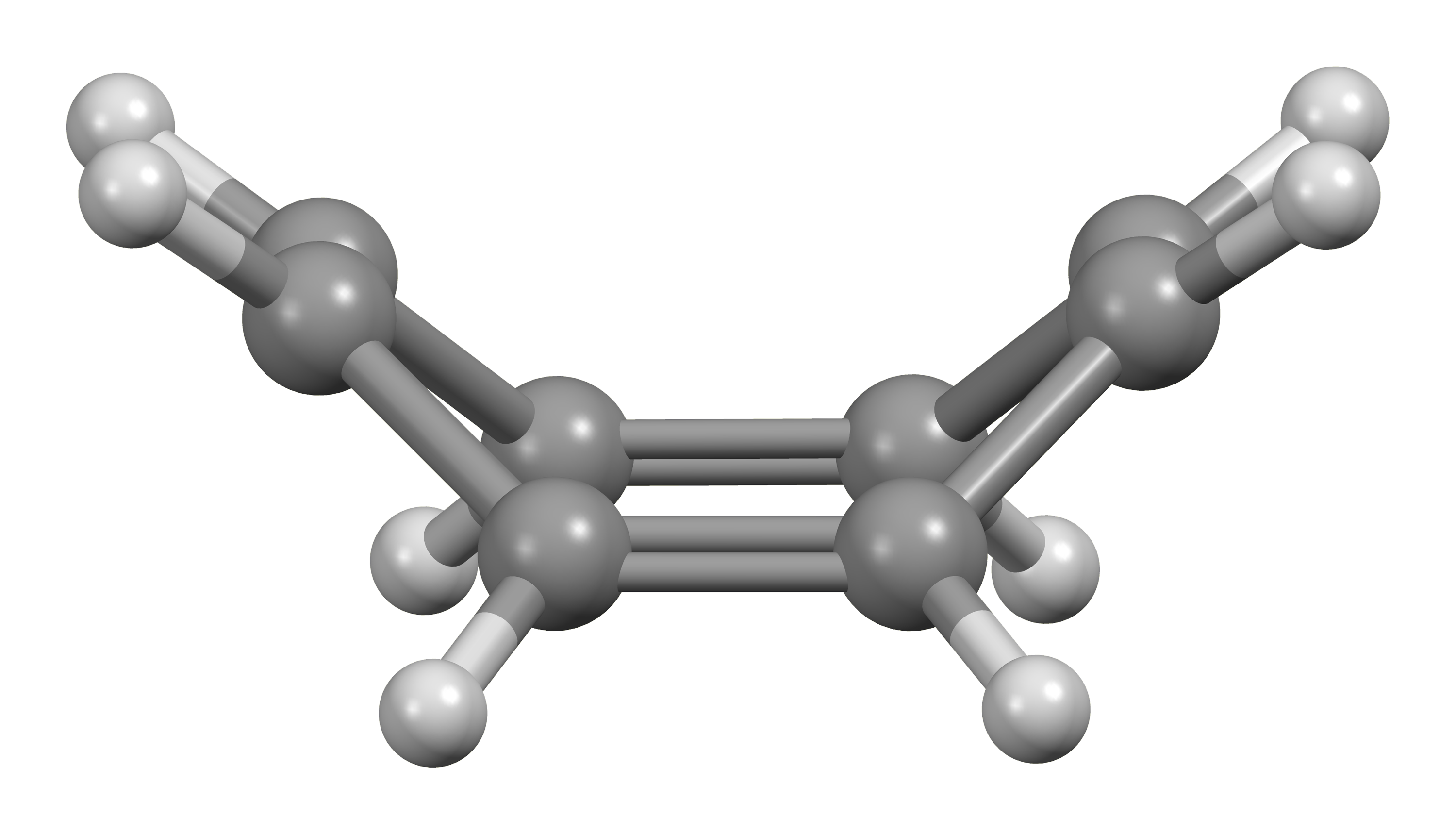

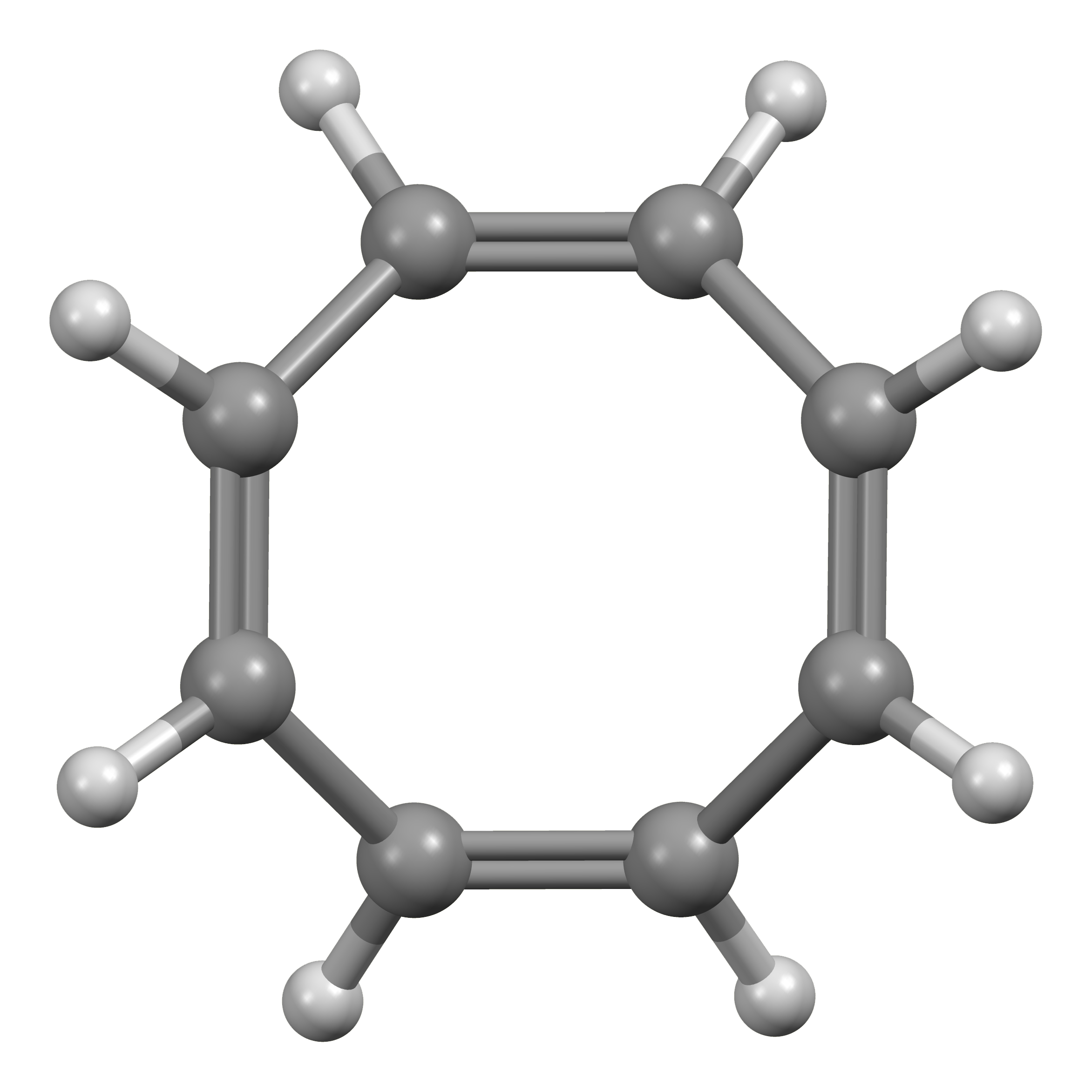

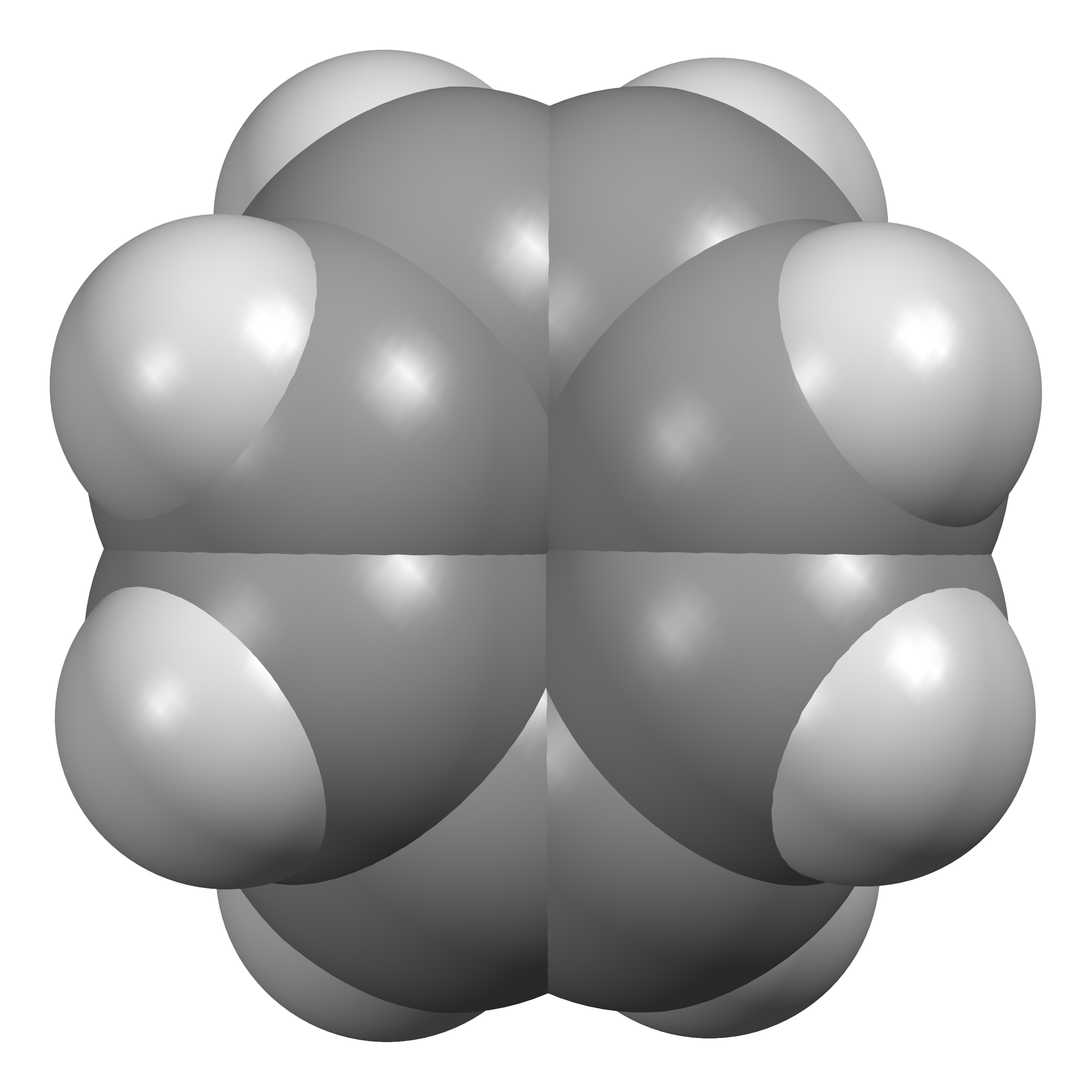

Names
- Preferred IUPAC name Cycloocta-1,3,5,7-tetraene
- Other names [8]Annulene (1Z,3Z,5Z,7Z)-Cycloocta-1,3,5,7-tetraene; 1,3,5,7-Cyclooctatetraene; COT

Identifiers
CAS Number	629-20-9
3D model (JSmol)	Interactive image
ChEBI	CHEBI:47034
ChemSpider	553448
ECHA InfoCard	100.010.074
EC Number	211-080-3
PubChem CID	637866
UNII	AJ19R479CQ
CompTox Dashboard (EPA)	DTXSID9060867
- InChI: InChI=1S/C8H8/c1-2-4-6-8-7-5-3-1/h1-8H/b2-1-,3-1-,4-2-,5-3-,6-4-,7-5-,8-6-,8-7- Key: KDUIUFJBNGTBMD-BONZMOEMSA-N; InChI=1/C8H8/c1-2-4-6-8-7-5-3-1/h1-8H/b2-1-,3-1-,4-2-,5-3-,6-4-,7-5-,8-6-,8-7- Key: KDUIUFJBNGTBMD-BONZMOEMBR
- SMILES: C1=C\C=C/C=C\C=C1

Properties
Chemical formula	C_{8}H_{8}
Molar mass	104.15 g/mol
Appearance	Clear yellow
Density	0.9250 g/cm^{3}, liquid
Melting point	−5 to −3 °C (23 to 27 °F; 268 to 270 K)
Boiling point	142 to 143 °C (288 to 289 °F; 415 to 416 K)
Solubility in water	immiscible
Magnetic susceptibility (χ)	−53.9·10^{−6} cm^{3}/mol

Hazards
- GHS labelling
Pictograms	(GHS02: Flammable) (GHS07: Exclamation mark) (GHS08: Health hazard)
Signal word	Danger
Hazard statements	H225, H304, H315, H319, H335
Precautionary statements	P210, P233, P240, P241, P242, P243, P261, P264, P271, P280, P301+P310, P302+P352, P303+P361+P353, P304+P340, P305+P351+P338, P312, P321, P331, P332+P313, P337+P313, P362, P370+P378, P403+P233, P403+P235, P405, P501
NFPA 704 (fire diamond)	3 3 0
Flash point	−11 °C (12 °F; 262 K)
Autoignition temperature	561 °C (1,042 °F; 834 K)

Related compounds
Related hydrocarbons	Cyclooctane; Tetraphenylene
- Except where otherwise noted, data are given for materials in their standard state (at 25 °C [77 °F], 100 kPa). verify (what is ?) Infobox references

1,3,5,7-Cyclooctatetraene (COT) is an unsaturated derivative of cyclooctane. It is a colorless flammable liquid at room temperature. In contrast to benzene-like rings that are planar and have aromaticity, COT has a non-planar 'tub' conformation, which prevents all of the π orbitals from forming a single conjugated system. It is therefore nonaromatic, possessing significant polyene character and undergoing many reactions that benzene rings will not. Cyclooctatetraenide anion, the dianionic derivative of COT, is a aromatic planar structure used as a ligand in organometallic complexes.

== History ==
1,3,5,7-Cyclooctatetraene was initially synthesized by Richard Willstätter in Munich in 1905 using pseudopelletierine as the starting material and the Hofmann elimination as the key transformation:

Willstätter noted that the compound did not exhibit the expected aromaticity. Between 1939 and 1943, chemists throughout the US unsuccessfully attempted to synthesize COT. They rationalized their lack of success with the conclusion that Willstätter had not actually synthesized the compound but instead its isomer, styrene. Willstätter responded to these reviews in his autobiography, where he noted that the American chemists were 'untroubled' by the reduction of his cyclooctatetraene to cyclooctane (a reaction impossible for styrene). During World War II, Walter Reppe at BASF Ludwigshafen developed a simple, one-step synthesis of cyclooctatetraene from acetylene, providing material identical to that prepared by Willstätter. Any remaining doubts on the accuracy of Willstätter's original synthesis were resolved when Arthur C. Cope and co-workers at MIT reported, in 1947, a complete repetition of the Willstätter synthesis, step by step, using the originally reported techniques. They obtained the same cyclooctatetraene, and they subsequently reported modern spectral characterization of many of the intermediate products, again confirming the accuracy of Willstätter's original work. However, the freezing temperature of the product was different from pure COT, and the authors interpreted it as contamination with about 30% of styrene.

== Structure and bonding ==
Cyclooctatetraene in its native "tub-shaped" conformation

Early studies demonstrated that COT did not display the chemistry of an aromatic compound. Then, early electron diffraction experiments concluded that the C-C bond distances were identical. However, X-ray diffraction data from H. S. Kaufman demonstrated cyclooctatetraene to adopt several conformations and to contain two distinct C–C bond distances. This result indicated that COT is an annulene with fixed alternating single and double C-C bonds.

In its normal state, cyclooctatetraene is non-planar and adopts a tub conformation with angles C=C−C = 126.1° and C=C−H = 117.6°. The point group of cyclooctatetraene is D_{2d}.

In its planar transition state, the D_{4h} transitional state is more stable than the D_{8h} transitional state due to the Jahn–Teller effect.

== Synthesis ==
Richard Willstätter's original synthesis (4 consecutive elimination reactions on a cyclooctane framework) gives relatively low chemical yields. Reppe's synthesis of cyclooctatetraene, which involves treating acetylene at high pressure with a warm mixture of nickel cyanide and calcium carbide, was higher yielding (near 90%) but suffered from high toxicity.

COT can also be prepared by photolysis of barrelene, one of its structural isomers, the reaction proceeding via another isolable isomer, semibullvalene. COT can also be synthesised more conveniently from 1,5-cyclooctadiene in a moderate yield. Because COT is unstable and easily forms explosive organic peroxides, a small amount of hydroquinone is usually added to commercially available material. Testing for peroxides is advised when using a previously opened bottle; white crystals around the neck of the bottle may be composed of the peroxide, which may explode when mechanically disturbed.

=== Derivatives ===
COT derivatives can also be synthesised by way of semibullvalene intermediates. In the sequence illustrated below, octaethylcyclooctatetraene (C_{8}Et_{8}) is formed by thermal isomerisation of octaethylsemibullvalene, itself formed by copper(I) bromide mediated cyclodimerisation of 1,2,3,4-tetraethyl-1,4-dilithio-1,3-butadiene.

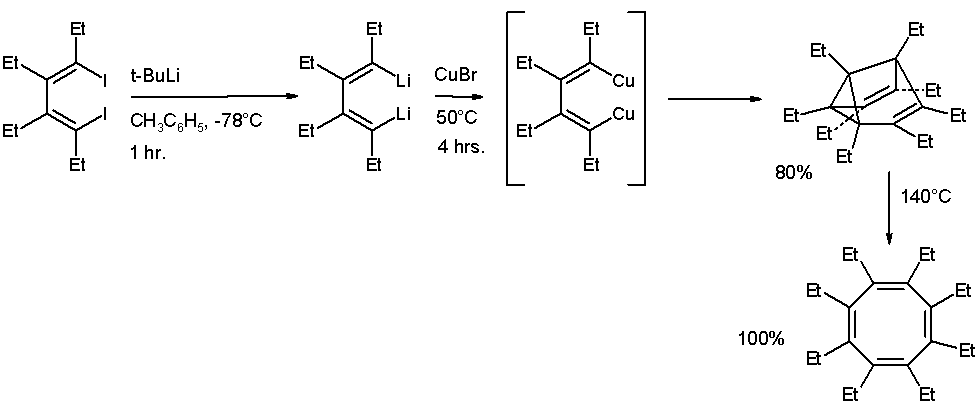

== Natural occurrence ==
Cyclooctatetraene has been isolated from certain fungi.

== Reactions ==
The π bonds in COT react as usual for olefins, rather than as aromatic ring systems. Mono- and polyepoxides can be generated by reaction of COT with peroxy acids or with dimethyldioxirane. Various other addition reactions are also known. Furthermore, polyacetylene can be synthesized via the ring-opening polymerization of cyclooctatetraene. COT itself—and also analogs with side-chains—have been used as metal ligands and in sandwich compounds.

Cyclooctatetraene also undergoes rearrangement reactions to form aromatic ring systems. For instance, oxidation with aqueous mercury(II) sulfate forms phenylacetaldehyde and photochemical rearrangement of its monoepoxide forms benzofuran.

== Cyclooctatetraenide as a ligand and ligand precursor ==
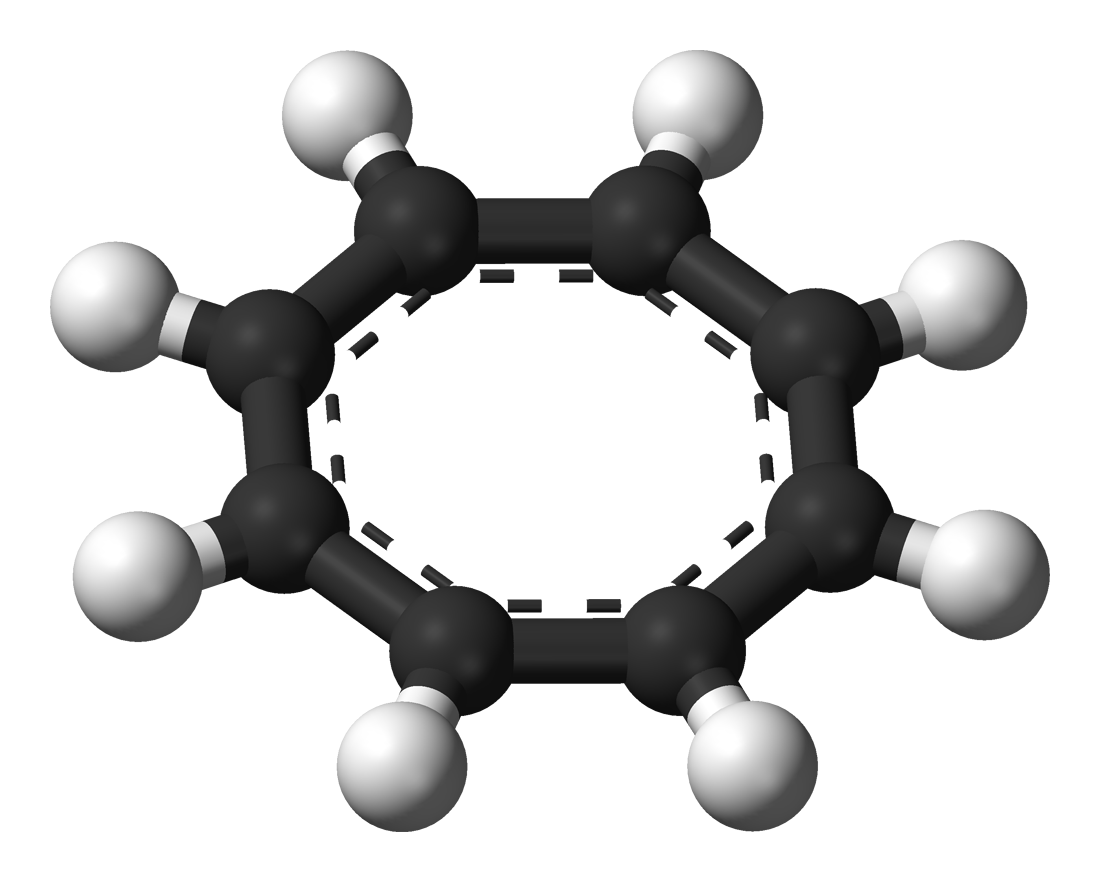
Ball-and-stick model of COT^{2−}

COT readily reacts with potassium metal to form the salt K_{2}COT, which contains the dianion C_{8}H^{2−}_{8}. The dianion is planar, octagonal, and aromatic with a Hückel electron count of 10.

Cyclooctatetraene forms organometallic complexes with some metals, including yttrium, lanthanides, and actinides. The sandwich compound uranocene (U(COT)_{2}) features two η^{8}-COT ligands. In bis(cyclooctatetraene)iron (Fe(COT)_{2}) one COT is η^{6} and the other is η^{4}. (Cyclooctatetraene)iron tricarbonyl features η^{4}-COT. The room-temperature ^{1}H NMR spectra of these iron complexes are singlets, indicative of fluxionality.

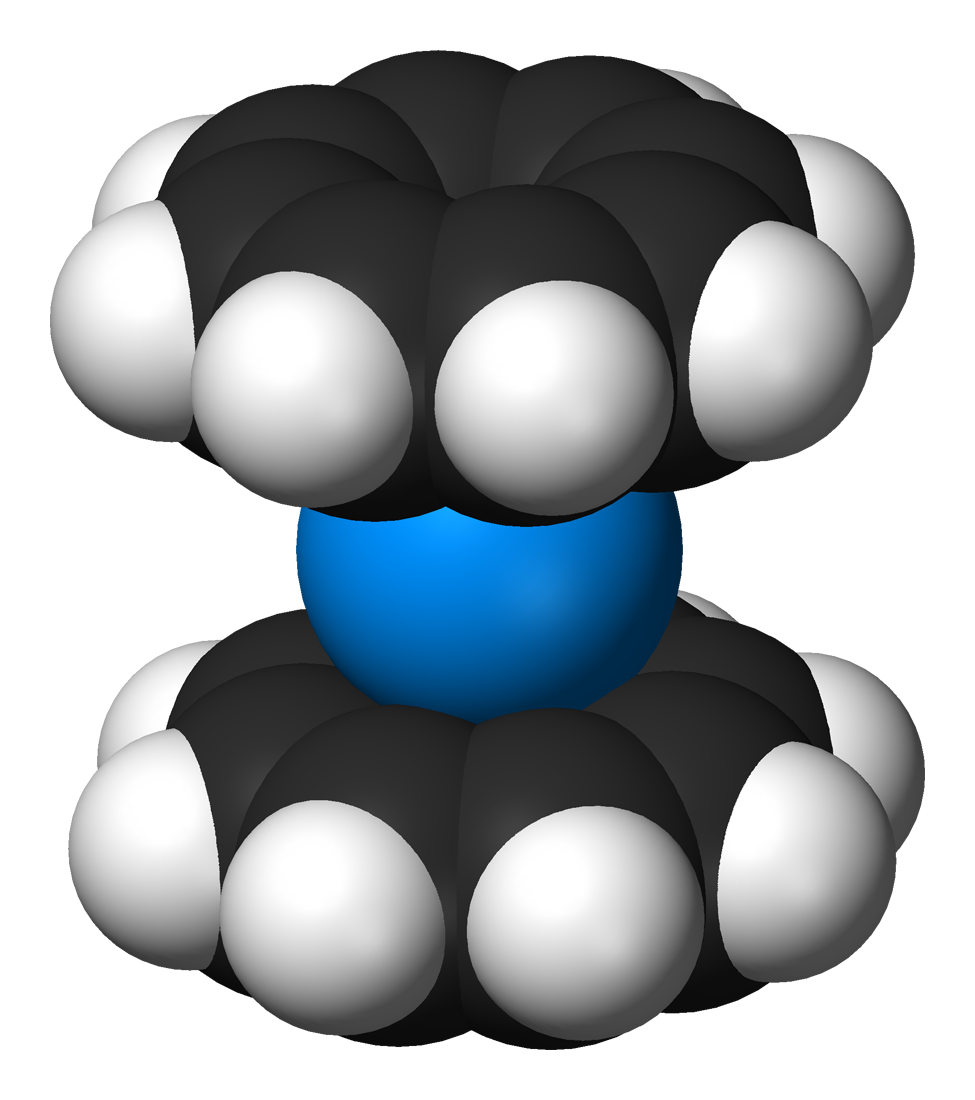
Uranocene, a sandwich compound containing two COT^{2−} rings.

Cyclooctatetraene is chlorinated to give a [4.2.0]-bicyclic compound, which reacts further with dimethyl acetylenedicarboxylate in a Diels–Alder reaction (DA). Retro-DA at 200 °C releases cis-dichlorocyclobutene. This compound reacts with diiron nonacarbonyl to give cyclobutadieneiron tricarbonyl.

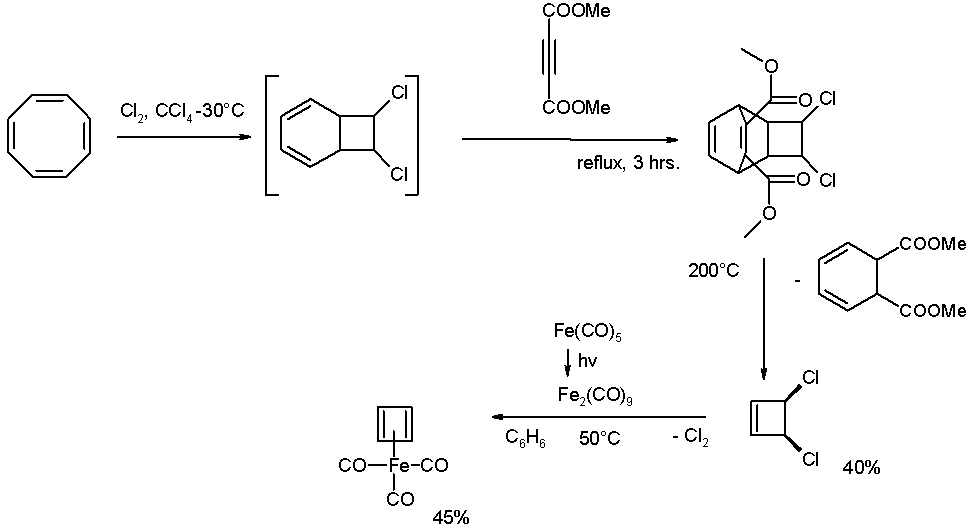

== See also ==
- Other annulenes:
  - Cyclobutadiene
  - Benzene
  - Cyclodecapentaene
- COT structural isomers:
  - Barrelene
  - Heptafulvene
  - Semibullvalene
- Azocine, nitrogen instead of a CH moiety
- Pentalene, two fewer hydrogens
