= Tetraphenylene =

- Skeletal formula

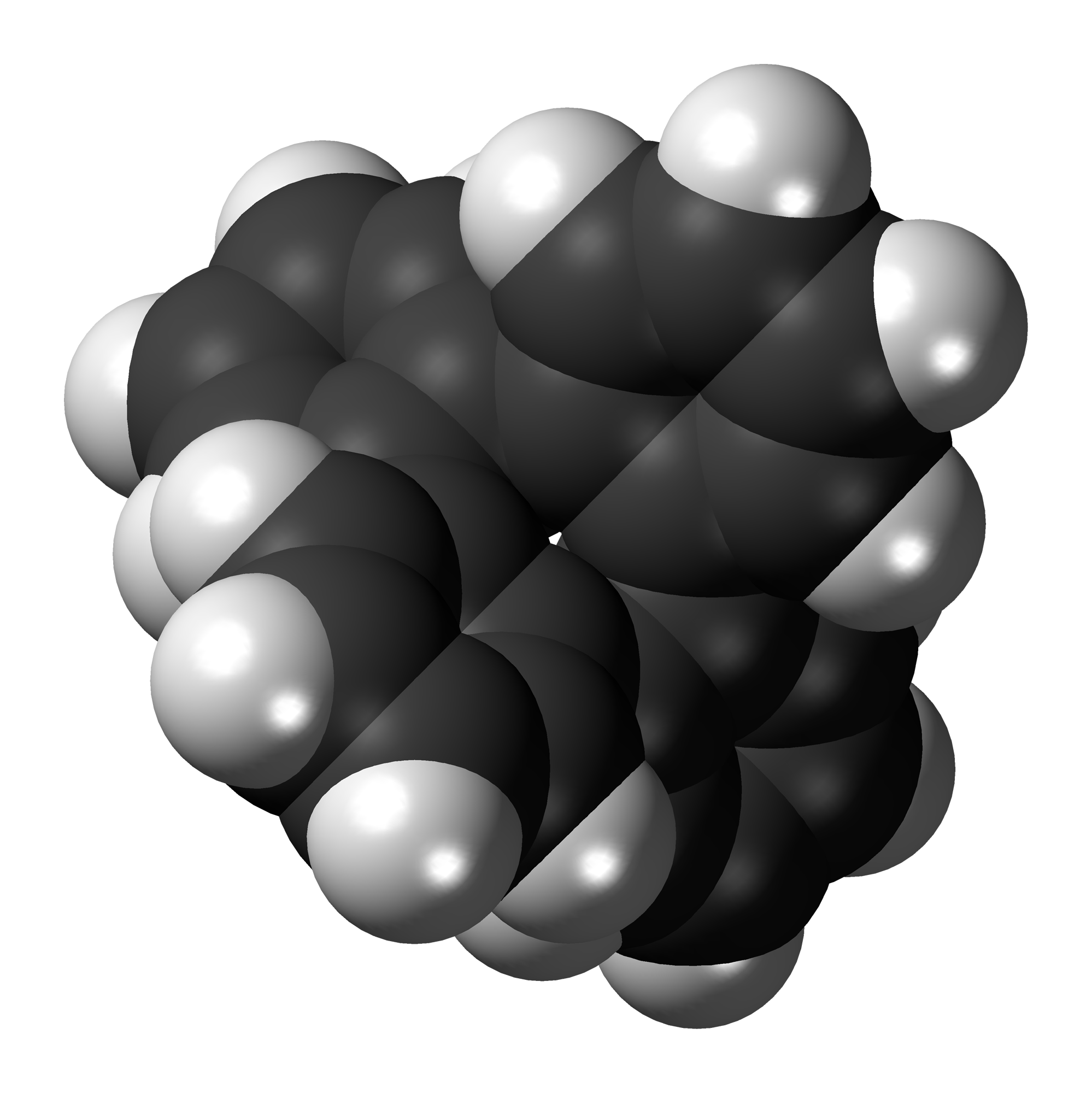
- Space-filling model

Names
- Preferred IUPAC name Tetraphenylene

Identifiers
CAS Number	212-74-8
3D model (JSmol)	Interactive image
ChemSpider	2006983
PubChem CID	2724868
UNII	887R8CZW6Z
- InChI: InChI=1S/C24H16/c1-2-10-18-17(9-1)19-11-3-4-13-21(19)23-15-7-8-16-24(23)22-14-6-5-12-20(18)22/h1-16H/b19-17-,20-18-,23-21-,24-22- Key: KTQYWNARBMKMCX-LEYBOLSUSA-N
- SMILES: C1=CC=C2C(=C1)C3=CC=CC=C3C4=CC=CC=C4C5=CC=CC=C25

Properties
Chemical formula	C_{24}H_{16}
Molar mass	304.39 g/mol
Density	1.19 g/cm3
Melting point	232 to 235 °C (450 to 455 °F; 505 to 508 K)
Boiling point	577.6 °C (1,071.7 °F; 850.8 K) at 760 mmHg

Hazards
Flash point	297.9 °C (568.2 °F; 571.0 K)

Structure
Point group	D_{2d}
Dipole moment	0 D
- Except where otherwise noted, data are given for materials in their standard state (at 25 °C [77 °F], 100 kPa). verify (what is ?) Infobox references

Tetraphenylene is an organic compound, solid at room temperature, with the chemical formula C_{24}H_{16}. It is a member of the unsaturated polycyclic hydrocarbons class of compounds and a tetramer of benzyne.

== See also ==
- Cyclooctatetraene
