= Ecgonidine =

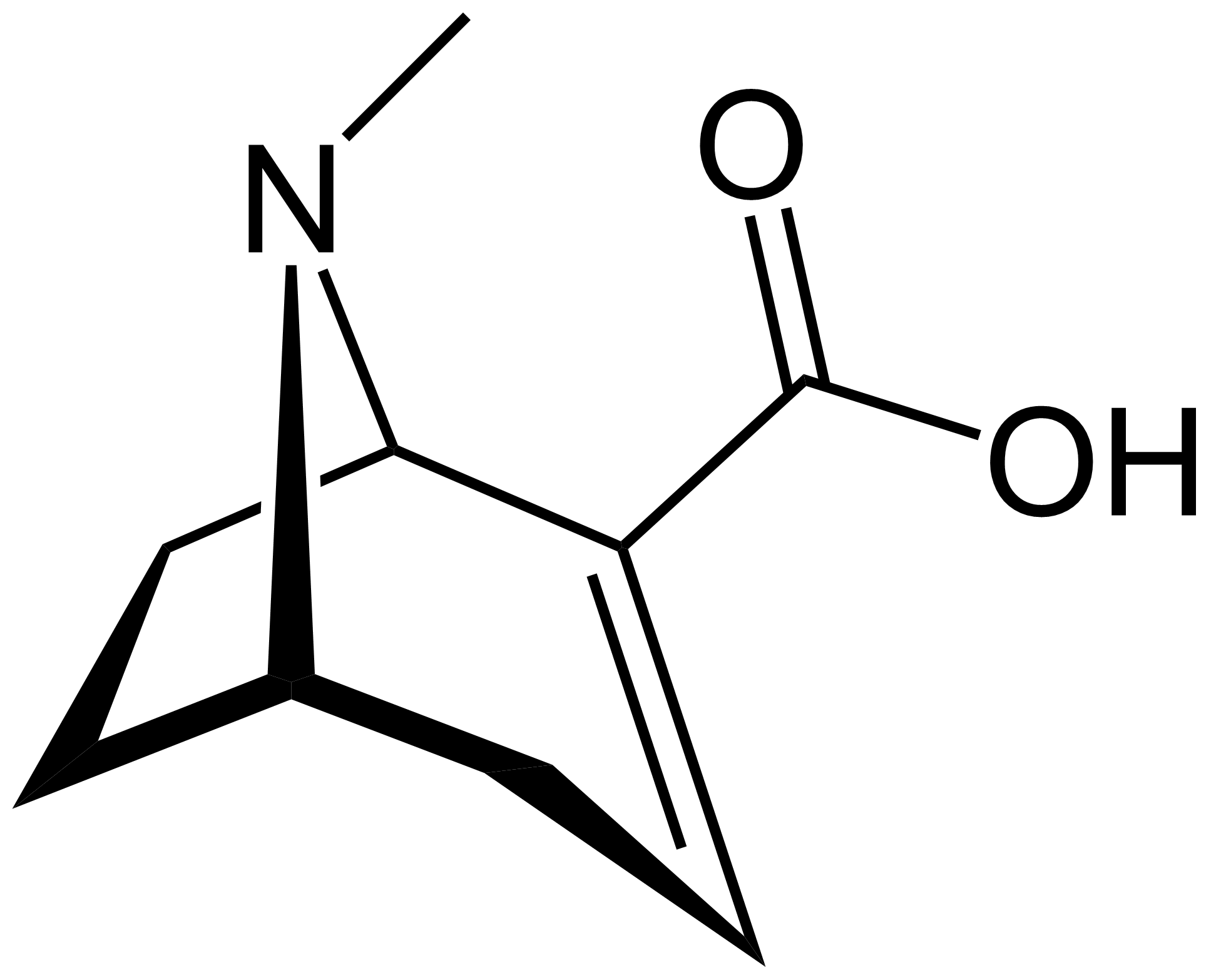

Names
- IUPAC name Trop-2-ene-2-carboxylic acid
- Systematic IUPAC name (1R,5S)-8-Methyl-8-azabicyclo[3.2.1]oct-2-ene-2-carboxylic acid
- Other names Anhydroecgonine

Identifiers
CAS Number	484-93-5
3D model (JSmol)	Interactive image; Interactive image
ChemSpider	16735787
ECHA InfoCard	100.006.919
PubChem CID	101709
UNII	9H2C60Y82I
CompTox Dashboard (EPA)	DTXSID00901169 DTXSID60897574, DTXSID00901169
- InChI: InChI=1S/C8H11NO2/c10-8(11)6-3-1-5-2-4-7(6)9-5/h3,5,7,9H,1-2,4H2,(H,10,11)/t5-,7-/m1/s1 Key: ZAZOGAHQAWUCJK-IYSWYEEDSA-N; InChI=1/C8H11NO2/c10-8(11)6-3-1-5-2-4-7(6)9-5/h3,5,7,9H,1-2,4H2,(H,10,11)/t5-,7-/m1/s1 Key: ZAZOGAHQAWUCJK-IYSWYEEDBT
- SMILES: CN1C2CCC1C(=CC2)C(=O)O; OC(=O)\C2=C\C[C@@H]1CC[C@H]2N1

Properties
Chemical formula	C_{9}H_{13}NO_{2}
Molar mass	167.205 g·mol^{−1}
- Except where otherwise noted, data are given for materials in their standard state (at 25 °C [77 °F], 100 kPa). verify (what is ?) Infobox references

Ecgonidine (anhydroecgonine) is an alkaloid related to ecgonine and cocaine. It has a structure with a cycloheptene ring, with a nitrogen bridge, and a carboxylic acid side chain.

Methylecgonidine is produced by pyrolysis in the process of smoking crack cocaine, and then subsequently metabolised to ecgonidine, and so these two compounds can be tested for as a specific biomarker for crack cocaine use. Ecgonidine is formed as a metabolite of methylecgonidine, and so the relative concentrations of the two compounds can be used to gauge how recently crack cocaine was smoked. If levels of methylecgonidine are higher, then the drug was smoked recently; however after a longer time period mainly ecgonidine will be present. Ecgonidine has a half-life in the body of around 94–137 minutes, and so can be used to detect use of crack cocaine up to 8–10 hours after the drug is consumed.

== See also ==
- Coca alkaloids
- Ecgonine
- Tropacocaine
