= Tropinone =

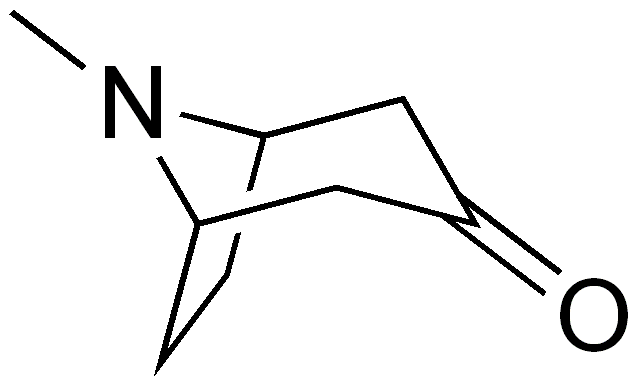

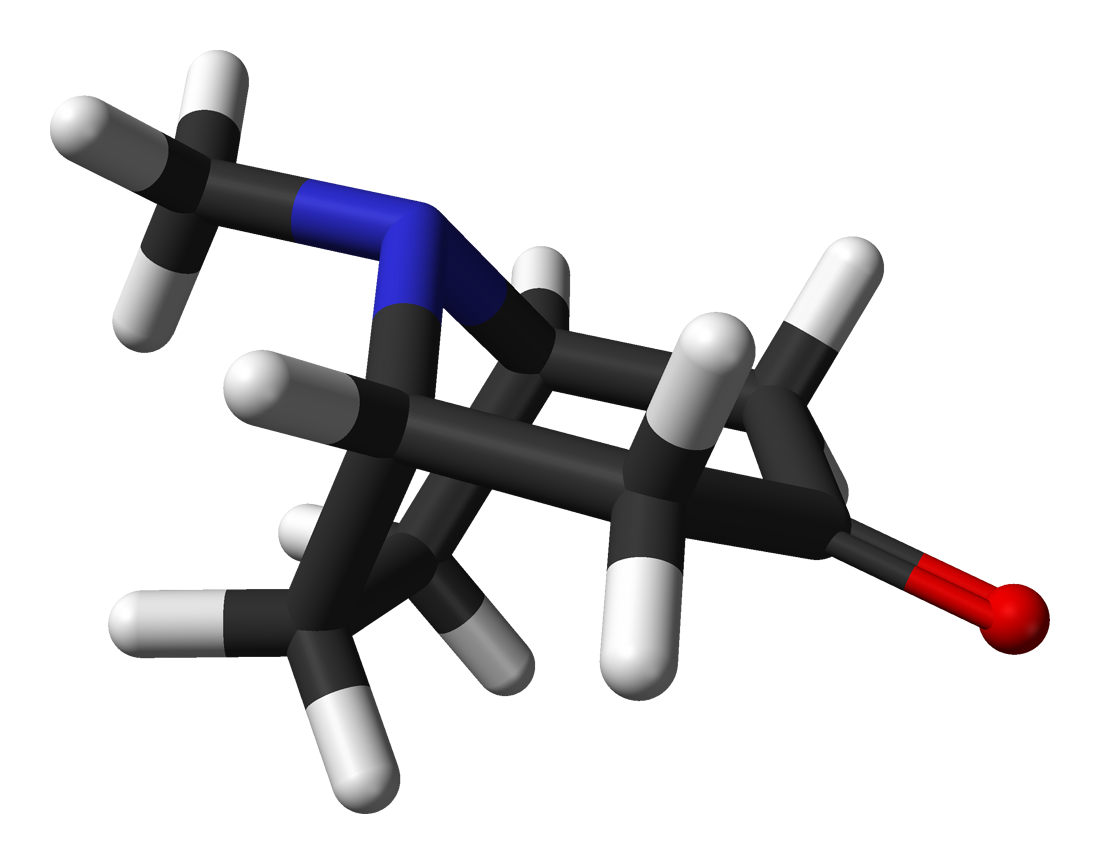

Names
- IUPAC name 8-Methyl-8-azabicyclo[3.2.1]octan-3-one
- Other names 3-Tropinone

Identifiers
CAS Number	532-24-1
3D model (JSmol)	Interactive image
ChEBI	CHEBI:16656
ChemSpider	393722
DrugBank	DB01874
ECHA InfoCard	100.007.756
PubChem CID	446337
UNII	2A8CC8KA5F
CompTox Dashboard (EPA)	DTXSID30862133
- InChI: InChI=1S/C8H13NO/c1-9-6-2-3-7(9)5-8(10)4-6/h6-7H,2-5H2,1H3/t6-,7+ Key: QQXLDOJGLXJCSE-KNVOCYPGSA-N; InChI=1S/C8H13NO/c1-9-6-2-3-7(9)5-8(10)4-6/h6-7H,2-5H2,1H3/t6-,7+ Key: QQXLDOJGLXJCSE-KNVOCYPGBG; Key: QQXLDOJGLXJCSE-KNVOCYPGSA-N
- SMILES: CN1[C@@H]2CC[C@H]1CC(=O)C2

Properties
Chemical formula	C_{8}H_{13}NO
Molar mass	139.195 g/mol
Appearance	Brown solid
Melting point	42.5 °C (108.5 °F; 315.6 K)
Boiling point	(decomposes)

Hazards
- GHS labelling
Pictograms	(GHS05: Corrosive) (GHS07: Exclamation mark)
Signal word	Danger
Hazard statements	H302, H314
NFPA 704 (fire diamond)	2 1 0
- Except where otherwise noted, data are given for materials in their standard state (at 25 °C [77 °F], 100 kPa). verify (what is ?) Infobox references

Tropinone is an alkaloid, famously synthesised in 1917 by Robert Robinson as a synthetic precursor to atropine, a scarce commodity during World War I. Tropinone and the alkaloids cocaine and atropine all share the same tropane core structure. Its corresponding conjugate acid at pH 7.3 major species is known as tropiniumone.

== Synthesis ==
The first synthesis of tropinone was by Richard Willstätter in 1901. It started from the seemingly related cycloheptanone, but required many steps to introduce the nitrogen bridge; the overall yield for the synthesis path is only 0.75%. Willstätter had previously synthesized cocaine from tropinone, in what was the first synthesis and elucidation of the structure of cocaine.

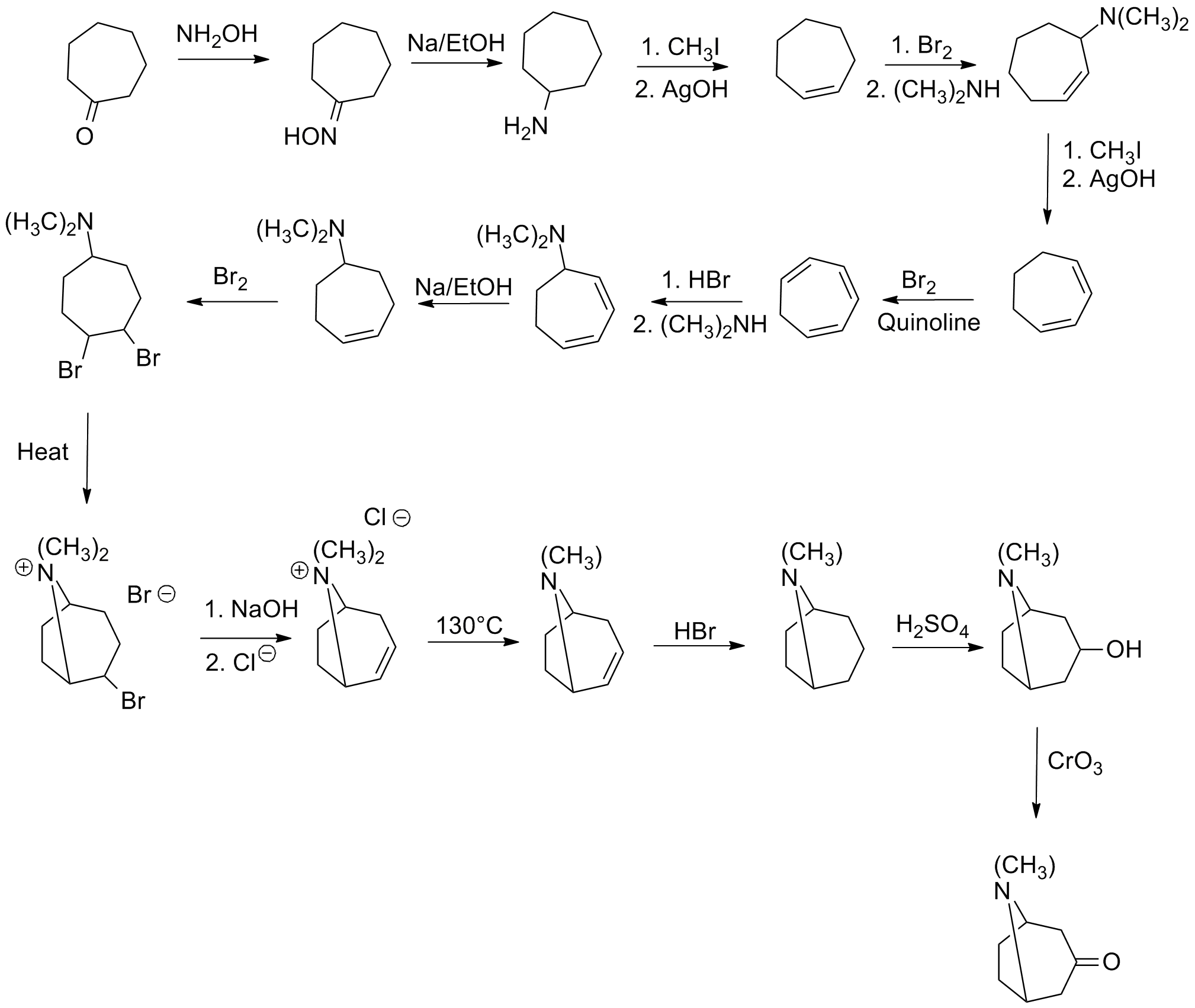
Willstatter tropinone synthesis

=== Robinson's "double Mannich" reaction ===
The 1917 synthesis by Robinson is considered a classic in total synthesis due to its simplicity and biomimetic approach. Tropinone is a bicyclic molecule, but the reactants used in its preparation are fairly simple: succinaldehyde, methylamine and acetonedicarboxylic acid (or even acetone). The synthesis is a good example of a biomimetic reaction or biogenetic-type synthesis because biosynthesis makes use of the same building blocks. It also demonstrates a tandem reaction in a one-pot synthesis. Furthermore, the yield of the synthesis was 17% and with subsequent improvements exceeded 90%.

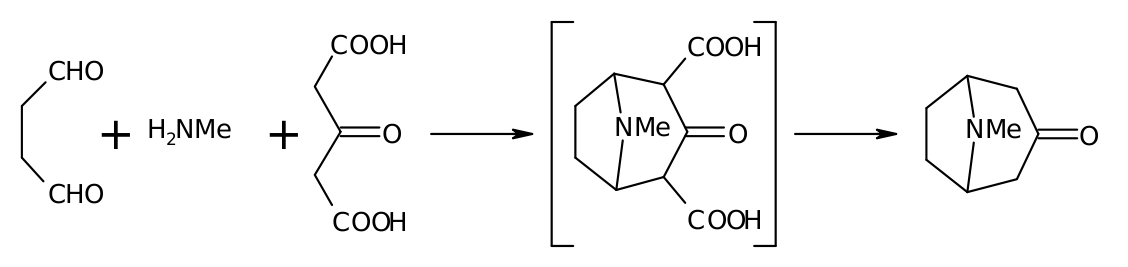

This "double Mannich" is the result of two subsequent Mannich reactions, with each one forming one side of the molecule. It is not unique in this regard, as others have also attempted it in piperidine synthesis.

In place of acetone, acetonedicarboxylic acid is known as the synthetic equivalent, the 1,3-dicarboxylic acid groups are activating groups to facilitate the ring forming reactions. The calcium salt is there as a buffer as it is claimed that higher yields are possible if the reaction is conducted at "physiological pH".

=== Reaction mechanism ===
The main features apparent from the reaction sequence below are:

1. Nucleophilic addition of methylamine to succinaldehyde, followed by loss of water to create an imine
2. Intramolecular addition of the imine to the second aldehyde unit and first ring closure
3. Intermolecular Mannich reaction of the enolate of acetone dicarboxylate
4. New enolate formation and new imine formation with loss of water for
5. Second intramolecular Mannich reaction and second ring closure
6. Loss of 2 carboxylic groups to tropinone

Some authors have actually tried to retain one of the CO_{2}H groups.

CO_{2}R-tropinone has 4 stereoisomers, although the corresponding ecgonidine alkyl ester has only a pair of enantiomers.

=== From cycloheptanone ===
IBX dehydrogenation (oxidation) of cycloheptanone (suberone) to 2,6-cycloheptadienone [1192-93-4] followed by reaction with an amine is versatile a way of forming tropinones. The mechanism evoked is clearly delineated to be a double Michael reaction (i.e. conjugate addition).

=== Reduction of tropinone ===
The reduction of tropinone is mediated by NADPH-dependent reductase enzymes, which have been characterized in multiple plant species. These plant species all contain two types of the reductase enzymes, tropinone reductase I and tropinone reductase II. TRI produces tropine and TRII produces pseudotropine. Due to differing kinetic and pH/activity characteristics of the enzymes and by the 25-fold higher activity of TRI over TRII, the majority of the tropinone reduction is from TRI to form tropine.

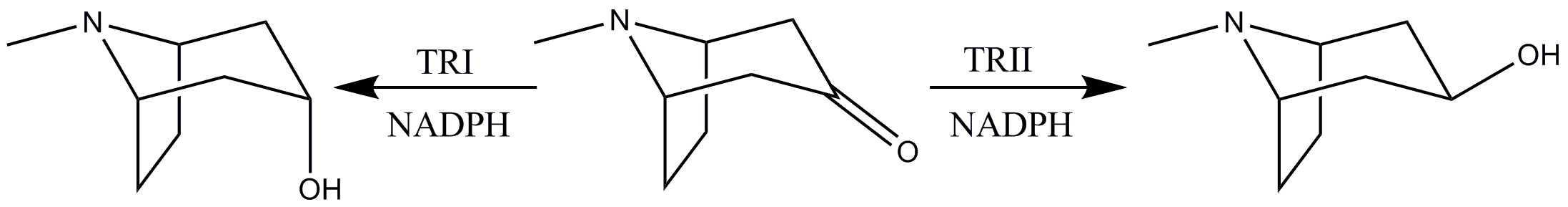
Reduction of tropinone

== See also ==
- Benztropine
- Daturaolone
- 2-Carbomethoxytropinone (2-CMT) an intermediate in the creation of ecgonine cocaine analogues
- Ecgonidine
