= Crack cocaine =

Form of the drug cocaine

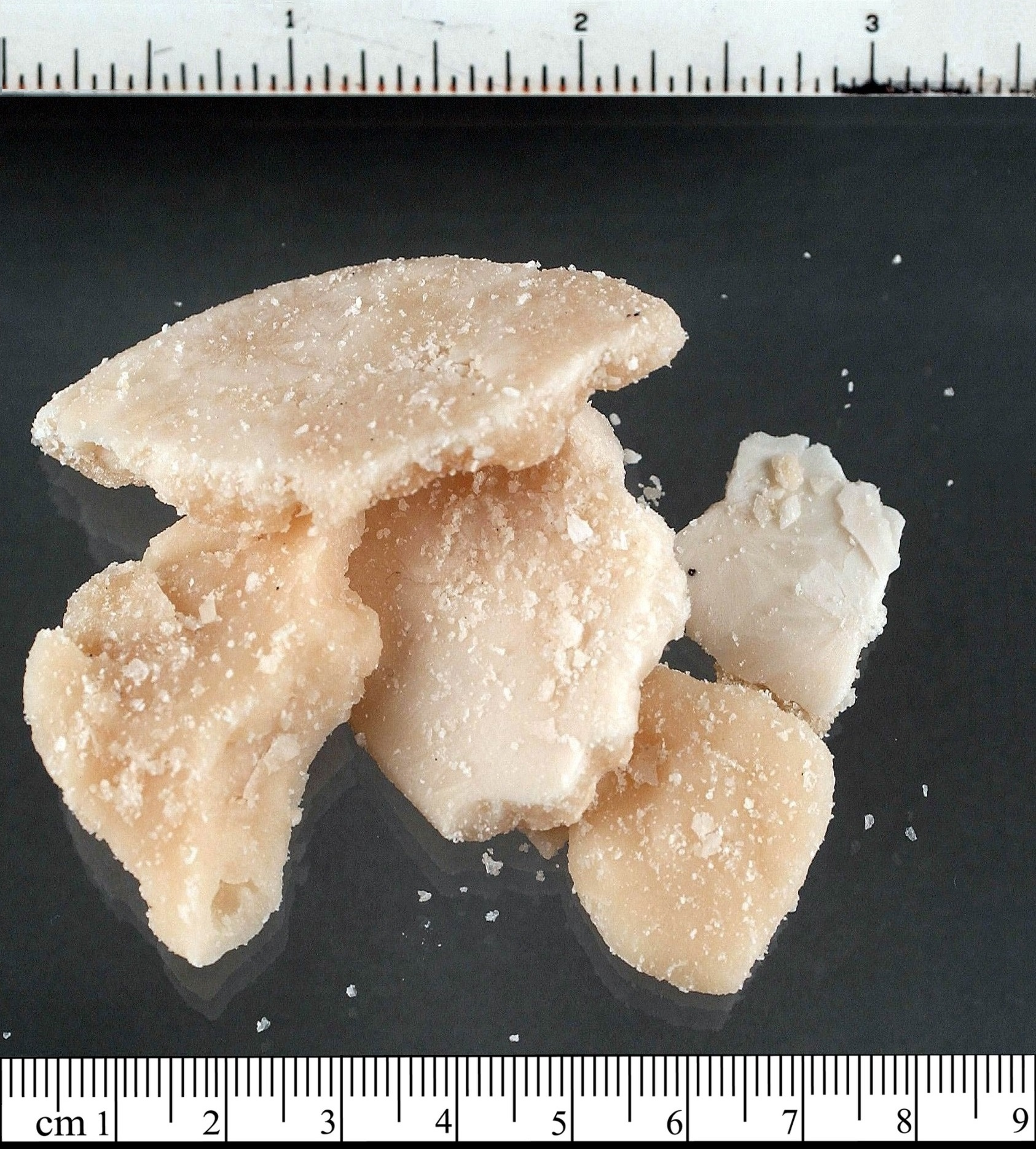
- Sample of crack cocaine

Clinical data
- Other names: Cocaine freebase, rock, crack
- Dependence liability: High
- Addiction liability: High
- Routes of administration: Smoking, intravenous
- Drug class: Stimulant

Legal status
- Legal status: CA: Schedule I; UK: Class A; US: Schedule II (cocaine); UN: Schedule I; Illegal in most countries

Pharmacokinetic data
- Metabolism: Liver
- Excretion: Kidney

Crack cocaine, commonly known simply as crack, and also known as rock, is a free base form of the stimulant cocaine that can be smoked. Crack offers a short, intense high to smokers. The Manual of Adolescent Substance Abuse Treatment calls it the most addictive form of cocaine.

Crack cocaine first saw widespread use as a recreational drug in primarily impoverished neighborhoods in New York City, Philadelphia, Baltimore, Washington, D.C., Los Angeles, San Francisco and Miami in late 1984 and 1985. This rapid increase in use and availability was named the "crack epidemic", which began to wane in the 1990s.

The drug creates quick effects when smoked. Crack cocaine takes five to ten seconds before symptoms are shown. Short-term effects of the drug include euphoria, hyper-focus, sociability, cardiovascular hypertension, dilated pupils, hyperthermia, vertigo, tremors, and restlessness. Repeated use can lead to respiratory failure, seizures, CNS depression, and cardiomyopathy. The drug also tends to cause users to develop paranoia, delusions of bugs under their skin, and in high doses, psychosis.

Crack cocaine and salt-based cocaine are both classified by the Drug Enforcement Administration (DEA) as Schedule II drugs under the Controlled Substances Act.

== Terminology ==
The origin of the name "crack" comes from the "crackling" sound that is produced when the cocaine and its impurities (i.e. water, sodium bicarbonate (baking soda)) are heated past the point of vaporization.

It is also commonly called "rock" on the street, a name that comes from its physical appearance after processing. When bulk quantities of powdered cocaine are mixed with baking soda or ammonia and water, then heated, it forms small, hard, solid crystals or pellets that resemble rocks.

== Chemistry ==
As the name implies, "freebase" is the base form of cocaine, as opposed to the salt form. It is practically insoluble in water whereas hydrochloride salt is water-soluble.

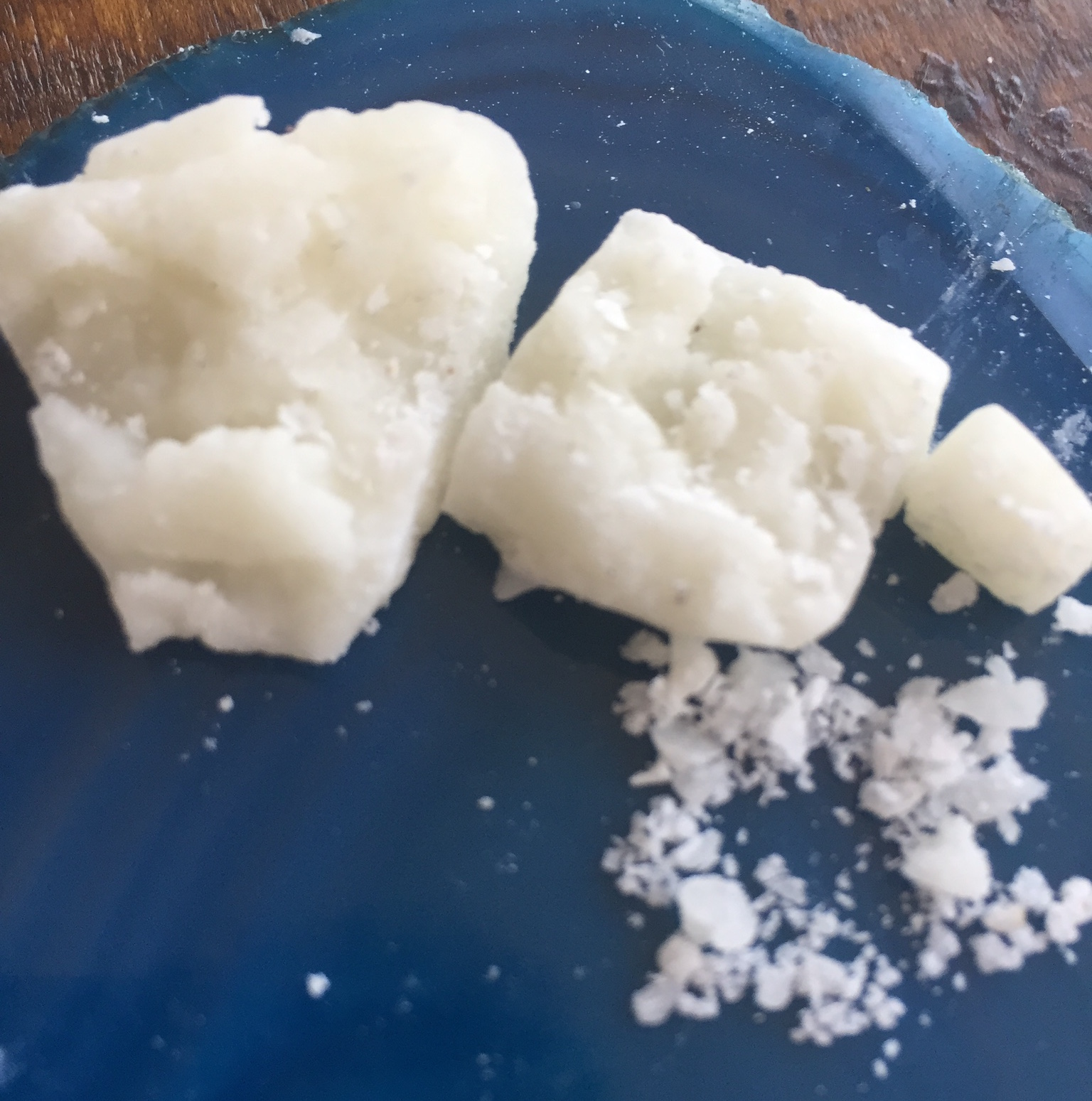
Two grams of crack cocaine

Smoking freebase cocaine has the additional effect of releasing methylecgonidine into the user's system due to the pyrolysis of the substance (a side effect which insufflating or injecting powder cocaine does not create). Some research suggests that smoking freebase cocaine can be even more cardiotoxic than other routes of administration because of methylecgonidine's effects on lung tissue and liver tissue.

Pure cocaine is prepared by neutralizing its compounding salt with an alkaline solution, which will precipitate non-polar basic cocaine. It is further refined through aqueous-solvent liquid–liquid extraction.

Purer forms of crack resemble off-white, jagged-edged "rocks" of a hard, brittle plastic, with a slightly higher density than candle wax. Like cocaine in other forms, crack rock acts as a local anesthetic, numbing the tongue or mouth only where directly placed. Purer forms of crack will sink in water and melt at the edges when near a flame (crack vaporizes at 90 °C, 194 °F).

Crack cocaine sold on the streets may be adulterated (or "cut") with other substances mimicking the appearance of crack to increase bulk. Use of toxic adulterants such as levamisole, a drug used to treat parasitic worm infections, has been documented.

=== Synthesis ===
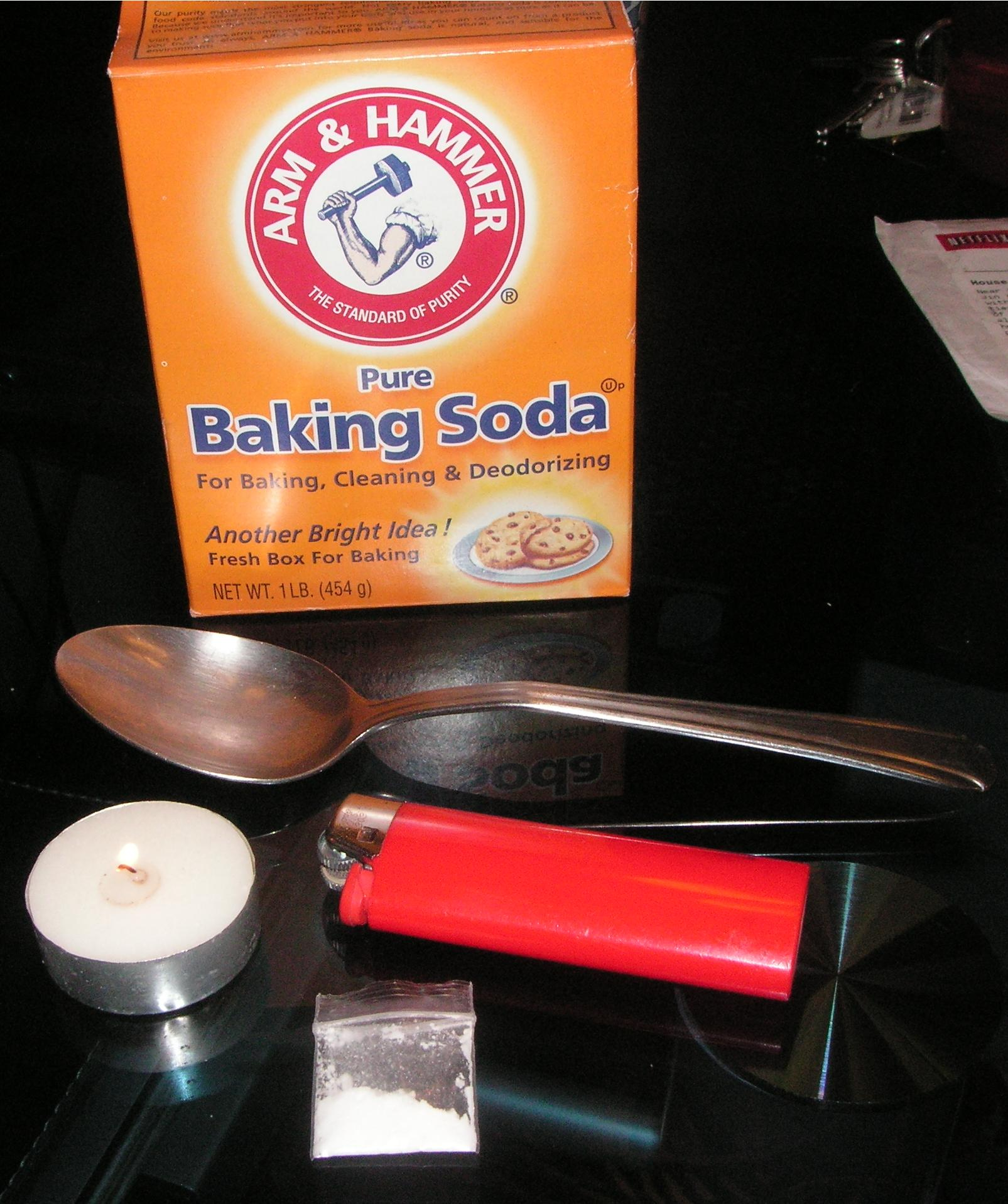
For cocaine (in plastic bag at bottom) to be converted to crack, supplies are needed: baking soda, a commonly used base in making crack, metal spoon, tealight, and cigarette lighter. The spoon is held over the heat source to "cook" the cocaine into crack.

Sodium bicarbonate (NaHCO_{3}, common baking soda) is a base used in the preparation of crack, although other weak bases may substitute for it.

The net reaction when using sodium bicarbonate is

Coc-H^{+}Cl^{−} + NaHCO_{3} → Coc + H_{2}O + CO_{2} + NaCl

With ammonium bicarbonate:

Coc-H^{+}Cl^{−} + NH_{4}HCO_{3} → Coc + NH_{4}Cl + CO_{2} + H_{2}O

With ammonium carbonate:

2(Coc-H^{+}Cl^{−}) + (NH_{4})_{2}CO_{3} → 2 Coc + 2 NH_{4}Cl + CO_{2} + H_{2}O

Crack cocaine is frequently purchased already in rock form, although it is not uncommon for some users to "wash up" or "cook" powder cocaine into crack themselves. This process is frequently done with baking soda (sodium bicarbonate), water, and a spoon. Once mixed and heated, the bicarbonate reacts with the hydrochloride of the powder cocaine, forming free base cocaine and carbonic acid (H_{2}CO_{3}) in a reversible acid-base reaction. The heating accelerates the degradation of carbonic acid into carbon dioxide (CO_{2}) and water. Loss of CO_{2} prevents the reaction from reversing back to cocaine hydrochloride. Free base cocaine separates as an oily layer, floating on the top of the now leftover aqueous phase. It is at this point that the oil is picked up rapidly, usually with a pin or long thin object. This pulls the oil up and spins it, allowing air to set and dry the oil, and allows the maker to roll the oil into the rock-like shape.

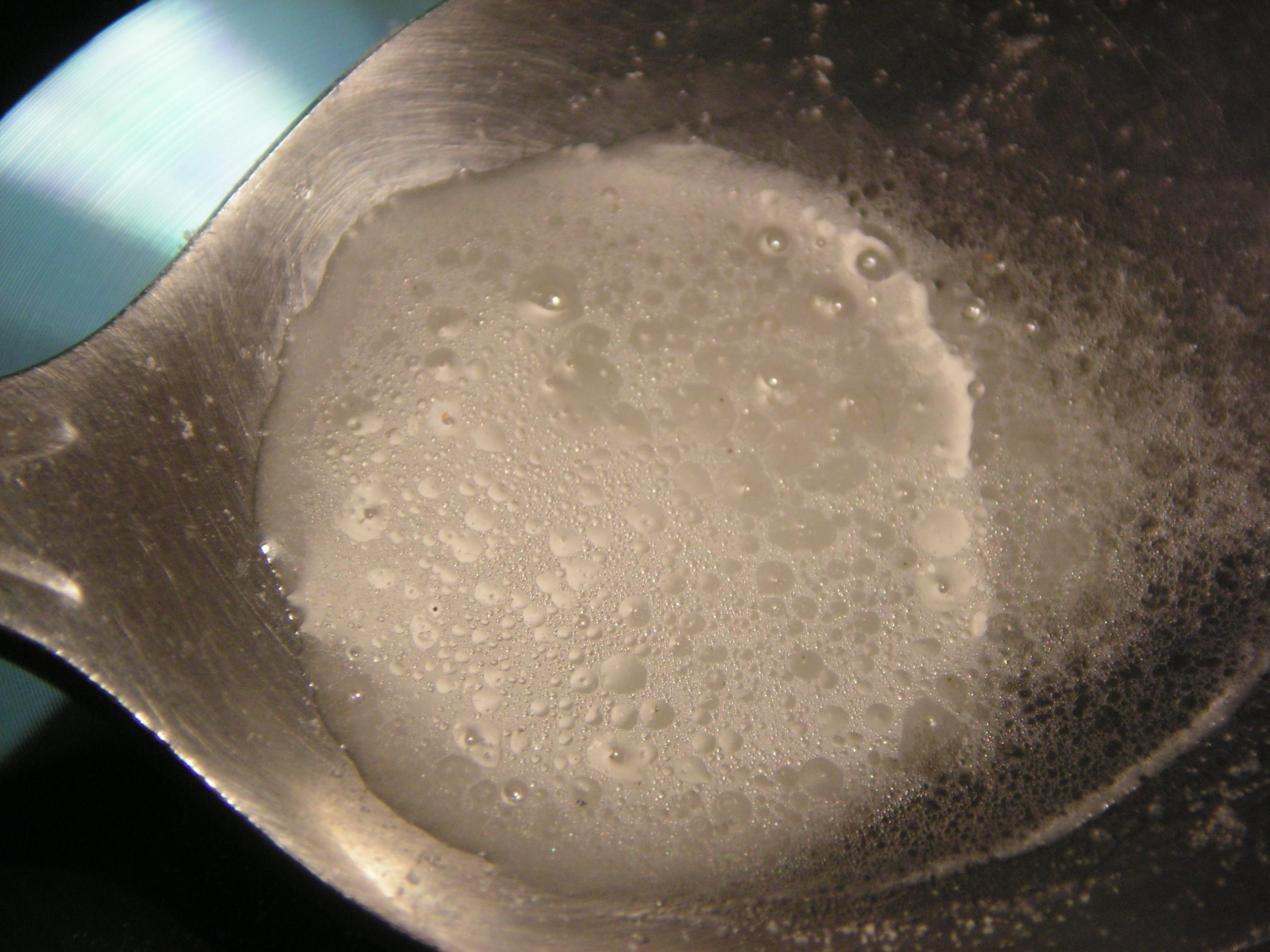
The "cooking" process that creates crack

Crack vaporizes near temperature 90 °C (194 °F), much lower than the cocaine hydrochloride melting point of 190 °C (374 °F). Whereas cocaine hydrochloride cannot be smoked (burns with no effect),

Crack cocaine can also be injected intravenously with the same effect as powder cocaine. However, whereas powder cocaine dissolves in water, crack must be dissolved in an acidic solution such as lemon juice (containing citric acid) or white vinegar (containing acetic acid), a process that effectively reverses the original conversion of powder cocaine to crack. Harm reduction and public health agencies may distribute packets of citric acid or ascorbic acid (vitamin C) for this purpose.

== Recreational use ==
Effects of crack cocaine include euphoria, supreme confidence, loss of appetite, insomnia, alertness, increased energy, a craving for more cocaine, and paranoia (ending after use).

Its initial effect is to release a large amount of dopamine, a brain chemical inducing feelings of euphoria. The high usually lasts from five to ten minutes, after which time dopamine levels in the brain plummet, leaving the user feeling depressed and low. When (powder) cocaine is dissolved and injected, the absorption into the bloodstream is at least as rapid as the absorption of the drug which occurs when crack cocaine is smoked, and similar euphoria may be experienced.

In a 2000 Brookhaven National Laboratory medical department study, based on self-reports of 32 people who used cocaine who participated in the study, "peak high" was found at a mean of 1.4 ± 0.5 minutes.

The onset of cocaine's euphoric effects is fastest with inhalation, beginning after 3–5 seconds. The drug is then quickly transported to the brain, where it acts on the central nervous system, producing an almost immediate "high" that can be very powerful – this initial crescendo of stimulation known as a rush. This is followed by an equally intense low, leaving the user craving more of the drug. Addiction to crack usually occurs within four to six weeks – much more rapidly than regular cocaine.

=== Route of administration ===
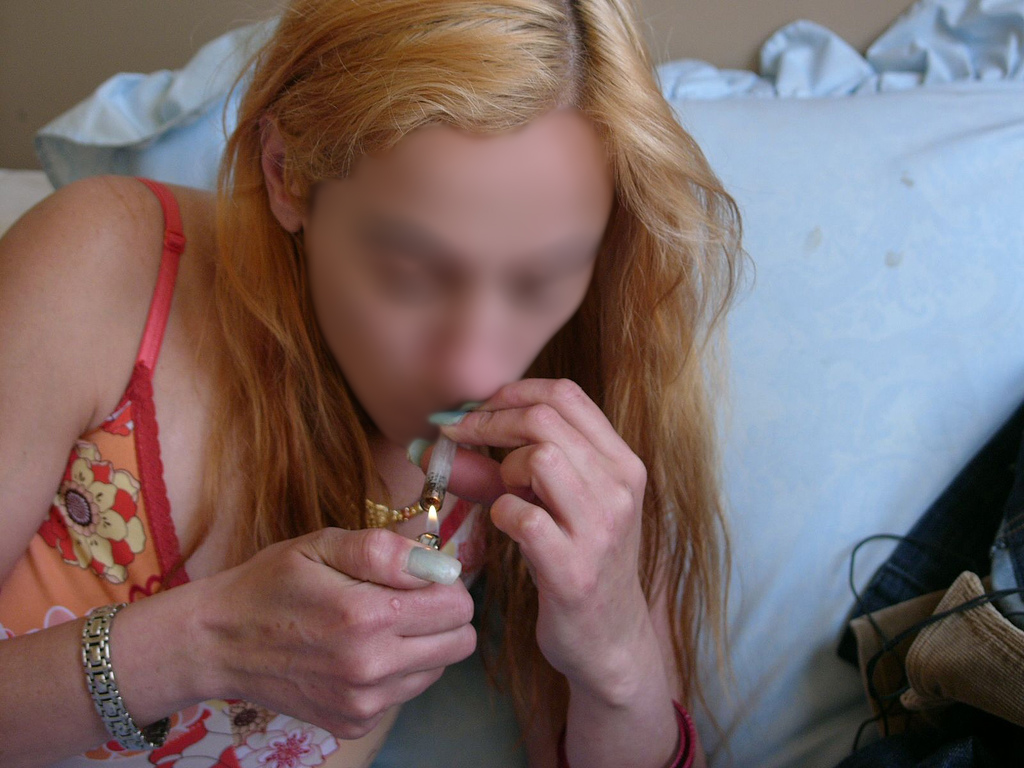
A woman smoking crack cocaine from a "love rose"

Crack cocaine is usually heated in a drug pipe until sublimation occurs at a relatively low temperature (about 90 °C) and the vapor is inhaled. This process is commonly referred to as "freebasing." Although commonly called "smoking," this method actually involves vaporizing the drug rather than burning it. If crack cocaine is burned directly, such as in a regular tobacco pipe, roll-your-own cigarette, or aluminium foil higher temperatures may lead to decomposition of the active compound, reducing its effectiveness. This is why vaporization at lower temperatures, rather than combustion, is the preferred method for administration. While no formal studies have specifically quantified the extent of drug loss during combustion, users commonly choose to vaporize crack cocaine to maximize its effects and potentially avoid wasting money. Additionally, vaporizing is generally considered less harsh on the throat and lungs compared to smoking crack through a tobacco pipe, as combustion can produce more irritating and toxic by-products.

Pyrolysis products of cocaine that occur only when heated/smoked have been shown to change the effect profile, i.e. anhydroecgonine methyl ester, when co-administered with cocaine, increases the dopamine in CPu and NAc brain regions, and has M_{1} — and M_{3} — receptor affinity.

The effects felt almost immediately after inhaled are very intense and do not last long – usually 2 to 10 minutes. When smoked, cocaine is sometimes combined with other drugs, such as cannabis, often rolled into a joint or blunt.

==== Love rose ====
People often freebase crack with a pipe made from a small glass tube, often taken from "love roses", small glass tubes with a paper rose that are promoted as romantic gifts. These are sometimes called "stems", "horns", "blasters" and "straight shooters". A small piece of clean heavy copper or occasionally stainless steel scouring pad – often called a "brillo" (actual Brillo Pads contain soap, and are not used) or "chore" (named for Chore Boy brand copper scouring pads) – serves as a reduction base and flow modulator in which the "rock" can be melted and boiled to vapor. Crack is smoked by placing it at the end of the pipe; a flame held close to it produces vapor, which is then inhaled by the smoker.

== Adverse effects ==
=== Physiological ===
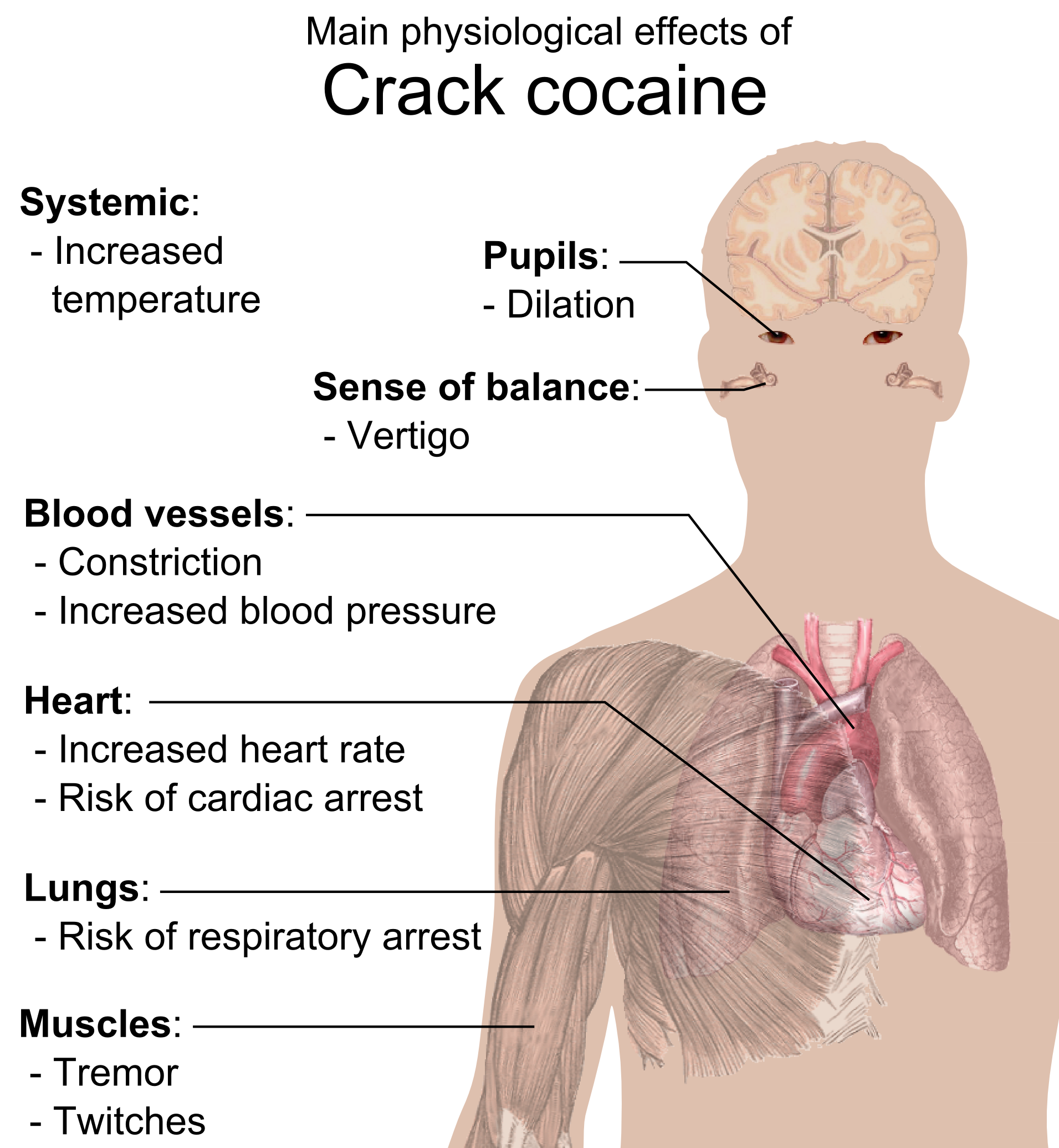
Main physiological effects of crack cocaine

Incidental exposure of the eye to sublimated cocaine while smoking crack cocaine can cause serious injury to the cornea and long-term loss of visual acuity.

The short-term physiological effects of cocaine include constricted blood vessels, dilated pupils, and increased temperature, heart rate, and blood pressure. Some users of cocaine report feelings of restlessness, irritability, and anxiety. In rare instances, sudden death can occur on the first use of cocaine or unexpectedly thereafter. Cocaine-related deaths are often a result of cardiac arrest or seizures followed by respiratory arrest.

Like other forms of cocaine, smoking crack can increase heart rate and blood pressure, leading to long-term cardiovascular problems. Some research suggests that smoking crack or free base cocaine has additional health risks compared to other methods of taking cocaine. Many of these issues relate specifically to the release of methylecgonidine and its effect on the heart, lungs, and liver.

- Toxic adulterants: Many substances may have been added to expand the weight and volume of a batch, while still appearing to be pure crack. Occasionally, highly toxic substances are used, with a range of corresponding short and long-term health risks. Adulterants used with crack and cocaine include milk powder, sugars such as glucose, starch, caffeine, lidocaine, benzocaine, paracetamol, amphetamine, scopolamine and strychnine.
- Smoking problems: Any route of administration poses its own set of health risks; in the case of crack cocaine, smoking tends to be more harmful than other routes. Crack users tend to smoke the drug because that has a higher bioavailability than other routes typically used for drugs of abuse, such as insufflation. Crack has a melting point of around 90 °C (194 °F), and the smoke does not remain potent for long. Therefore, crack pipes are generally very short, to minimize the time between evaporating and ingestion (thereby minimizing loss of potency). Having a very hot pipe pressed against the lips often causes cracked and blistered lips, colloquially known as "crack lip". The use of "convenience store crack pipes"—glass tubes which originally contained small artificial roses—may contribute to this condition. These 4-inch (10-cm) pipes are not durable and will quickly develop breaks; users may continue to use the pipe even though it has been broken to a shorter length. The hot pipe might burn the lips, tongue, or fingers, especially when passed between people who take hits in rapid succession, causing the short pipe to reach higher temperatures than if used by one person alone.
- Pure or large doses: Because the quality of crack can vary greatly, some people might smoke larger amounts of diluted crack, unaware that a similar amount of a new batch of purer crack could cause an overdose. This can trigger heart problems or cause unconsciousness.
- Pathogens on pipes: When pipes are shared, bacteria or viruses can be transferred from person to person.

Crack cocaine causes DNA damage in multiple organs of rats and mice.

==== Crack lung ====
In crack users, acute respiratory symptoms have been reported, sometimes termed "crack lung". Symptoms include fever, coughing up blood and difficulty breathing. In the 48-hour period after use, people with these symptoms have also had associated radiographic findings on chest X-ray of fluid in the lungs (pulmonary edema), interstitial pneumonia, diffuse alveolar hemorrhage, and eosinophil infiltration.

Physical side effects from chronic smoking of cocaine include coughing up blood, bronchospasm, itching, fever, diffuse alveolar infiltrates without effusions, pulmonary and systemic eosinophilia, chest pain, lung trauma, sore throat, asthma, hoarse voice, dyspnea (shortness of breath), and an aching, flu-like syndrome.

Crack cocaine users sometimes smoke "fry," which refers to cigarettes or marijuana sticks that have been dipped in embalming fluid and laced with PCP. Formaldehyde and methyl alcohol are the main ingredients found in fry, and their use has been linked to a range of physical health problems, including bronchitis, destruction of body tissues, brain and lung damage, impaired coordination, and inflammation or sores in the throat, nose, and esophagus.

=== Psychological ===
Intranasal cocaine and crack use are both associated with pharmacological violence. Crack-related violence is also systemic, relating to disputes between crack dealers and users.

Stimulant drug abuse (particularly amphetamine and cocaine) can lead to delusional parasitosis (aka Ekbom's Syndrome: a mistaken belief they are infested with parasites). For example, excessive cocaine use can lead to formication, nicknamed "cocaine bugs" or "coke bugs", where the affected people believe they have, or feel, parasites crawling under their skin (similar delusions may also be associated with high fever or in connection with alcohol withdrawal, sometimes accompanied by visual hallucinations of insects—see delirium tremens).

People experiencing these hallucinations might scratch themselves to the extent of serious skin damage and bleeding, especially when they are delirious.

Paranoia and anxiety are among the most common psychological symptoms of crack cocaine use. Psychosis is more closely associated with smoking crack cocaine than intranasal and intravenous use.

=== Pregnancy and nursing ===
Crack baby is a term for a child born to a mother who used crack cocaine during her pregnancy. The threat that cocaine use during pregnancy poses to the fetus is now considered exaggerated. Some of the other risks are now considered exaggerated as well, specifically the risk of irreversible behavior changes, criminal tendencies and intellectual disability.

Studies show that prenatal cocaine exposure (independent of other effects such as, for example, alcohol, tobacco, or physical environment) has no appreciable effect on childhood growth and development. However, the official opinion of the National Institute on Drug Abuse of the United States warns about health risks while cautioning against stereotyping:

Many recall that "crack babies", or babies born to mothers who used crack cocaine while pregnant, were at one time written off by many as a lost generation. They were predicted to suffer from severe, irreversible damage, including reduced intelligence and social skills. It was later found that this was a gross exaggeration. However, the fact that most of these children appear normal should not be over-interpreted as indicating that there is no cause for concern. Using sophisticated technologies, scientists are now finding that exposure to cocaine during fetal development may lead to subtle, yet significant, later deficits in some children, including deficits in some aspects of cognitive performance, information-processing, and attention to tasks—abilities that are important for success in school.

There are also warnings about the threat of breastfeeding: The March of Dimes said "it is likely that cocaine will reach the baby through breast milk," and advises the following regarding cocaine use during pregnancy:

Cocaine use during pregnancy can affect a pregnant woman and her unborn baby in many ways. During the early months of pregnancy, it may increase the risk of miscarriage. Later in pregnancy, it can trigger preterm labor (labor that occurs before 37 weeks of pregnancy) or cause the baby to grow poorly. As a result, cocaine-exposed babies are more likely than unexposed babies to be born with low birth weight (less than 5.5 lb or 2.5 kg). Low-birthweight babies are 20 times more likely to die in their first month of life than normal-weight babies, and face an increased risk of lifelong disabilities such as mental retardation and cerebral palsy. Cocaine-exposed babies also tend to have smaller heads, which generally reflect smaller brains. Some studies suggest that cocaine-exposed babies are at increased risk of birth defects, including urinary tract defects and, possibly, heart defects. Cocaine also may cause an unborn baby to have a stroke, irreversible brain damage, or a heart attack.

Other studies have also noted these risks.

=== Reinforcement disorders ===
==== Tolerance ====
An appreciable tolerance to cocaine's high may develop, with many addicts reporting that they seek but fail to achieve as much pleasure as they did from their first experience. Some users will frequently increase their doses to intensify and prolong the euphoric effects. While tolerance to the high can occur, users might also become more sensitive (drug sensitization) to cocaine's local anesthetic (painkilling) and convulsant (seizure-inducing) effects, without increasing the dose taken; this increased sensitivity may explain some deaths occurring after apparent low doses of cocaine.

==== Addiction ====
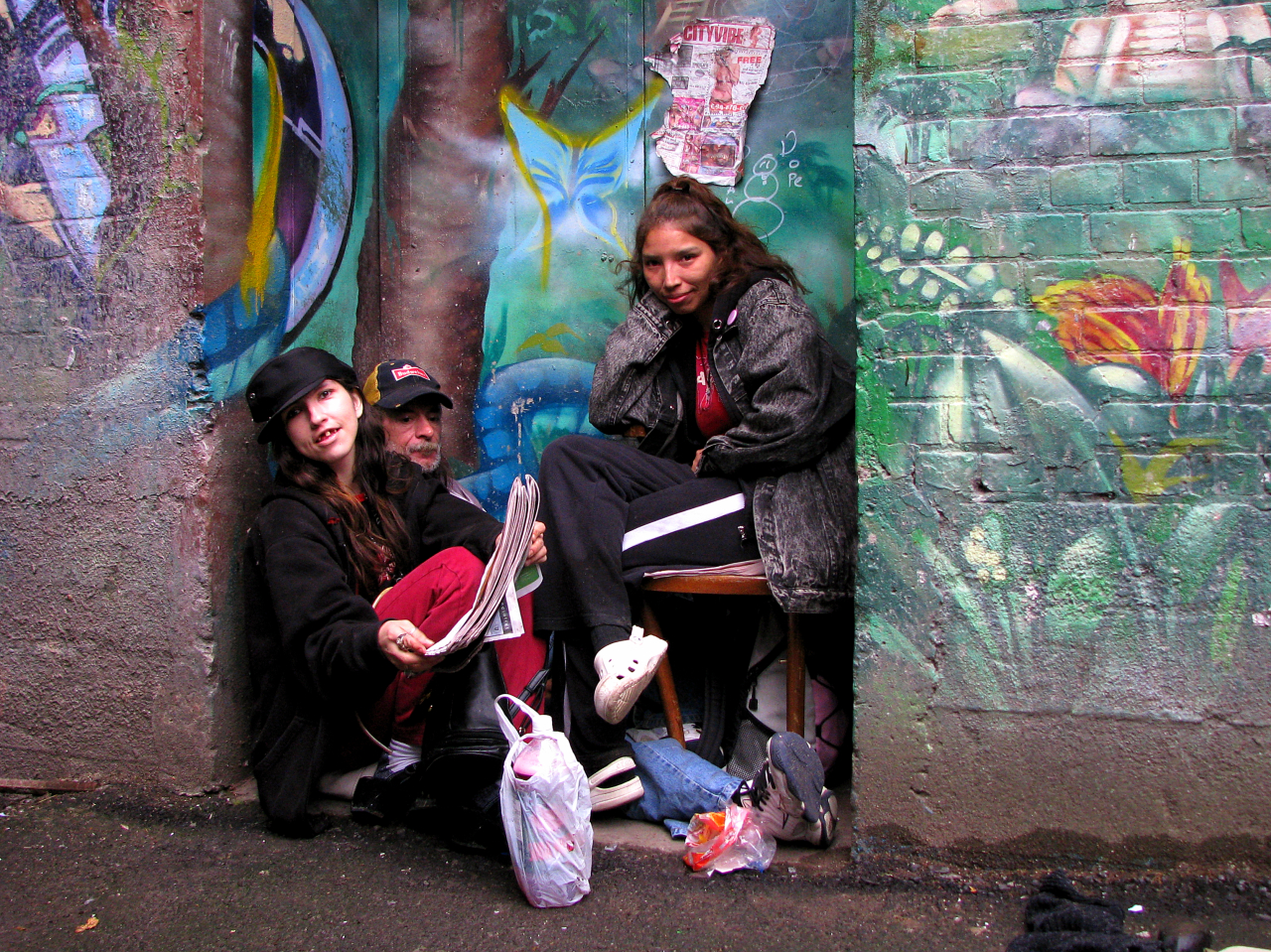
Crack users in DTES of Vancouver BC Canada in July 2008

Crack cocaine is popularly thought to be the most addictive form of cocaine. However, this claim has been contested: Morgan and Zimmer wrote that available data indicated that "smoking cocaine by itself does not increase markedly the likelihood of dependence ... The claim that cocaine is much more addictive when smoked must be reexamined." They argued that cocaine users who are already prone to abuse are most likely to "move toward a more efficient mode of ingestion" (that is, smoking).

The intense desire to recapture the initial high is what is so addictive for many users. On the other hand, Reinarman et al. wrote that the nature of crack addiction depends on the social context in which it is used and the psychological characteristics of users, pointing out that many heavy crack users can go for days or weeks without using the drug.

== Overdose ==
A typical response among users is to have another hit of the drug; however, the levels of dopamine in the brain take a long time to replenish themselves, and each hit taken in rapid succession leads to progressively less intense highs. Nonetheless, a person might binge for 3 or more days without sleep, while inhaling hits from a pipe.

Use of cocaine in a binge, during which the drug is taken repeatedly and at increasingly high doses, leads to a state of increasing irritability, restlessness, and paranoia. This may result in total paranoid psychosis, in which the individual loses touch with reality and experiences auditory hallucinations.

Large amounts of crack cocaine (several hundred milligrams or more) intensify the user's high, but may also lead to bizarre, erratic, and violent behavior. Large amounts can induce tremors, vertigo, muscle twitches, paranoia, or, with repeated doses, a toxic reaction closely resembling amphetamine poisoning.

== History ==
The exact origins of crack cocaine are unknown. Base forms of cocaine that are able to be smoked have existed since at least the 1880s. Independently, American chemist Henry Rusby & Peruvian chemist Alfredo Bignon devised methods to semi-refine cocaine into a smokable base form. This process was mostly intended to prevent the cocaine inside coca leaves from spoiling and is used as a temporary processing stage before turning coca leaves into cocaine powder. This cocaine paste, is still smoked in parts of South America today.

Until the mid 1970s, there was little demand for turning refined cocaine powder back into a smokable base form. This, combined with the fact that refining cocaine base required highly volatile chemicals, such as ammonia or ether, kept its popularity restricted.. A major change came when it was discovered that base cocaine could be formed without combustible chemicals & just by mixing powder cocaine with baking soda. The exact date of this discovery is unknown; however, Tootie Reese – a prominent drug dealer in L.A during the 70s – mentioned that "Bay Area chemistry students – 'white guys at Cal Berkeley'" had taught him the process as early as 1976. By the early 1980s, the price of powder cocaine had dropped by as much as 80% and selling crack was found to be significantly more profitable. While the presence of crack was initially reported in major cities like LA, San Diego, and Houston, it soon spread throughout the United States, in what became known as the crack epidemic.

== Society and culture ==
=== Synonyms ===
Crack cocaine is known by many streets names, the most common of which include, base; boulder; gravel; hail; hubba; rock; and yahoo.

=== Drug combinations ===
Crack cocaine may be combined with amphetamine ("croak"); tobacco ("coolie"); marijuana ("turbbo"); heroin ("moon rock"); and phencyclidine ("spacebase"). This type of mixed-drug use is higher risk than single-drug use.

=== Consumption ===
Crack smoking is commonly performed with crack pipes and utensils such as pipes; improvised pipes made from a plastic bottle; water pipes; and laboratory pipettes.

=== Legal status ===
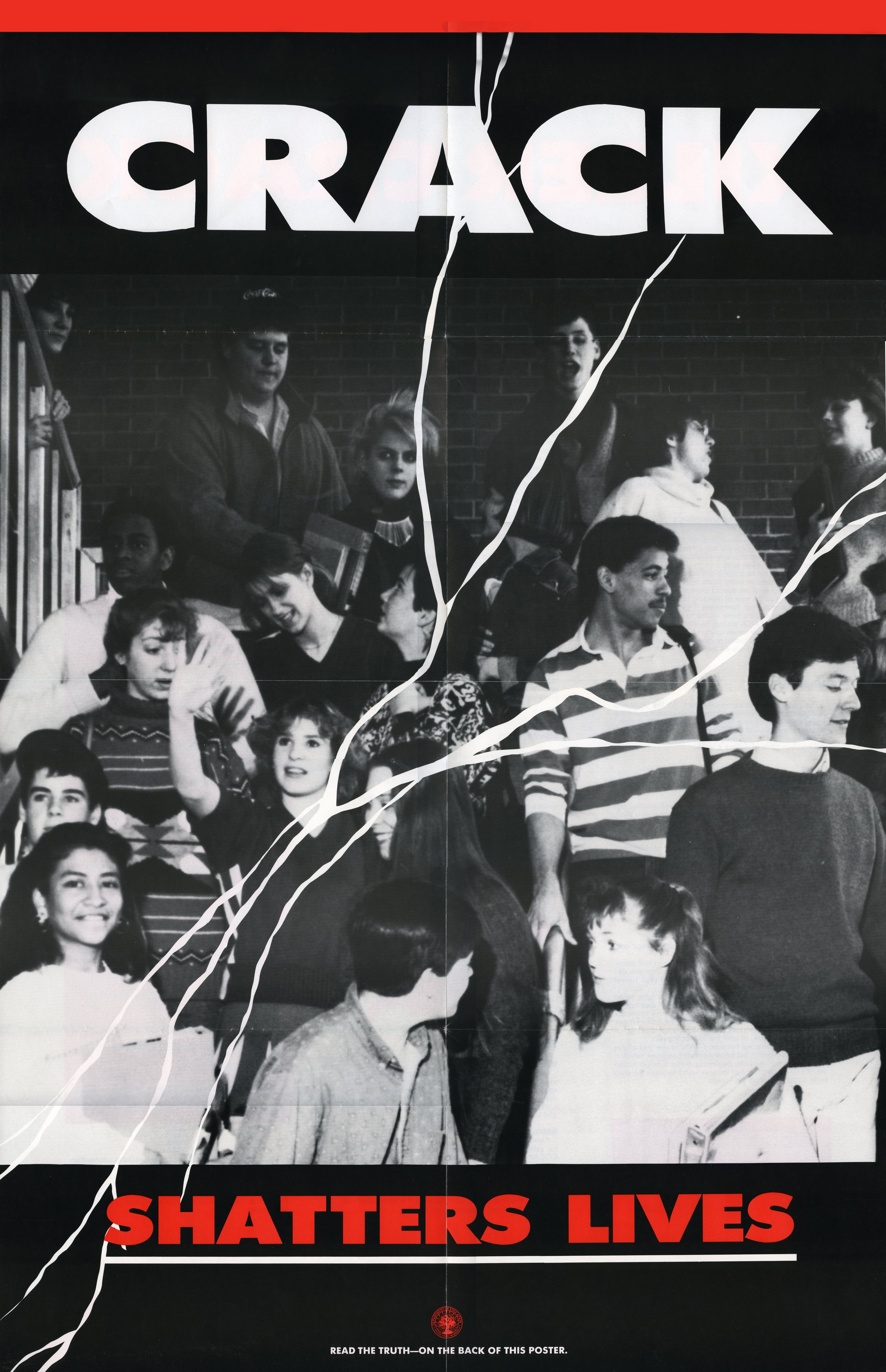
US Food and Drug Administration anti-crack poster distributed in the 1980s

Cocaine is listed as a Schedule I drug in the United Nations 1961 Single Convention on Narcotic Drugs, making it illegal for non-state-sanctioned production, manufacture, export, import, distribution, trade, use and possession. In most states (except in the United States) crack falls under the same category as cocaine.

==== Australia ====
In Australia, crack falls under the same category as cocaine, which is listed as a Schedule 8 controlled drug, indicating that any substances and preparations for therapeutic use under this category have a high potential for abuse and addiction. It is permitted for some medical use but is otherwise outlawed.

==== Canada ====
As a Schedule I substance under the Controlled Drugs and Substances Act, crack is not differentiated from cocaine and other coca products. However, the court may weigh the socio-economic factors of crack usage in sentencing. As a guideline, Schedule I drugs carry a maximum seven-year prison sentence for possession for an indictable offense and up to life imprisonment for trafficking and production. A summary conviction on possession carries a $1000–2000 fine and/or six months to a year imprisonment.

==== United States ====
In the United States, cocaine is a Schedule II drug under the Controlled Substances Act, indicating that it has a high abuse potential but also carries a medicinal purpose. Under the Controlled Substances Act, crack and cocaine are considered the same drug.

The Anti-Drug Abuse Act of 1986 increased penalties for crack cocaine possession and usage. It mandated a mandatory minimum sentence of five years without parole for possession of five grams of crack; to receive the same sentence with powder cocaine one had to have 500 grams. This sentencing disparity was reduced from 100-to-1 to 18-to-1 by the Fair Sentencing Act of 2010.

==== Europe ====
In the United Kingdom, crack is a Class A drug under the Misuse of Drugs Act 1971. In the Netherlands it is a List 1 drug of the Opium Law.

=== Political scandals ===
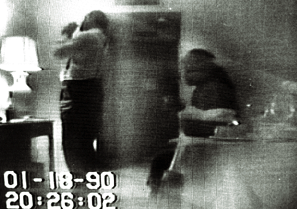
D.C. Mayor Marion Barry captured on a surveillance camera smoking crack cocaine during a sting operation

Marion Barry, Mayor of Washington D.C., was filmed smoking crack in 1990 in a sting operation. Rob Ford, Mayor of Toronto, Ontario was filmed smoking crack in 2013 by gang members while holding office.

=== Impact ===
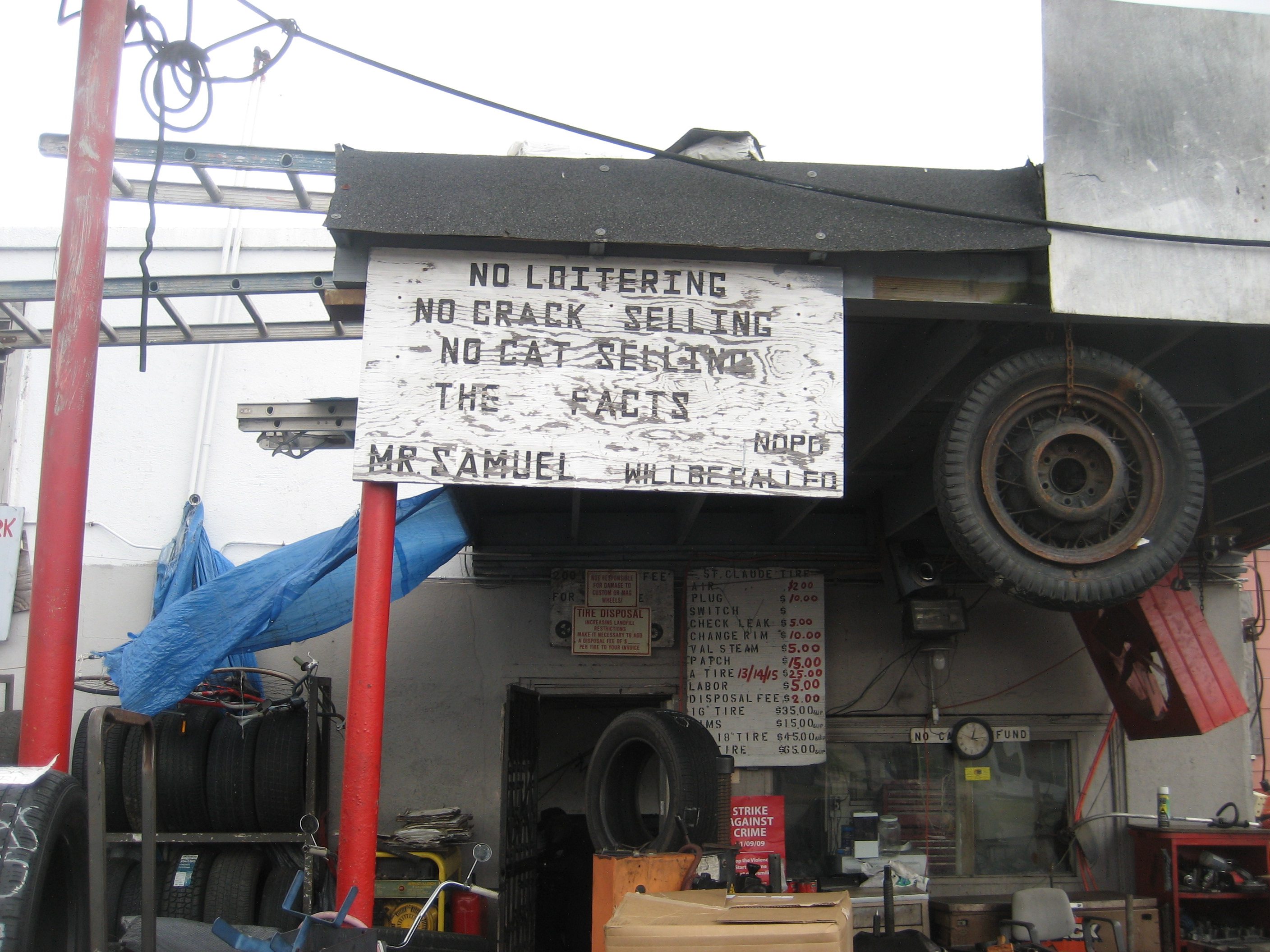
Tire repair shop, New Orleans, 2009. Sign prohibits loitering, selling of crack cocaine, and "cat selling," a euphemism for prostitution. "NOPD will be called" refers to New Orleans Police Department.

Many major American urban areas contain crack houses. In some cases, enraged citizens have burned crack houses to the ground, in hopes that by destroying the sites for drug operations they would also drive the illegal industries from their neighborhoods.

Crack cocaine use is often initiated through close social relationships and may serve as a coping mechanism for trauma and negative emotions. It is perceived as more potent and harmful than powdered cocaine, with increased risks of violence, social isolation, and involvement in the sex trade. Based on a small sample of women, findings suggest the importance of addressing emotional regulation, trauma, and social support in prevention and treatment, though they are not broadly generalizable.

== See also ==
- Calixcoca, an experimental vaccine against the effect of crack cocaine being developed by UFMG
- CIA involvement in Contra cocaine trafficking, alleged CIA involvement in drug trafficking for the Contras in Nicaragua
- Cocaine paste, an unrefined extract of cocaine obtained during the processing of coca leaves
