= Succinaldehyde =

Names
- Preferred IUPAC name Butanedial
- Other names Succinaldehyde

Identifiers
CAS Number	638-37-9
3D model (JSmol)	Interactive image
ChemSpider	12007
ECHA InfoCard	100.010.304
PubChem CID	12524
UNII	0503177591
CompTox Dashboard (EPA)	DTXSID3021514
- InChI: InChI=1S/C4H6O2/c5-3-1-2-4-6/h3-4H,1-2H2
- SMILES: O=CCCC=O

Properties
Chemical formula	C_{4}H_{6}O_{2}
Molar mass	86.09
Appearance	colourless liquid
Density	1.064 g/cm^{3}
Boiling point	58 °C (136 °F; 331 K) at 9 mm Hg
Solubility in water	with hydration
- Except where otherwise noted, data are given for materials in their standard state (at 25 °C [77 °F], 100 kPa). Infobox references

Succinaldehyde or Butanedial is an organic compound with the formula (C_{2}H_{4})(CHO)_{2}. It is a colorless viscous liquid. Typical of some other saturated dialdehydes, succinaldehyde is handled as the hydrates or methanol-derived acetal. It is a precursor to tropinone. Succinaldehyde can be used as a crosslinking agent for proteins, but it is less widely used than the related dialdehyde glutaraldehyde.

== Preparation and reactions ==
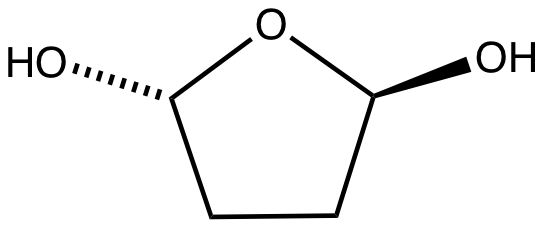
2,5-Dihydroxytetrahydrofuran, the hydrated form of succinaldehyde.

Succinaldehyde is generated by the oxidation of tetrahydrofuran with chlorine followed by hydrolysis of the chlorinated product. It can also be prepared by the hydroformylation of acrolein or the acetals thereof. Oxidation of 2,5-dimethoxytetrahydrofuran with hydrogen peroxide is yet another route to succinaldehyde.

In the presence of water, succinaldehyde converts to the cyclic hydrate. In methanol it converts to the cyclic acetal, 2,5-dimethoxyltetrahydrofuran.
