= Acetonedicarboxylic acid =

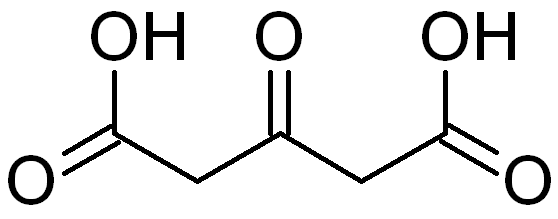
- Skeletal formula

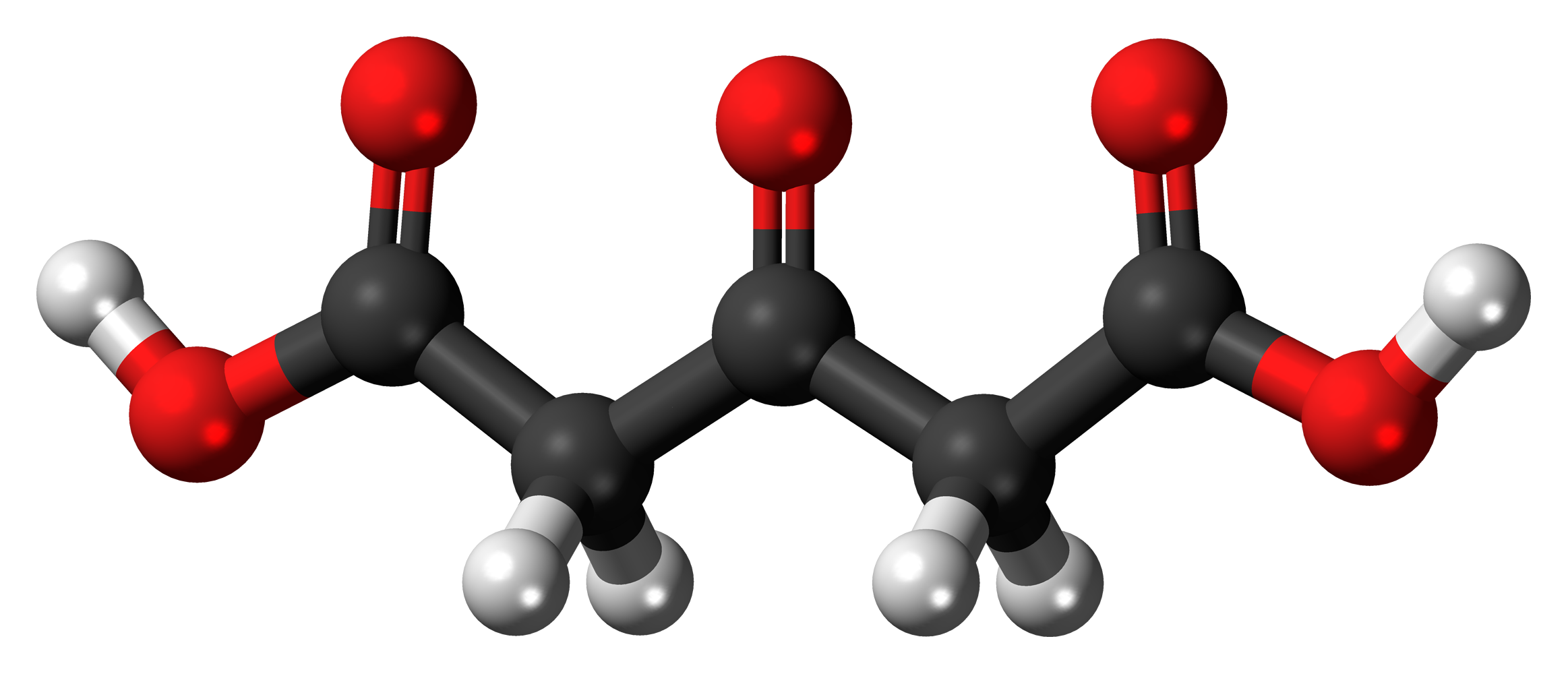
- Ball-and-stick model

Names
- Preferred IUPAC name 3-Oxopentanedioic acid
- Other names: 1,3-Acetonedicarboxylic acid; 3-oxoglutaric acid; 3-ketoglutaric acid; β-ketoglutaric acid

Identifiers
CAS Number	542-05-2
3D model (JSmol)	Interactive image; Interactive image
ChEBI	CHEBI:88950
ChemSpider	61623
ECHA InfoCard	100.007.999
EC Number	208-797-9
PubChem CID	68328
UNII	IH7P7WO21P
CompTox Dashboard (EPA)	DTXSID2060252
- InChI: InChI=1S/C5H6O5/c6-3(1-4(7)8)2-5(9)10/h1-2H2,(H,7,8)(H,9,10) Key: OXTNCQMOKLOUAM-UHFFFAOYSA-N; InChI=1/C5H6O5/c6-3(1-4(7)8)2-5(9)10/h1-2H2,(H,7,8)(H,9,10) Key: OXTNCQMOKLOUAM-UHFFFAOYAR
- SMILES: C(C(=O)CC(=O)O)C(=O)O; O=C(O)CC(=O)CC(=O)O

Properties
Chemical formula	C_{5}H_{6}O_{5}
Molar mass	146.09814 g/mol
Appearance	colorless or white solid
Density	1.499 g/cm^{3}
Melting point	122 °C (252 °F; 395 K) (decomposes)
Boiling point	408.4 °C (767.1 °F; 681.5 K) (760mm Hg)

Hazards
- GHS labelling
Pictograms	(GHS07: Exclamation mark)
Signal word	Warning
Hazard statements	H315, H319, H335
Precautionary statements	P261, P264, P271, P280, P302+P352, P304+P340, P305+P351+P338, P312, P321, P332+P313, P337+P313, P362, P403+P233, P405, P501
Flash point	214.9 °C (418.8 °F; 488.0 K)
- Except where otherwise noted, data are given for materials in their standard state (at 25 °C [77 °F], 100 kPa). verify (what is ?) Infobox references

Acetonedicarboxylic acid is the organic compound with the formula O=C(CH_{2}CO_{2}H)_{2}. It is classified as both a dicarboxylic acid and an oxocarboxylic acid.

== Preparation ==
Acetonedicarboxylic acid is prepared commercially by oxidation of citric acid. It can also be prepared by treating citric acid with fuming sulfuric acid.

== Reactions and uses ==
Upon heating it undergoes decarboxylation first to give acetoacetic acid then acetone:

O=C(CH_{2}CO_{2}H) → O=C(CH_{3})(CO_{2}H) + CO_{2}
O=C(CH_{3})(CO_{2}H) → O=C(CH_{3})_{2} + CO_{2}

Acetonedicarboxylic acid and its esters such as dimethylacetonedicarboxylate are primarily used as building blocks in the synthesis of heterocycles One example is it use in Robinson's classic synthesis of tropinone. It participates in the Weiss–Cook reaction.

== Related compounds ==
- α-ketoglutarate

== See also ==
- α-Ketoglutaric acid
