= Transition metal complexes of dienes, trienes, and tetraenes =

Coordination compound

In organometallic chemistry, a transition metal complexes of dienes, trienes, and tetraenes are coordination complexes containing one or more diene, triene, or tetraene ligands. The inventory is large. Such compounds are intermediates in many catalytic reactions that convert dienes to other organic products.

== Dienes ==
Butadiene and isoprene, two abundantly available dienes, both form a wide range of complexes. These complexes include species such as (butadiene)iron tricarbonyl. A homoleptic example is Mo(1,3-butadiene)_{3}.

Representative metal complexes of dienes.

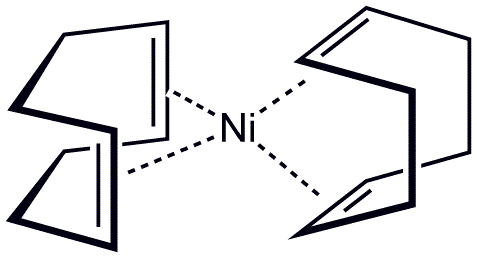
Bis(cyclooctadiene)nickel(0), a catalyst and source of "naked nickel."

A complex of trans-butadiene

Crabtree's catalyst, a catalyst for hydrogenation of hindered alkenes.

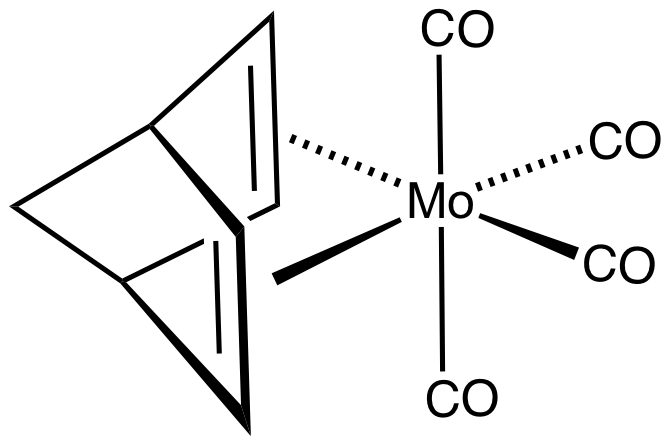
(Norbornadiene)molybdenum tetracarbonyl, a source of "Mo(CO)_{4}"

(Xylylene)Fe(CO)_{3}, illustrating the stabilization of a labile dialkene by complexation

A large number of complexes are known of the type (diene)iron tricarbonyl.

== Trienes and tetraenes ==
Trienes and even some tetraenes can bind to metals through several adjacent carbon centers. Common examples of such ligands are cycloheptatriene and cyclooctatetraene. Benzene and other arenes, which are trienes, forms a variety of complexes.

Representative metal complexes of trienes and tetraenes.

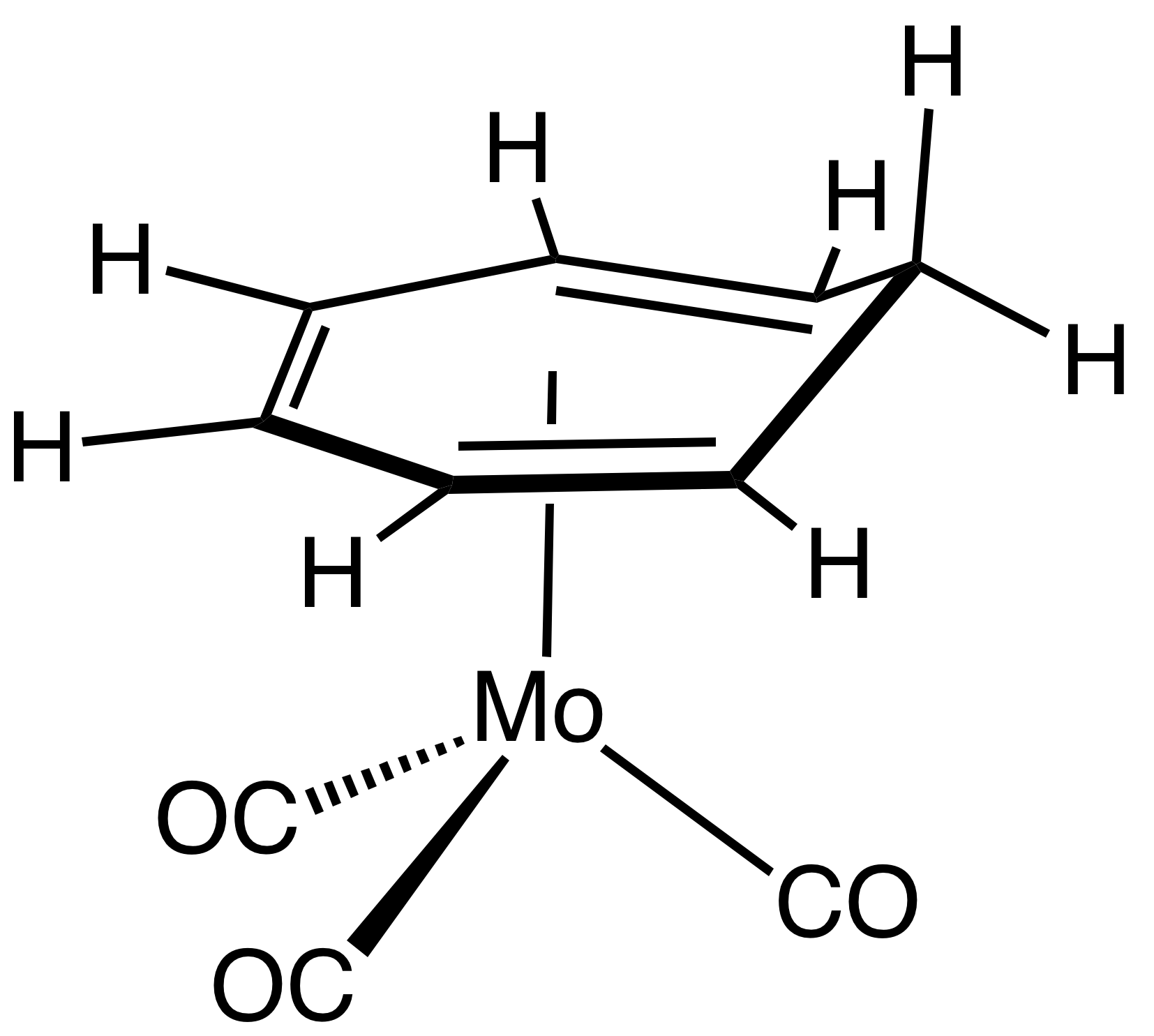
Mo(C_{7}H_{8})(CO)_{3}, a complex of cycloheptatriene

Fe(C_{8}H_{8})_{2}, a complex of cyclooctatetraene

Cr(η^{6}-C_{6}H_{6})_{2}, bis(benzene)chromium

== Synthesis ==
Complexes of dienes, trienes, and tetraenes are typically prepared by treating metal complexes with preformed alkenes. These ligands are not highly nucleophilic, thus complexes are often prepared using labile precursors.

== Bonding and structure ==
The bonding between di-and polyenes to transition metals is described by the Dewar–Chatt–Duncanson model.

Focusing on dienes (tri- and tetraenes would be still more complex), their binding to metals is described using hapticity notation: in an η^{2} and η^{4} modes, the latter having four M-C bonds. η^{4}-Dienes are 4-electron ligands, η^{6}-trienes are 6-electron ligands, and η^{8}-tetraenes are 8-electron ligands.

Butadiene more commonly binds in its cisoid rotamer, but transoid butadiene ligands have been observed. In both cases, the rotation about the two vinyl subunits is blocked.

labels for syn and anti protons in an eta-4, cis-butadiene complex

== Reactions and applications ==
Diene complexes are precursors to many other organometallic derivatives. Addition of proton or hydride gives allyl complexes. The interaction of metals with cyclopentadiene readily gives cyclopentadienyl complexes.

In terms of applications, dienes are substrates for a variety of catalytic reactions, where it is assumed that the diene binds to the metal center. For example, polymerization and oligomerization. Ni(0) complexes convert butadiene to cyclododecatriene. In the Kuraray process, palladium(II) catalyzes the conversion of butadiene and water to octenols. Palladium complexes also catalyze the carboxylation of two equivalents of butadiene to give unsaturated lactones.

Chiral dienes support asymmetric catalysis.
