= (Diene)iron tricarbonyl =

In organometallic chemistry, (diene)iron tricarbonyl describes a diverse family of related coordination complexes consisting of a diene ligand coordinated to a Fe(CO)_{3} center. Often the diene is conjugated, e.g., butadiene, but the family includes nonconjugated dienes as well. The compounds are yellow, air-stable, often low-melting, and soluble in hydrocarbon solvents. The motif is so robust that even unstable dienes form easily characterized derivatives, such as norbornadienone and cyclobutadiene.

== Scope ==
structure of the Fe(CO)_{3} adduct of vitamin A aldehyde.

The inventory of complexes is large. Receiving particular attention are complexes of linear conjugated 1,3-dienes and cyclic dienes with various spacings of the two alkene units around the ring.

Selected (diene)Fe(CO)_{3} Complexes
Diene	CAS RN	Physical properties	Notes
(Butadiene)Fe(CO)_{3}	12078-32-9	yellow-orange, m.p. 19 °C	major prototype
(Cyclobutadiene)Fe(CO)_{3}	12078-17-0	orange solid, b.p. 47 °C (3 mmHg)	antiaromatic ligand
(1,3-Cyclohexadiene)Fe(CO)_{3}	12252-72-6	yellow, m.p. 8–9 °C	major prototype for steroidal and terpenoid derivatives
(1,3-Cyclooctadiene)Fe(CO)_{3}	33270-50-7	yellow, m.p. 36 °C	isomeric with 1,5-cyclooctadiene derivative
(1,5-Cyclooctadiene)Fe(CO)_{3}	12093-20-8	yellow, m.p. 76 °C	non-conjugated diene
(Isoprene)Fe(CO)_{3}	32731-93-4	yellow liquid	chiral
(Methoxy-1,3-cyclohexadiene)Fe(CO)_{3}		yellow oil, b.p. 66–68 °C (0.1 mmHg)	Mixture of two isomers, from Birch reduction of anisole
(Norbornadiene)Fe(CO)_{3}	12307-07-2	yellow, m.p. −2 °C	non-conjugated diene
(Norbornadienone)Fe(CO)_{3}	12307-01-6	yellow, m.p. 93–95 °C	free diene-one is unstable
(Thebaine)iron tricarbonyl			
(η^{4}-Thiepine)Fe(CO)_{3}	-	yellow, , m.p. 54.5–55 °C	chiral; stable, even though free thiepine is not
(Xylylene)Fe(CO)_{3}	, m.p. 39 °C	yellow	free diene is unstable

== Preparation and uses ==
Many of diene complexes were originally prepared by reaction of iron pentacarbonyl with the diene under UV-radiation:

Fe(CO)_{5} + diene → (diene)Fe(CO)_{3} + 2 CO

In some cases, isolated yields are modest because the complexes, which are often liquids, volatilize during workup. Some derivatives are prepared by displacement of bda from (benzylideneacetone)iron tricarbonyl (Fe(bda)(CO)_{3}). Addition of nucleophiles to (pentadienyl) iron tricarbonyl cations gives the neutral diene complex. Diene complexes can also be produced by dehalogenation of 1,4-dihalobutene derivatives:

Fe_{2}(CO)_{9} + C_{6}H_{4}(CH_{2}Br)_{2} → FeBr_{2} + (C_{6}H_{4}(=CH_{2})_{2})Fe(CO)_{3} + 6 CO

The Fe(CO)_{3} unit serves as a protecting group for the diene, preventing the diene from participating in Diels-Alder reactions and hydrogenation. The diene is usually deprotected with ceric ammonium nitrate.

== Reactions ==
These complexes participate in several reactions of potential value in organic synthesis. The dienes are susceptible to acylation using fairly standard Friedel-Crafts conditions. Once transformed, the diene can be removed with ceric ammonium nitrate as well as trimethylamine N-oxide.

Some iron tricarbon complexes of cyclopentadienones catalyze hydrogenation, see Knolker complex.

== Characterization ==
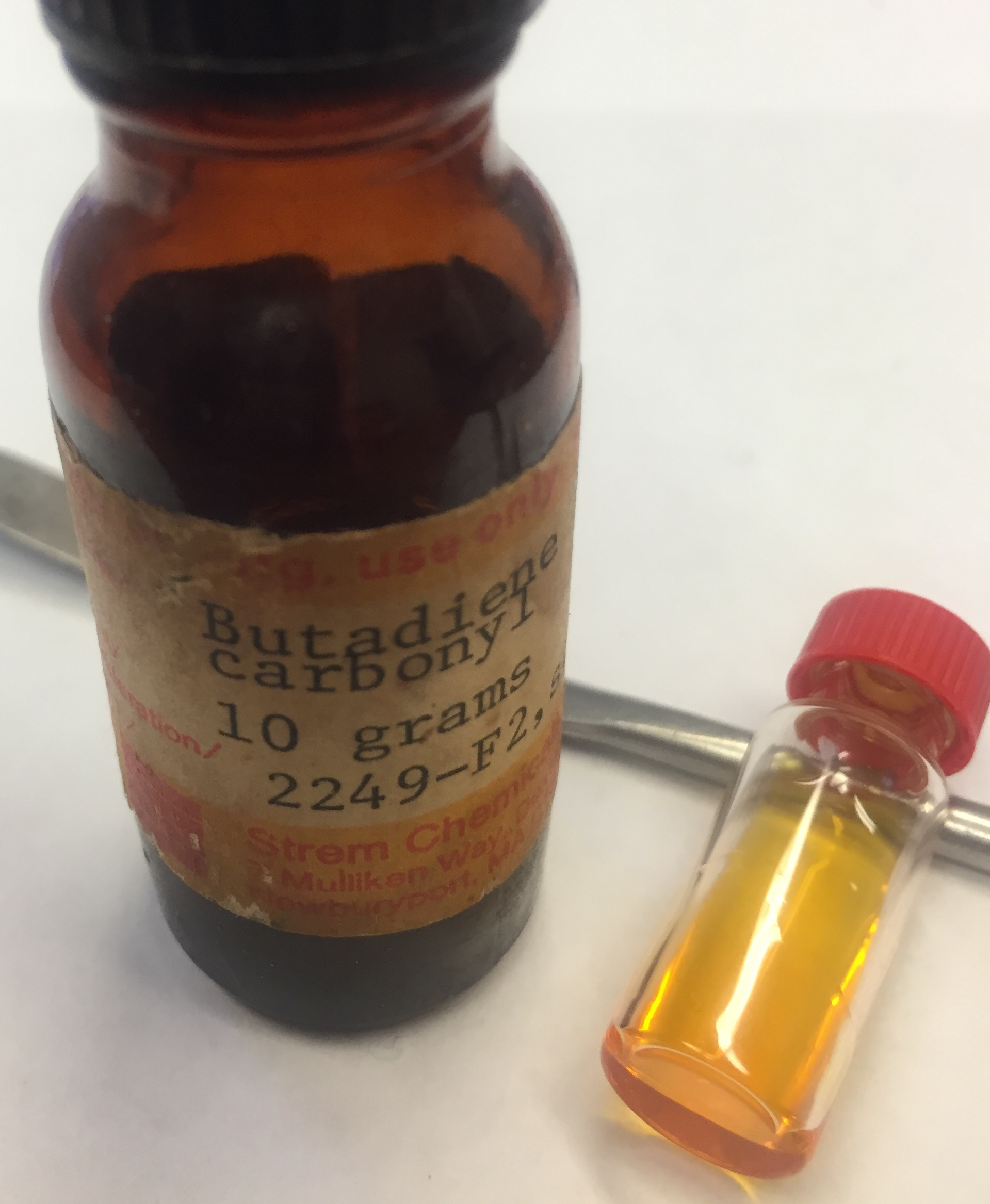
Sample of (butadiene)Fe(CO)_{3}, illustrating the color typical of this family of compounds.

IR spectra of these complexes show ν_{CO} bands near 2040 and 1969 cm^{−1}. At low temperatures, the lower energy band splits, which has been interpreted as evidence for fluxionality on the IR timescale.
