= Diene =

Covalent compound that contains two double bonds

1,3-butadiene

In organic chemistry, a diene (/ˈdaɪiːn/ DY-een); also diolefin, /daɪˈoʊləfɪn/ dy-OH-lə-fin) or alkadiene) is a covalent compound that contains two double bonds, usually among carbon atoms. They thus contain two alkene units, with the standard prefix di of systematic nomenclature. As a subunit of more complex molecules, dienes occur in naturally occurring and synthetic chemicals and are used in organic synthesis. Conjugated dienes are widely used as monomers in the polymer industry. Polyunsaturated fats are of interest to nutrition. According to the Gold Book definition, a "diene" could include one or more heteroatoms which replace unsaturated carbon atoms, giving structures that could more specifically be called heterodienes.

Compounds that contain more than two double bonds are called polyenes. Polyenes and dienes share many properties.

== Classification ==
Dienes can be divided into three classes, depending on the relative location of the double bonds:

1. Cumulated dienes have the double bonds sharing a common atom. The result is more specifically called an allene.
2. Conjugated dienes have conjugated double bonds separated by one single bond. Conjugated dienes are more stable than other dienes because of resonance.
3. Unconjugated dienes have the double bonds separated by two or more single bonds. They are usually less stable than isomeric conjugated dienes. This can also be known as an isolated diene.

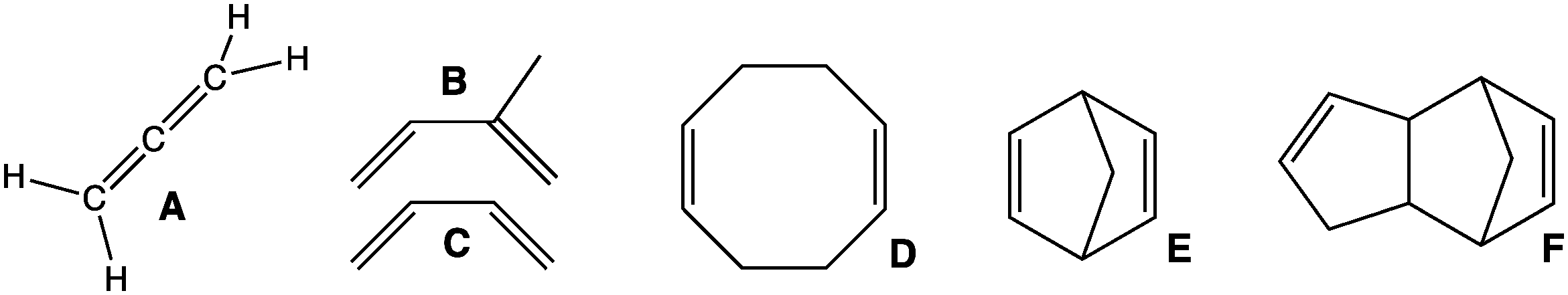
Some dienes: A: 1,2-Propadiene, also known as allene, is the simplest cumulated diene. B: Isoprene, also known as 2-methyl-1,3-butadiene, the precursor to natural rubber. C: 1,3-Butadiene, a precursor to synthetic polymers. D: 1,5-Cyclooctadiene, an unconjugated diene (notice that each double bond is two carbons away from the other). E: Norbornadiene, a strained bicyclic and unconjugated diene. F: Dicyclopentadiene.

== Conjugated dienes ==
Conjugated dienes are also called 1,3-dienes. Commercially significant conjugated dienes include 1,3-butadiene, isoprene, chloroprene, and cyclopentadiene. Other common members are 1,3-pentadiene (piperylene) and 1,3-cyclohexadiene.

On an industrial scale, butadiene and pentadiene are prepared by steam cracking. In a similar process, dicyclopentadiene is obtained from coal tars. Conjugated dienes can be formed by the addition of two good leaving groups across a double bond, followed by base workup. Dienes can also be produced from the semihydrogenation of diynes. Pd catalysts tend to degrade homoconjugate dienes, but Ni works well. Myriad name reactions have been developed, including the Whiting reaction.

=== Reactions ===
The most heavily practiced reaction of dienes is polymerization to rubber used in tires and other flexible objects. These reactions require metal catalysts such as those used in Ziegler-Natta polymerization.

An important reaction for conjugated dienes is the Diels–Alder reaction. Many specialized dienes have been developed to exploit this reactivity for the synthesis of natural products (e.g., Danishefsky's diene).

Conjugated dienes add reagents such as bromine and hydrogen by both 1,2-addition and 1,4-addition pathways.

== Nonconjugated dienes ==
α,ω-Dienes have the formula (CH_{2})_{n}(CH=CH_{2})_{2}. They are prepared industrially by ethenolysis of cyclic dienes. For example, 1,5-hexadiene and 1,9-decadiene, useful crosslinking agents and synthetic intermediates, are produced from 1,5-cyclooctadiene and cyclooctene, respectively. The catalyst is derived from Re_{2}O_{7} on alumina. Families of nonconjugated dienes are derived from the oligomerization and dimerization of conjugated dienes. For example, 1,5-cyclooctadiene and 4-vinylcyclohexene are produced by dimerization of 1,3-butadiene.

Nonconjugated dienes are substrates for ring-closing metathesis reactions. These reactions require a metal catalyst:

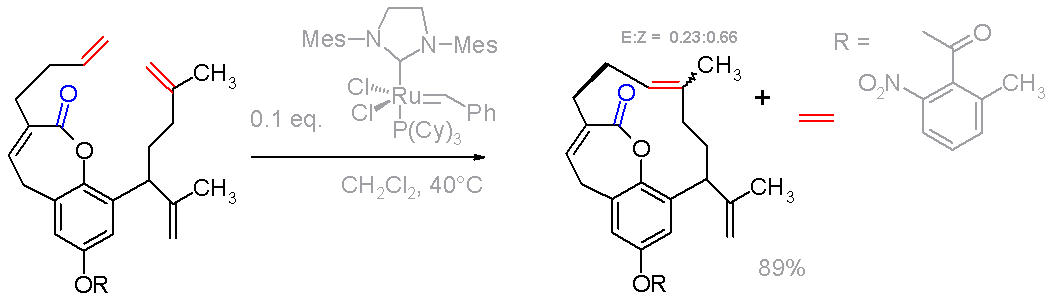

Addition of polar reagents can generate complex architectures:

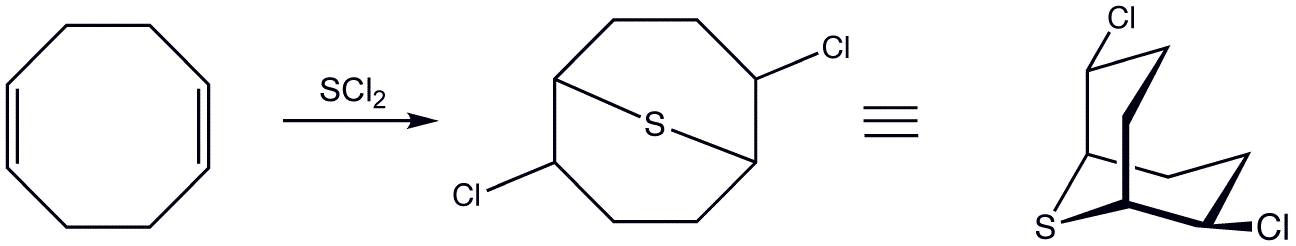

== Biological dienes ==
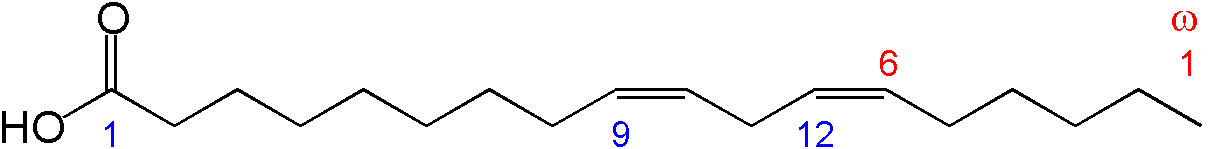
Linoleic acid

Diene-containing fatty acids are common. Common ones are linolenic acid CH_{3}CH_{2}CH=CHCH_{2}CH=CHCH_{2}CH=CH(CH_{2})_{7}CO_{2}H and linoleic acid CH_{3}(CH_{2})_{4}CH=CHCH_{2}CH=CH(CH_{2})_{7}CO_{2}H. The 1,3-pentadiene group in these 1,4-dienes is susceptible to H-atom abstraction. The derived fats (triglycerides) are drying oils

== Acidity ==
The position adjacent to a double bond is acidic because the resulting allyl anion is stabilized by resonance. This effect becomes more pronounced as more alkenes are involved to create greater stability. For example, deprotonation at position 3 of a 1,4-diene or position 5 of a 1,3-diene give a pentadienyl anion. An even greater effect is seen if the anion is aromatic, for example, deprotonation of cyclopentadiene to give the cyclopentadienyl anion.

C_{2}-symmetric diene ligand used in asymmetric catalysis.

=== As ligands ===
Dienes are widely used chelating ligands in organometallic chemistry. In some cases they serve as placeholder ligands, being removed during a catalytic cycle. For example, the cyclooctadiene ("cod") ligands in bis(cyclooctadiene)nickel(0) are labile. In some cases, dienes are spectator ligands, remaining coordinated throughout a catalytic cycle and influencing the product distributions. Chiral dienes have also been described. Other diene complexes include (butadiene)iron tricarbonyl, cyclobutadieneiron tricarbonyl, and cyclooctadiene rhodium chloride dimer.
