= Transition metal arene complex =

Structure of Cr(η^{6}-C_{6}H_{6})_{2}

Metal arene complexes are organometallic compounds of the formula (C_{6}R_{6})_{x}ML_{y}. Common classes are of the type (C_{6}R_{6})ML_{3} and (C_{6}R_{6})_{2}M. These compounds are reagents in inorganic and organic synthesis. The principles that describe arene complexes extend to related organic ligands such as many heterocycles (e.g. thiophene) and polycyclic aromatic compounds (e.g. naphthalene).

== Synthesis ==
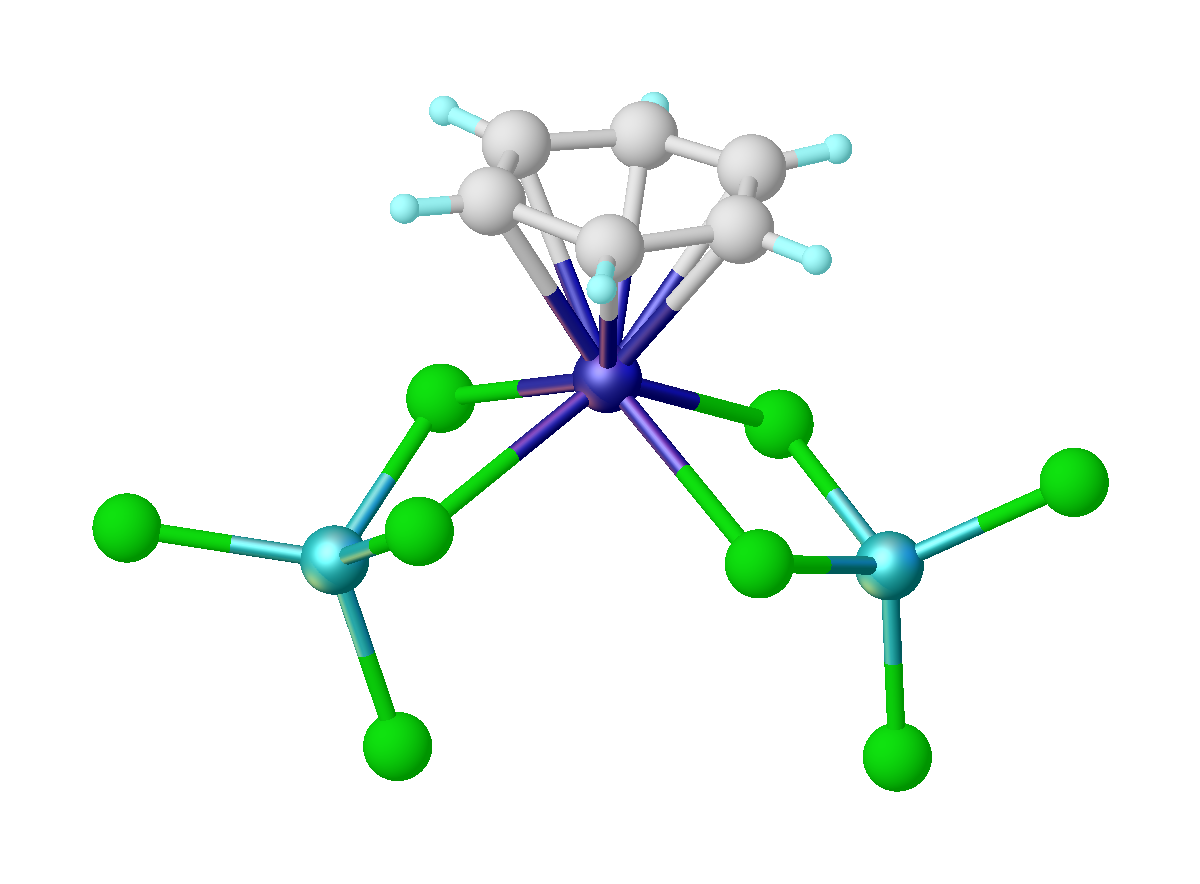
Structure of (C_{6}H_{6})Ti(Cl_{2}AlCl_{2})_{2}, illustrative intermediate in Fischer-Hafner syntheses

=== Fischer–Hafner synthesis ===
Also known as reductive Friedel–Crafts reaction, the Fischer–Hafner synthesis entails treatment of metal chlorides with arenes in the presence of aluminium trichloride and aluminium metal. The method was demonstrated in the 1950s with the synthesis of bis(benzene)chromium by Walter Hafner and his advisor E. O. Fischer. The method has been extended to other metals, e.g. [Ru(C_{6}Me_{6})_{2}]^{2+}. In this reaction, the AlCl_{3} serves to remove chloride from the metal precursor, and the Al metal functions as the reductant. The Fischer-Hafner synthesis is limited to arenes lacking sensitive functional groups.

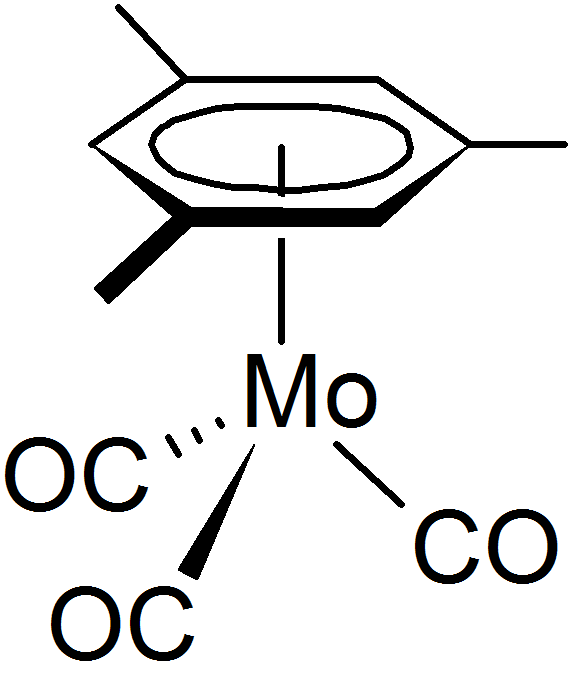
Structure of Mo(η^{6}-C_{6}H_{3}Me_{3})(CO)_{3}.

=== Direct synthesis ===
Although many metal-arene complexes are robust, few are prepared by the direct reaction of arenes with metal salts. The main example is provided by silver perchlorate (and related salts), which dissolve in liquid arenes and crystallize with arene ligands. The strength of the metal-arene interaction is weak as indicated by the long Ag-C bond lengths and the nearly unperturbed nature of the arene.

By metal vapor synthesis, metal atoms co-condensed with arenes react to give complexes of the type M(arene)_{2}. Cr(C_{6}H_{6})_{2} can be produced by this method.

Cr(CO)_{6} reacts directly with benzene and other arenes to give the piano stool complexes Cr(C_{6}R_{6})(CO)_{3}. The carbonyls of Mo and W behave comparably. The method works particularly well with electron-rich arenes (e.g., anisole, mesitylene). The reaction has been extended to the synthesis of [Mn(C_{6}R_{6})(CO)_{3}]^{+}:

BrMn(CO)_{5} + Ag^{+} + C_{6}R_{6} → [Mn(C_{6}R_{6})(CO)_{3}]^{+} + AgBr + 2 CO

=== From hexadienes ===
Few Ru(II) and Os(II) complexes react directly with arenes. Instead, arene complexes of these metals are typically prepared by treatment of M(III) precursors with cyclohexadienes. For example, heating alcohol solutions of 1,3- or 1,4-cyclohexadiene and ruthenium trichloride gives (benzene)ruthenium dichloride dimer. The conversion entails dehydrogenation of an intermediate diene complex.

=== Alkyne trimerization ===
Metal complexes are known to catalyze alkyne trimerization to give arenes. These reactions have been used to prepare arene complexes. Illustrative is the reaction of [Co(mesitylene)_{2}]^{+} with 2-butyne to give [Co(C_{6}Me_{6})_{2}]^{+}.

== Structure ==
In most of its complexes, arenes bind in an η^{6} mode, with six nearly equidistant M-C bonds. The C-C-C angles are unperturbed vs the parent arene, but the C-C bonds are elongated by 0.2 Å. In the fullerene complex Ru_{3}(CO)_{9}(C_{60}), the fullerene binds to the triangular face of the cluster.

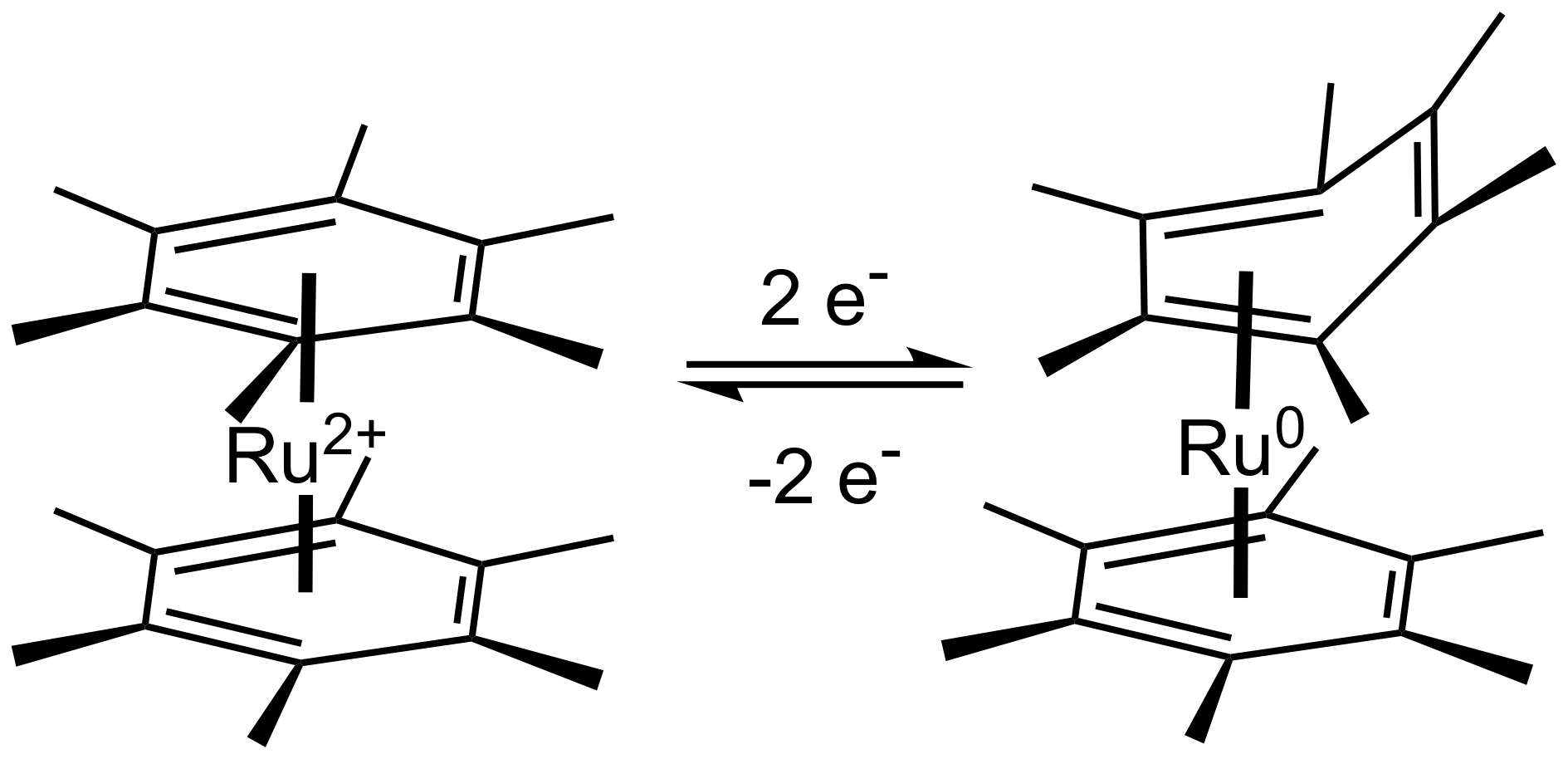
Hapticity change for bis(hexamethylbenzene)ruthenium

=== η^{4}- and η^{2}-Arene complexes ===
In some complexes, the arene binds through only two or four carbons, η^{2} and η^{4} bonding, respectively. In these cases, the arene is no longer planar. Because the arene is dearomatized, the uncoordinated carbon centers display enhanced reactivity. A well studied example is [Ru(η^{6}-C_{6}Me_{6})(η^{4}-C_{6}Me_{6})]^{0}, formed by the reduction of [Ru(η^{6}-C_{6}Me_{6})_{2}]^{2+}. An example of an [Os(η^{2}-C_{6}H_{6})(NH_{3})_{5})]^{2+}.

== Reactivity ==
When bound in the η^{6} manner, arenes often function as unreactive spectator ligands, as illustrated by several homogeneous catalysts used for transfer hydrogenation, such as (η^{6}-C_{6}R_{6})Ru(TsDPEN). In cationic arene complexes or those supported by several CO ligands, the arene is susceptible to attack by nucleophiles to give cyclohexadienyl derivatives.

Particularly from the perspective of organic synthesis, the decomplexation of arenes is of interest. Decomplexation can often be induced by treatment with excess of ligand (MeCN, CO, etc).
