= 4-Chloro-2-pentene =

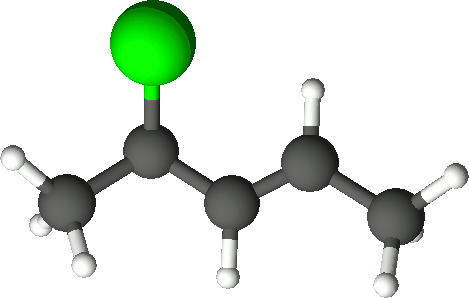

Names
- Preferred IUPAC name 4-Chloropent-2-ene

Identifiers
CAS Number	1458-99-7
3D model (JSmol)	Interactive image
ChemSpider	4517784
PubChem CID	5365840
CompTox Dashboard (EPA)	DTXSID401350399
- InChI: InChI=1S/C5H9Cl/c1-3-4-5(2)6/h3-5H,1-2H3/b4-3+ Key: FKKCIOTUMHPTSB-ONEGZZNKSA-N; InChI=1S/C5H9Cl/c1-3-4-5(2)6/h3-5H,1-2H3/b4-3+ Key: FKKCIOTUMHPTSB-ONEGZZNKSA-N
- SMILES: CC=CC(C)Cl

Properties
Chemical formula	C_{5}H_{9}Cl
Molar mass	104.58 g·mol^{−1}
Appearance	liquid
Density	0.8988 g/cm^{3} at 20 °C
Boiling point	97 °C (207 °F; 370 K)
Refractive index (n_{D})	1.4322
- Except where otherwise noted, data are given for materials in their standard state (at 25 °C [77 °F], 100 kPa). verify (what is ?) Infobox references

4-Chloro-2-pentene is an organic compound with the formula C_{5}H_{9}Cl. Its molecule is a linear chain of five carbon atoms, with a double bond between carbons 2 and 3 and a chlorine attached to carbon 4.

== Synthesis ==
4-Chloro-2-pentene can be synthesized from its corresponding alcohol (3-pentene-2-ol) or from 1,3-pentadiene. In the latter case, 4-chloro-2-pentene can be obtained with a yield of 97%.

== Uses ==
4-Chloro-2-pentene has been used to prepare quaternary ammonium salts based on N,N,N',N'-tetramethyldiaminomethane, an intermediate in the manufacture of ionol (2,6-di-tert-butyl-4-methylphenol).

4-Chloro-2-pentene readily reacts with stannyl lithium at low temperature to provide respective allyl stannanes. Likewise, allyl silanes can be prepared from 4-chloro-2-pentene by silylation of the corresponding Grignard reagents with an appropriate chlorosilane.
