= Whiting reaction =

Chemical reaction

The Whiting reaction is an organic reaction converting a propargyl diol into a diene using lithium aluminium hydride.

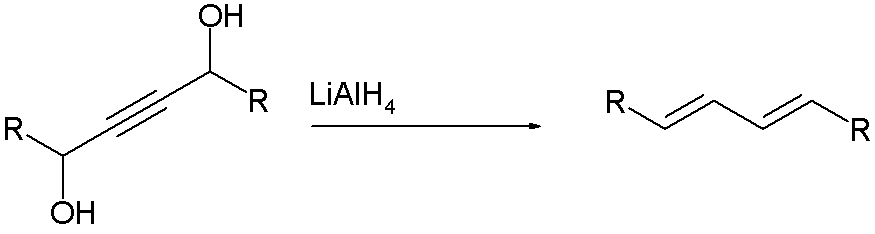
Whiting reaction

This organic reduction has been applied in the synthesis of fecapentaene, a suspected cause of colon cancer:

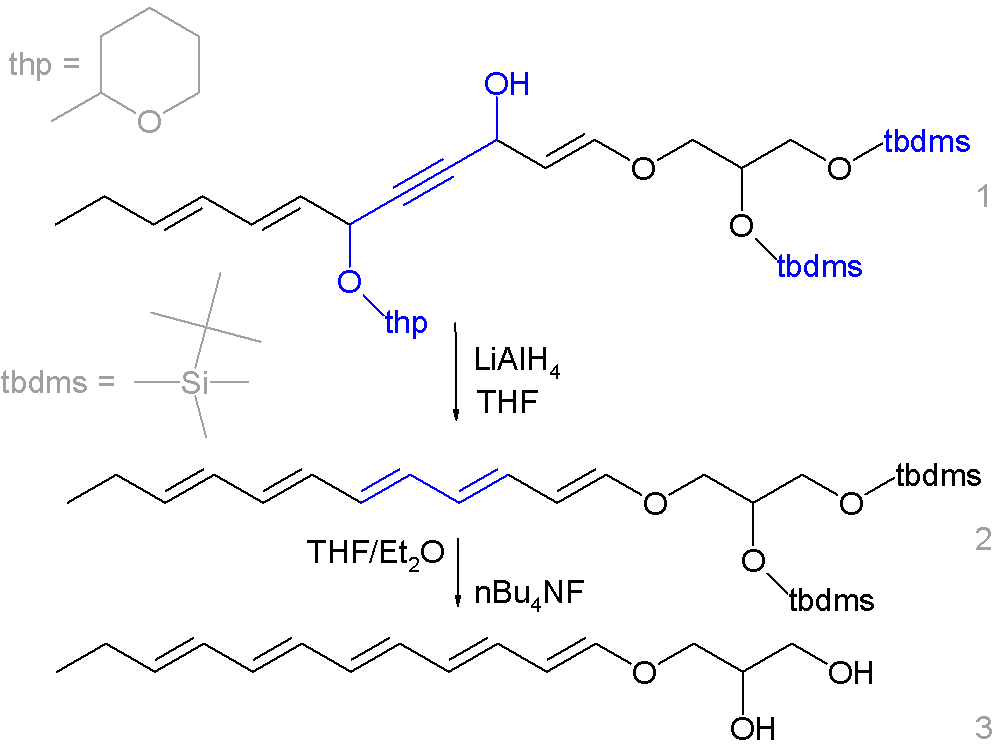

Protecting groups are tetrahydropyranyl and TBSMS; the final step is deprotection with tetra-n-butylammonium fluoride.
