= Organomolybdenum chemistry =

Chemistry of compounds with Mo-C bonds

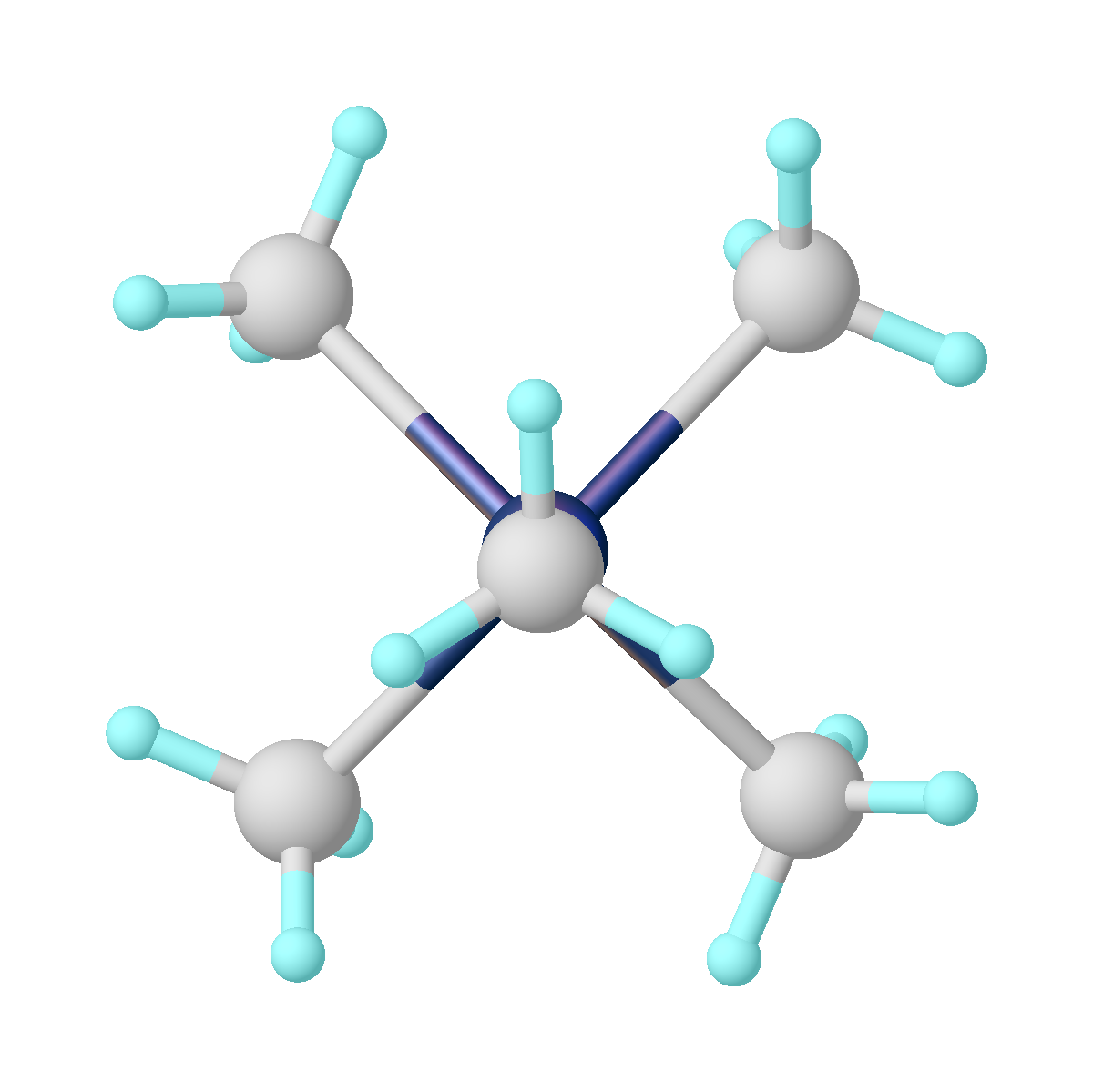
Structure of Mo(CH_{3})_{5}, a simple organomolybdenum compound.

Organomolybdenum chemistry is the chemistry of chemical compounds with Mo-C bonds. The heavier group 6 elements molybdenum and tungsten form organometallic compounds similar to those in organochromium chemistry but higher oxidation states tend to be more common.

== Mo(0) and more reduced states ==
Molybdenum hexacarbonyl is the precursor to many substituted derivatives. It reacts with organolithium reagents to give anionic acyls which can be O-alkylated to give Fischer carbenes.

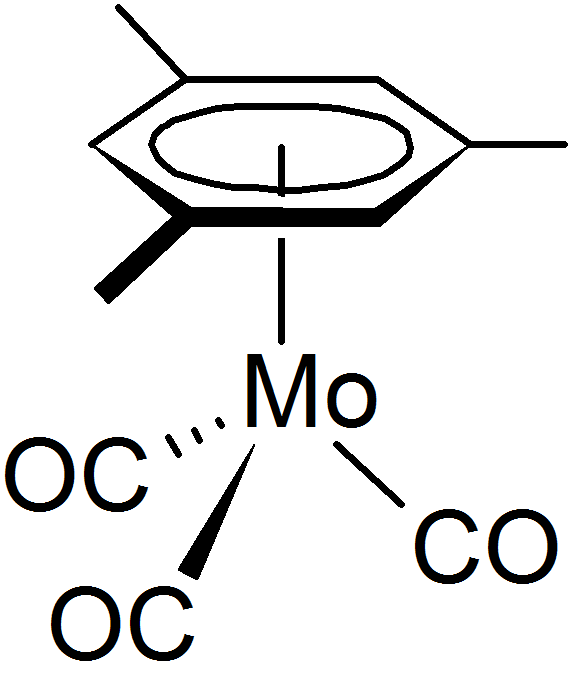
Structure of (mesitylene)molybdenum tricarbonyl.

Mo(CO)_{6} reacts with arenes to give piano-stool complexes such as (mesitylene)molybdenum tricarbonyl. Cycloheptatrienemolybdenum tricarbonyl, which is related to (arene)Mo(CO)_{3}, reacts with trityl salts to give the cycloheptatrienyl complex:

(C_{7}H_{8})Mo(CO)_{3} + (C_{6}H_{5})_{3}C^{+} → [(C_{7}H_{7})Mo(CO)_{3}]^{+} + (C_{6}H_{5})_{3}CH

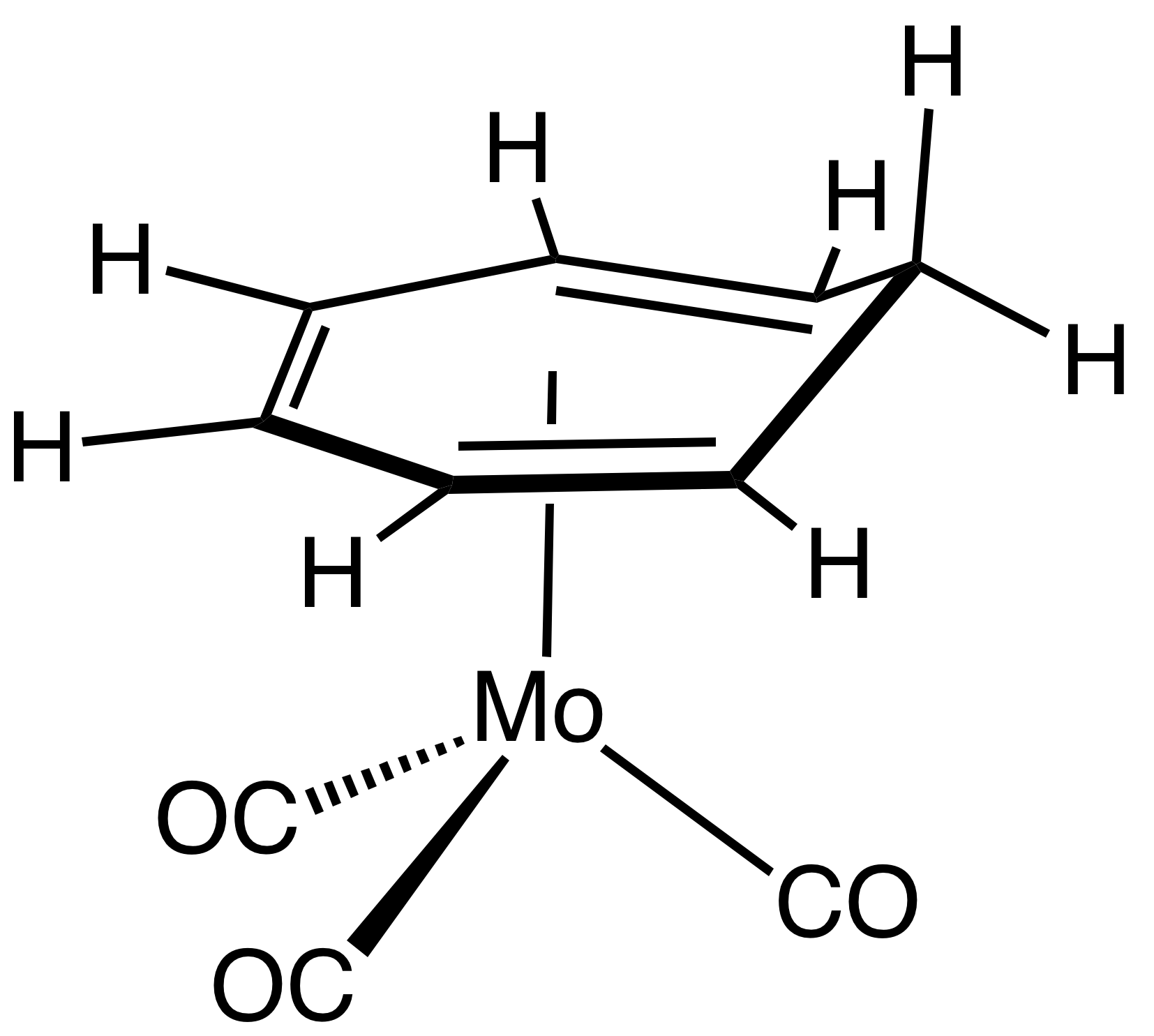
Structure of Cycloheptatrienemolybdenum tricarbonyl.

Reduction of Mo(CO)_{6} gives [Mo(CO)_{5}]^{2−} which is formally Mo(-II).

CO-free Mo(0) compounds tend to be more reducing and kinetically labile than the carbonyl complexes. Examples include bis(benzene)molybdenum (Mo(C_{6}H_{6})_{2}) and tris(butadiene)molybdenum. Such compounds can be prepared by metal vapor synthesis and reductive routes from molybdenum(V) chloride.

== Mo(II) ==
Halogenation of Mo(CO)_{6} gives Mo(II) carbonyl halides, which are also versatile precursors. One large collection of compounds have the formula (C_{5}R_{5})Mo(CO)_{3}X, derived from cyclopentadienylmolybdenum tricarbonyl dimer (X = halide, hydride, alkyl).

Treating molybdenum(II) acetate with methyllithium gives Li_{4}[Mo_{2}(CH_{3})_{8}].

== Mo(IV) ==
With the formula of the type Cp_{2}MoX_{2} molybdocene dichloride (X = Cl) and molybdocene dihydride (X = H) are both known as are ansa metallocene analogues.

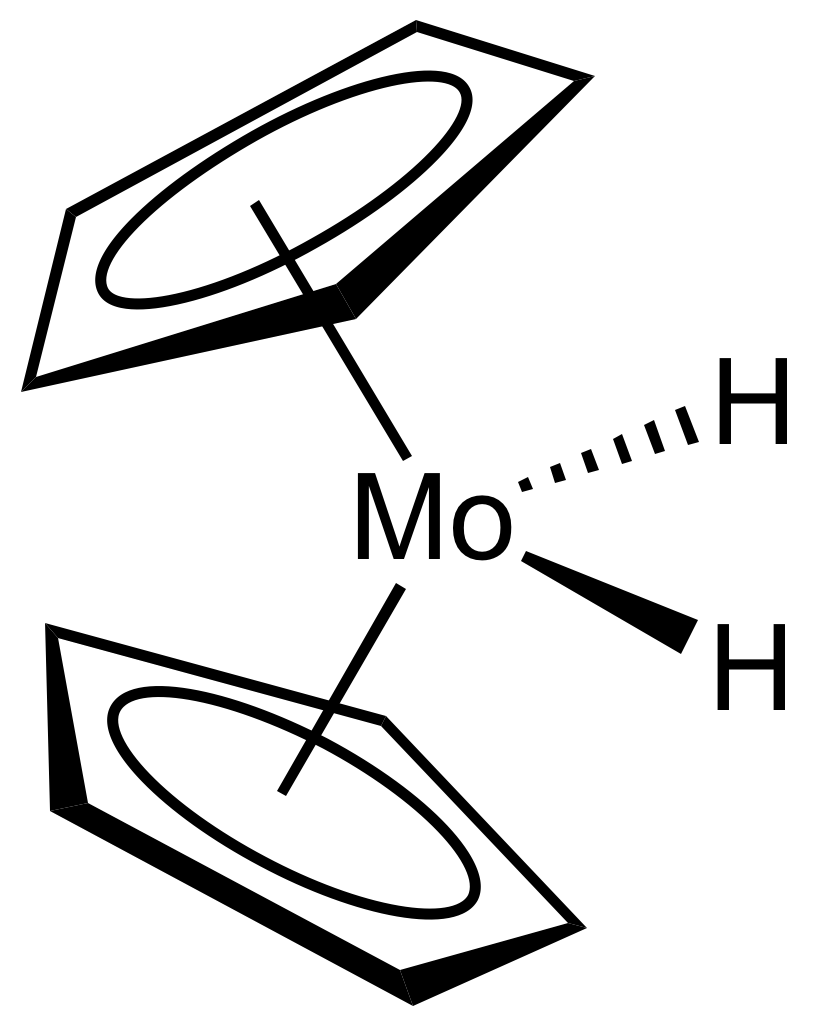
Molybdocene dihydride.

== Mo(V) and Mo(VI) ==
Mo(CH_{3})_{5}, Mo(CH_{3})_{6}, and salts of [Mo(CH_{3})_{7}]^{−} are known.

Oxo and imide (RN=) ligands are found in several high oxidation state organomolybdenum compounds. The complexes (C_{5}R_{5})MoO_{2}X are illustrative. Schrock's Mo-based olefin metathesis catalysts feature molybdenum(VI) centers supported by alkoxide, alkylidene, and imido ligands.

Molybdenum neopentylidyne complexes endowed with sterically demanding phenolates or branched fluorinated alkoxides catalyze alkyne metathesis. However, preparation of these catalysts is problematic by the standard Schrock procedure. The trisalkoxide species 17 is active at room temperature.

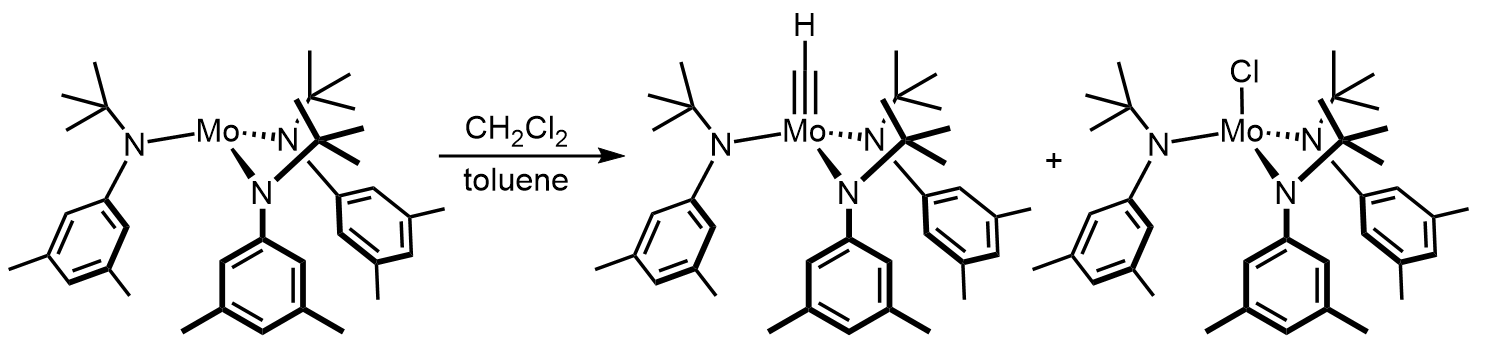

Treating these Mo(III) complexes with dichloromethane gives methylidyne complex and a monochloride. The alkylidene complex tolerates basic amines and sulfides, which deactivate the more Lewis acidic complex such as Schrock complex. Higher gem-dichlorides RCHCl_{2} give longer-lived catalyst. To reconvert the chloride byproduct, they added magnesium in reaction. The p-nitrophenolate is a very active catalyst. On the other hand, alcoholysis of 21 with a tridentate ligand leading to still longer lifetime and better substrate scope.

Molybdenum nitride complexes with siloxide ligands are precatalysts for alkyne metathesis.

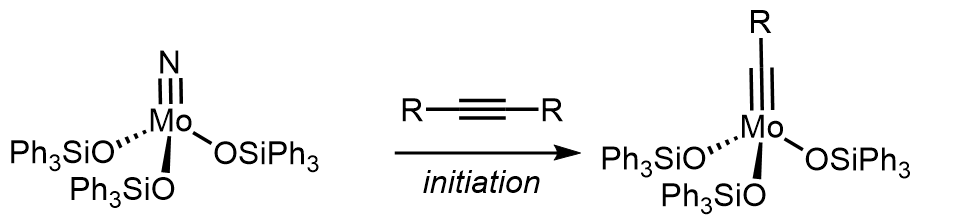

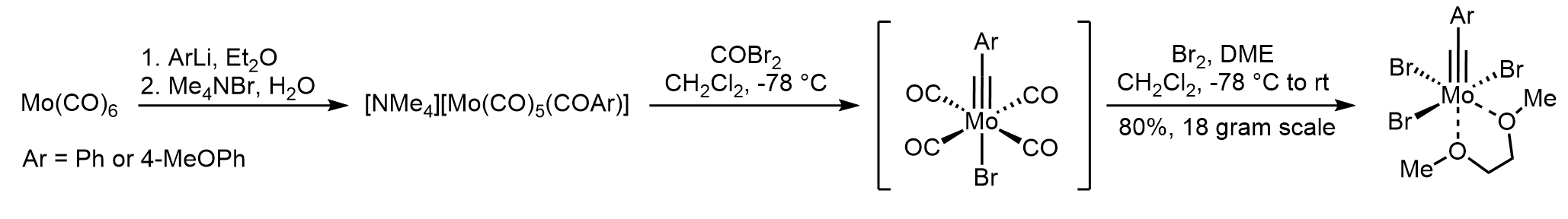

== Potential applications ==
Mo-based catalysts are active for olefin metathesis.

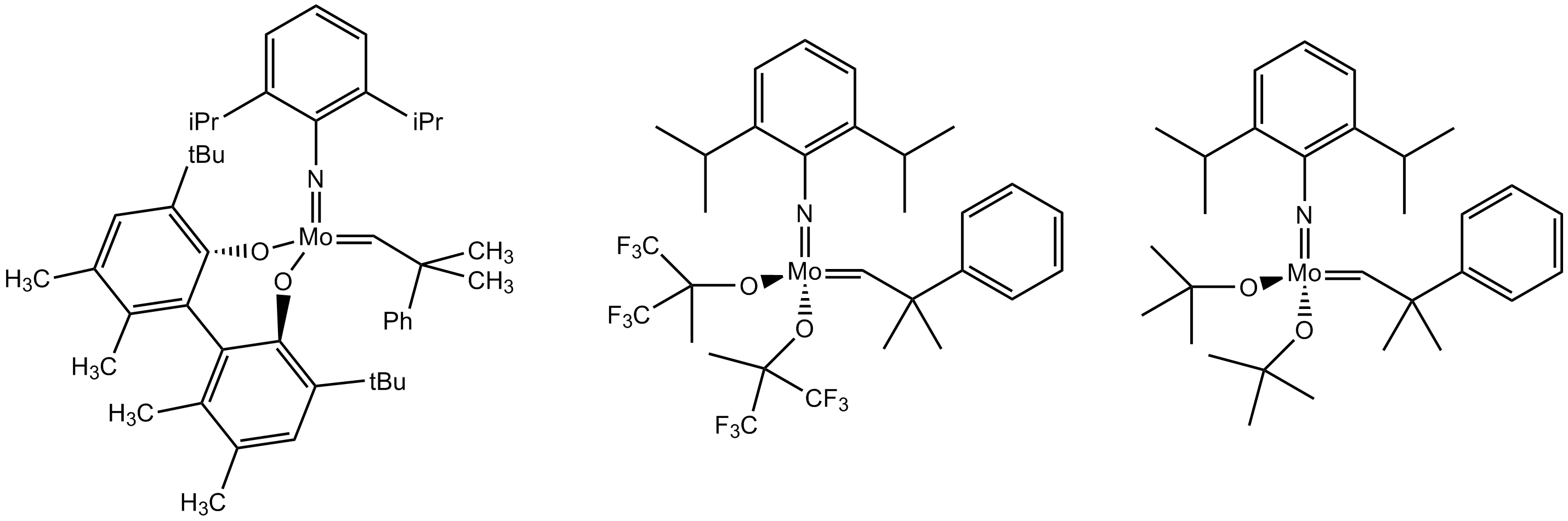
Some commercially available Schrock catalysts.

Trisamidomolybdenum(VI) alkylidyne complexes catalyze alkyne metathesis.

In the Kauffmann olefination, molybdenum(III) chloride and methyllithium form an organometallic complex capable of carbonyl olefination.
