= Cycloheptatrienemolybdenum tricarbonyl =

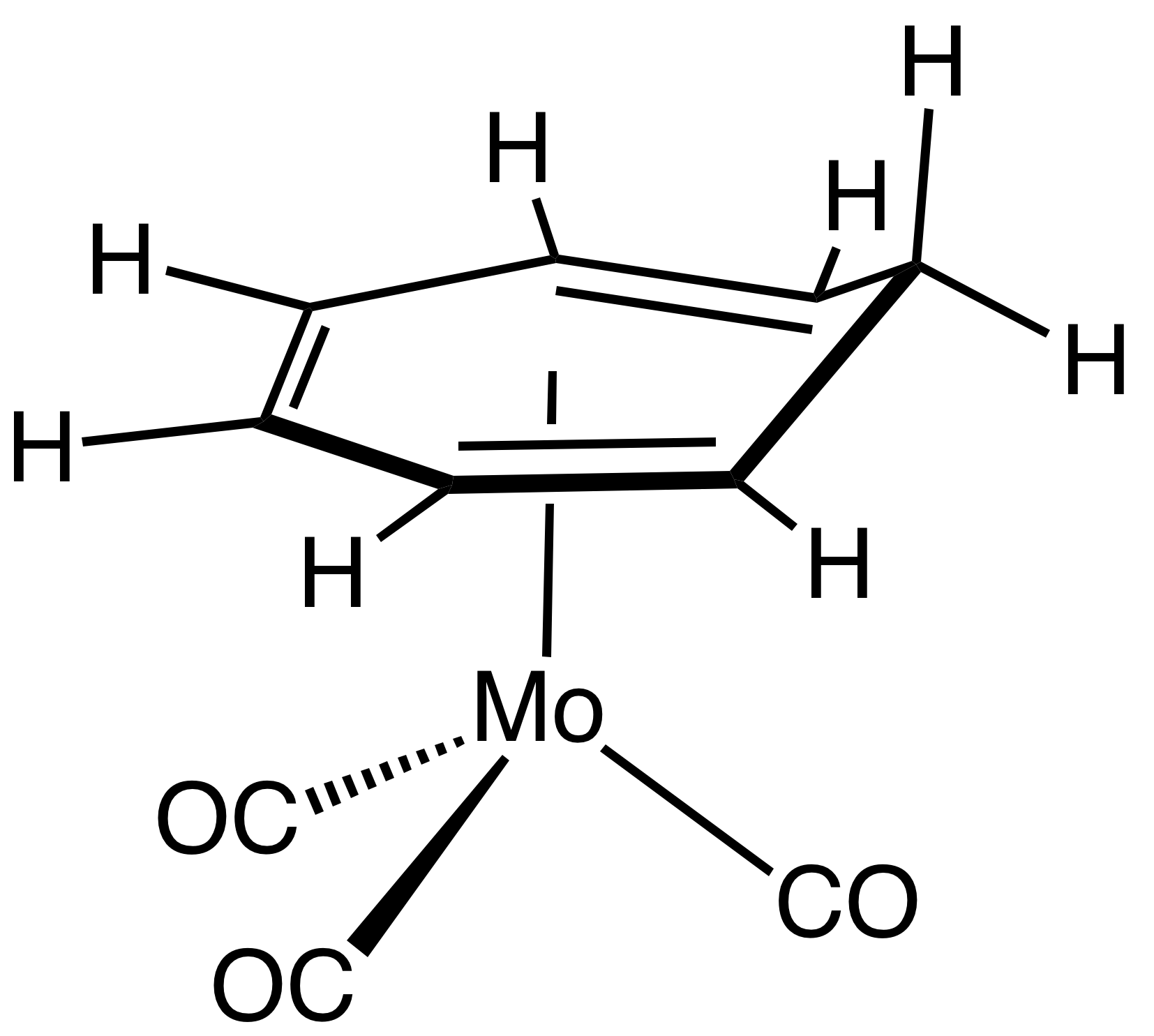

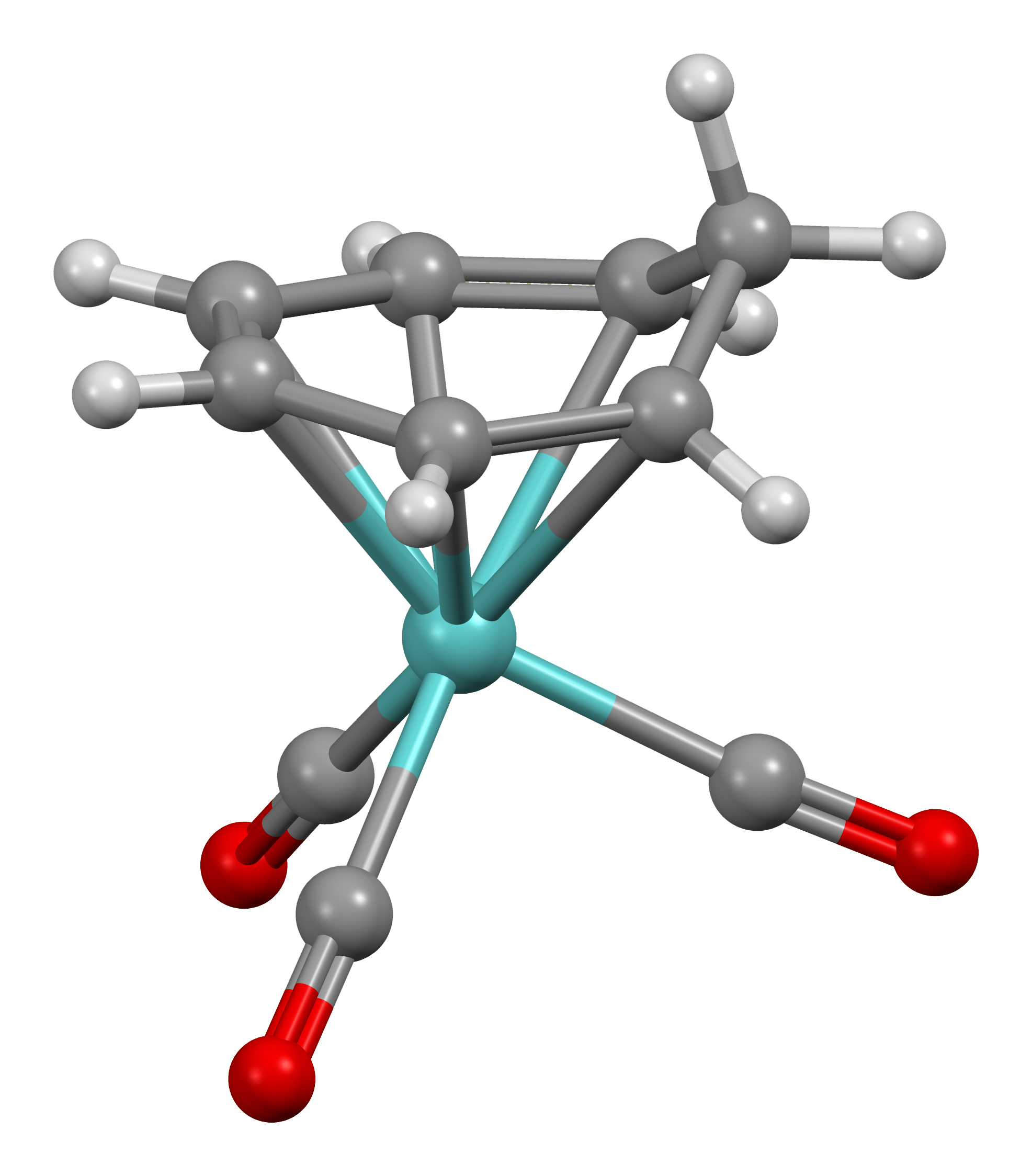

Identifiers
CAS Number	12125-77-8
3D model (JSmol)	Interactive image
ChemSpider	9890723
PubChem CID	11716002
UNII	FU8MQE58TD
- InChI: InChI=1S/C7H8.3CO.Mo/c1-2-4-6-7-5-3-1;3*1-2;/h1-6H,7H2;;;; Key: WQAVHVQYKSYTII-UHFFFAOYSA-N
- SMILES: [C-]#[O+].[C-]#[O+].[C-]#[O+].C1C=CC=CC=C1.[Mo]

Properties
Chemical formula	C_{10}H_{8}MoO_{3}
Molar mass	272.12 g·mol^{−1}
Appearance	red-orange solid
Density	1.81 g/cm^{3}
Melting point	100–101 °C (212–214 °F; 373–374 K)
- Except where otherwise noted, data are given for materials in their standard state (at 25 °C [77 °F], 100 kPa). Infobox references

Cycloheptatrienemolybdenum tricarbonyl is the organomolybdenum compound with the formula (C_{7}H_{8})Mo(CO)_{3}. It is a red-orange solid that is soluble in nonpolar organic solvents. The compound has no practical value but is a prototypical complex of cycloheptatriene.

== Synthesis, structure, and reactions ==
The compound is prepared by thermal reaction of the triene with molybdenum hexacarbonyl:

C_{7}H_{8} + Mo(CO)_{6} → (C_{7}H_{8})Mo(CO)_{3} + 3 CO

The compound is a piano stool complex, consisting of Mo(CO)_{3} bound to six carbon centers of the triene. The methylene group projects from the plane of the six coordinated carbon atoms.

The compound reacts with trityl salts to give the cycloheptatrienyl complex:

(C_{7}H_{8})Mo(CO)_{3} + (C_{6}H_{5})_{3}C^{+} → [(C_{7}H_{7})Mo(CO)_{3}]^{+} + (C_{6}H_{5})_{3}CH
