= Molybdocene dihydride =

Organomolybdenum compound

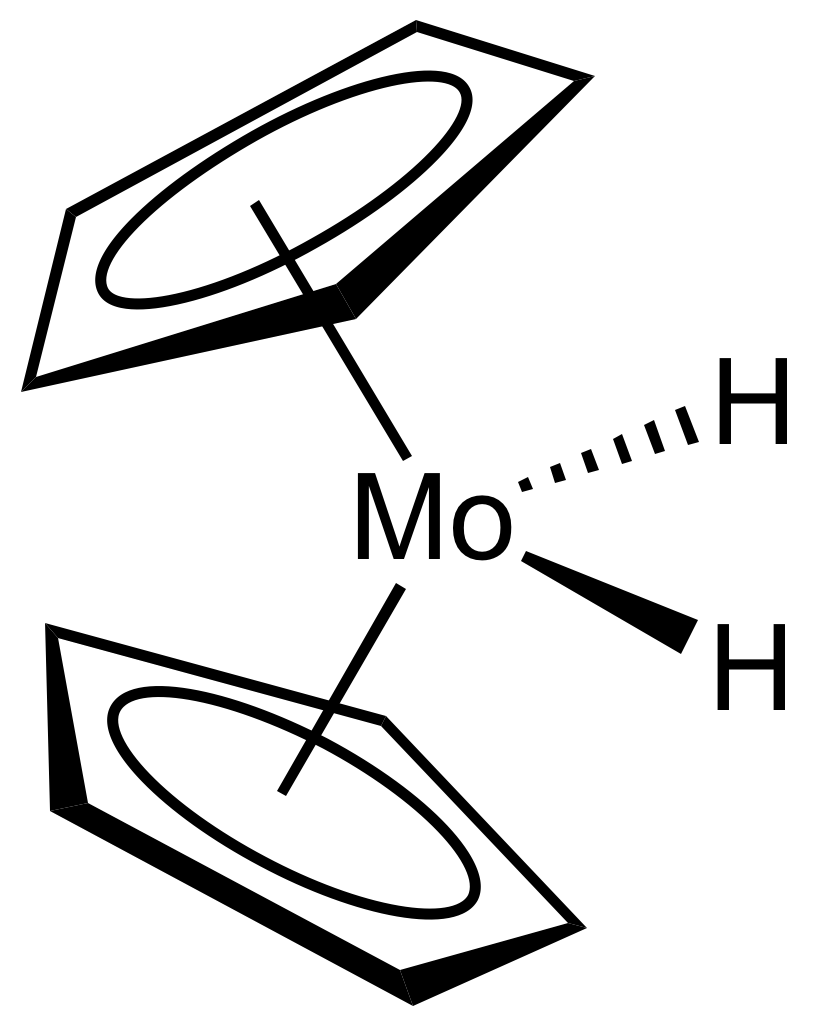

Names
- Other names dihydridobis(cyclopentadienyl)molybdenum(IV)

Identifiers
| CAS Number | 1291-40-3 |
| 3D model (JSmol) | Interactive image |
| PubChem CID | 11984635 |
- InChI: InChI=1S/2C5H5.Mo.2H/c2*1-2-4-5-3-1;;;/h2*1-5H;;;/q-5;-1;;; Key: QCRPIEJRQZHDSX-UHFFFAOYSA-N
- SMILES: [cH-]1cccc1.[cH-]1cccc1.[H][Mo+2][H]

Properties
| Chemical formula | C_{10}H_{12}Mo |
| Molar mass | 228.16 g·mol^{−1} |
| Appearance | yellow-brown powder |
| Melting point | 163–165 °C (325–329 °F; 436–438 K) |
| Solubility in water | insoluble |
- Except where otherwise noted, data are given for materials in their standard state (at 25 °C [77 °F], 100 kPa). Infobox references

Molybdocene dihydride is the organomolybdenum compound with the formula (η^{5}-C_{5}H_{5})_{2}MoH_{2}. Commonly abbreviated as Cp_{2}MoH_{2}, it is a yellow air-sensitive solid that dissolves in some organic solvents.

The compound is prepared by combining molybdenum pentachloride, sodium cyclopentadienide, and sodium borohydride. The dihydride converts to molybdocene dichloride upon treatment with chloroform.

The compound adopts a "clamshell" structure where the Cp rings are not parallel.
