= Piperylene =

Hydrocarbon compound (CH3–CH=CH–CH=CH2)

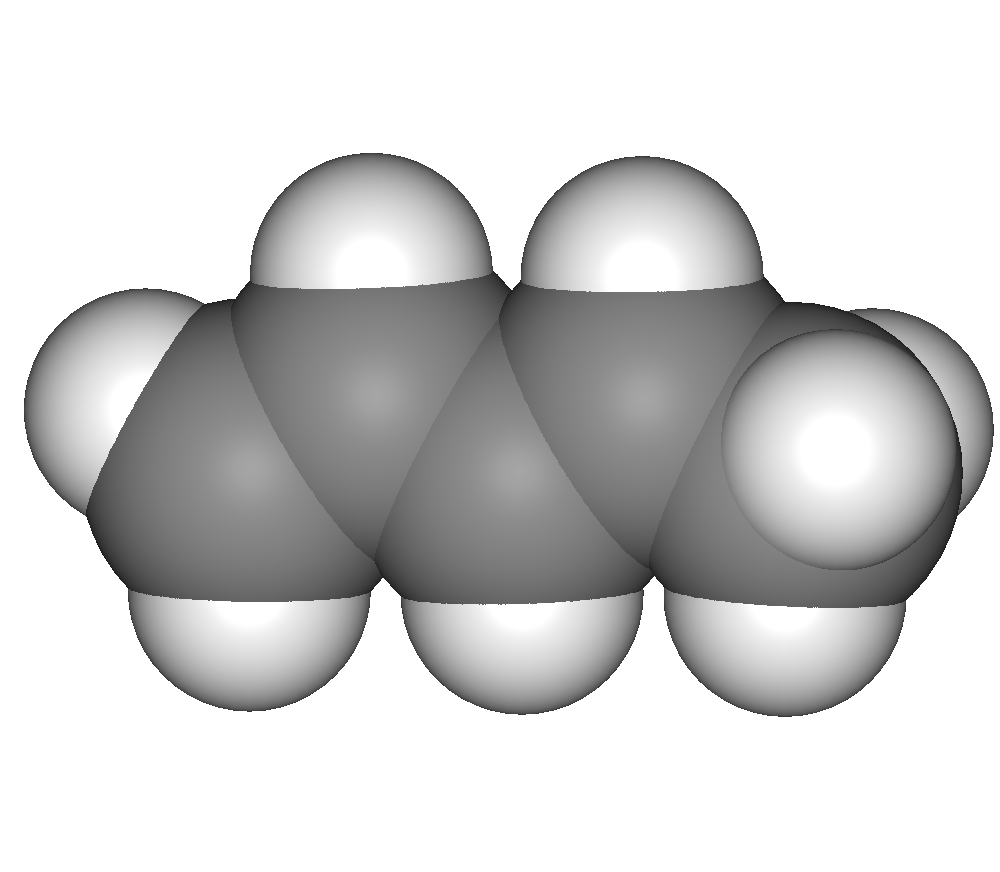

Names
- Preferred IUPAC name (3E)-Penta-1,3-diene

Identifiers
CAS Number	504-60-9; trans: 2004-70-8
3D model (JSmol)	Interactive image
ChEBI	CHEBI:74165
ChemSpider	56020
ECHA InfoCard	100.007.269
EC Number	207-995-2
PubChem CID	62204
RTECS number	RZ2464000
UNII	FW963NF88B
UN number	1993 3295 1010
CompTox Dashboard (EPA)	DTXSID3027160
- InChI: InChI=1S/C5H8/c1-3-5-4-2/h3-5H,1H2,2H3/b5-4+ Key: PMJHHCWVYXUKFD-SNAWJCMRSA-N; InChI=1/C5H8/c1-3-5-4-2/h3-5H,1H2,2H3/b5-4+ Key: PMJHHCWVYXUKFD-SNAWJCMRBX
- SMILES: C/C=C/C=C

Properties
Chemical formula	C_{5}H_{8}
Molar mass	68.117 g/mol
Appearance	Colorless liquid
Density	0.683 g/cm^{3}
Melting point	−87 °C (−125 °F; 186 K) E-isomer
Boiling point	42 °C (108 °F; 315 K) E-isomer

Hazards
- GHS labelling
Pictograms	(GHS02: Flammable) (GHS07: Exclamation mark) (GHS08: Health hazard)
Signal word	Danger
Hazard statements	H225, H304, H315, H319, H335
Precautionary statements	P210, P233, P240, P241, P242, P243, P261, P264, P271, P280, P301+P310, P302+P352, P303+P361+P353, P304+P340, P305+P351+P338, P312, P321, P331, P332+P313, P337+P313, P362, P370+P378, P403+P233, P403+P235, P405, P501
Flash point	< −30 °C (−22 °F; 243 K)
- Except where otherwise noted, data are given for materials in their standard state (at 25 °C [77 °F], 100 kPa). verify (what is ?) Infobox references

Piperylene or 1,3-pentadiene is an organic compound with the formula CH_{3}−CH=CH−CH=CH_{2}. It is a volatile, flammable hydrocarbon. It is one of the five positional isomers of pentadiene. It is one of several industrially significant 1,3-dienes, but it has received much less attention than butadiene and isoprene. It consists of two isomers, Z and E, but these are rarely distinguished.

== Synthesis and formation ==
The dominant route to piperylene is by steam cracking of naphtha. This makes up about 10% of the C5 stream.

=== Other routes ===
Piperylene is a product of the decarboxylation of sorbic acid.

Piperylene is obtained as a byproduct of ethylene production from crude oil, combustion of biomass, waste incineration and exhaust gases. It is used as a monomer in the manufacturing of plastics, adhesives and resins.

== Reactions ==
Piperylene behaves as a typical diene. It forms a sulfolene upon treatment with sulfur dioxide. It participates in Ziegler-Natta polymerization. It is converted to 2-Methyltetrahydrofuran by reaction with water. It undergoes hydrocyanation.

Piperylene can be deprotonated using butyl lithium, providing lithium pentadienyl.

== See also ==
- Butadiene
- Cyclopentadiene
- Isoprene
