= (Mesitylene)molybdenum tricarbonyl =

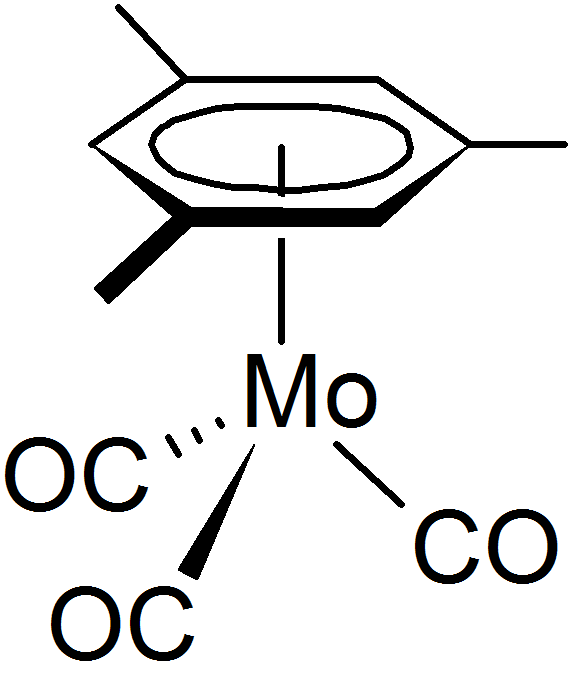

Names
- IUPAC name Tricarbonyl(1,3,5-trimethyl-η^{6}-benzene)molybdenum
- Other names Molybdenum, tricarbonyl[(1,2,3,4,5,6-η)-1,3,5-trimethylbenzene]- (9CI) Mesitylenemolybdenum tricarbonyl (6CI); Molybdenum, tricarbonyl(mesitylene)- (7CI,8CI); Benzene, 1,3,5-trimethyl-, molybdenum complex; (1,3,5-Trimethylbenzene)molybdenum tricarbonyl; Mesitylenetricarbonylmolybdenum; Tricarbonyl(1,3,5-trimethylbenzene)molybdenum; Tricarbonyl(mesitylene)molybdenum; Tricarbonyl(η-mesitylene)molybdenum; Tricarbonyl(η^{6}-1,3,5-trimethylbenzene)molybdenum; Tricarbonyl(η^{6}-mesitylene)molybdenum; (1,3,5-Trimethylbenzene) (molybdenum tricarbonyl)

Identifiers
CAS Number	12089-15-5
3D model (JSmol)	Interactive image
ChemSpider	9121724
PubChem CID	11987453
- InChI: InChI=1S/C9H12.3CO.Mo/c1-7-4-8(2)6-9(3)5-7;3*1-2;/h4-6H,1-3H3;;;; Key: IQUCQSPNTYHKKW-UHFFFAOYSA-N
- SMILES: CC1=CC(=CC(=C1)C)C.[C-]#[O+].[C-]#[O+].[C-]#[O+].[Mo]

Properties
Chemical formula	C_{12}H_{12}MoO_{3}
Molar mass	300.18 g·mol^{−1}
Density	1.455 g/cm^{3}

Structure
Crystal structure	Monoclinic
- Except where otherwise noted, data are given for materials in their standard state (at 25 °C [77 °F], 100 kPa). verify (what is ?) Infobox references

(Mesitylene)molybdenum tricarbonyl is an organomolybdenum compound derived from the aromatic compound mesitylene (1,3,5-trimethylbenzene) and molybdenum carbonyl. It exists as pale yellow crystals, which are soluble in organic solvents but decompose when in solution. It has been examined as a catalyst and reagent.

== Synthesis ==
(Mesitylene)molybdenum tricarbonyl arises from the reaction of molybdenum hexacarbonyl with hot mesitylene:

Mo(CO)_{6} + (CH_{3})_{3}C_{6}H_{3} → Mo(CO)_{3}[(CH_{3})_{3}C_{6}H_{3}] + 3 CO

It can also be synthesized, with good yields by displacement of pyridine ligands of the trispyridine complex Mo(CO)_{3}(pyridine)_{3} in the presence of Lewis acids. This reaction proceeds at lower temperatures of the compound than the direct method

Py_{3}Mo(CO)_{3} + (CH_{3})_{3}C_{6}H_{3} + 3BF_{3}·O(C_{2}H_{5})_{2} → [(CH_{3})_{3}C_{6}H_{3}]Mo(CO)_{3} + 3PyBF_{3}

== Structure and properties ==
The mesitylene group is bonded to the molybdenum centre through delocalized π - electron ring. The aromaticity of the ligand is indicated by its ability to undergo Friedel-Crafts reactions, e.g. with acetyl chloride. Such reactions are slower on the tricarbonyl(mesitylene)molybdenum than benzene, which suggests that the electron density contributes to the bonding to the molybdenum.

The tricarbonyl(mesitylene)molybdenum complex adopts a near C_{3v} symmetry with the three carbonyl groups occupying an eclipsed arrangement relative to the three methyl groups. The mesityl group is η^{6} to the molybdenum central metal atom, which lies 0.009 Å away from the ring centre and the methyl groups on the benzene are bent out of plane by 0.035 Å due to steric interaction with the carbonyl groups.

== Reactions ==
The arene can be displaced by the trimethylphosphite via a S_{N}2 type mechanism to give the fac-tricarbonyltris(trimethyl phosphite)molybdenum.

(CH_{3}O)_{3}P + [(CH_{3})_{3}C_{6}H_{3}]Mo(CO)_{3} → fac-[(CH_{3}O)_{3}P]_{3}Mo(CO)_{3} + (CH_{3})_{3}C_{6}H_{3}

The tricarbonyl(mesitylene)molybdenum complex can be used an electron donor.

Tricarbonyl(mesitylene)molybdenum can act as a catalyst for the polymerisation of phenylacetylene. The Molybdenum complex is activated with an oxidant such as chloranil. The result of the charge transfer facilitates ring slippage and the mesitylene group changes from η^{6} to η^{2} this allows the phenylacetylene monomer units to bind to the metal centre. Recently, it has been reported that tricarbonyl(mesitylene)molybdenum can act as a catalyst for the epoxidation of alkenes.
