= Decomplexation =

Chemical process

In chemistry, decomplexation refers to the removal of a ligand from a coordination complex. Decomplexation is of particular interest when the ligand has been synthesized within the coordination sphere of the metal, as is often the case in organometallic chemistry.

== Decomplexation by ligand displacement ==
Ligands can be decomplexed by displacement with another ligand, e.g., a highly basic ligand or the use of high pressures of carbon monoxide. Arenes are liberated from (arene)Cr(CO)_{3} with pyridine:

(arene)Cr(CO)_{3} + 3 C_{5}H_{5}N → Cr(CO)_{3}(NC_{5}H_{5})_{3} + arene

In this case Cr(CO)_{3}(pyridine)_{3} can be recycled. Illustrative of this approach is the synthesis of (–)-steganone via a chromium haloarene complex. The synthesis is completed by decomplexation, liberating the natural product.

(16)

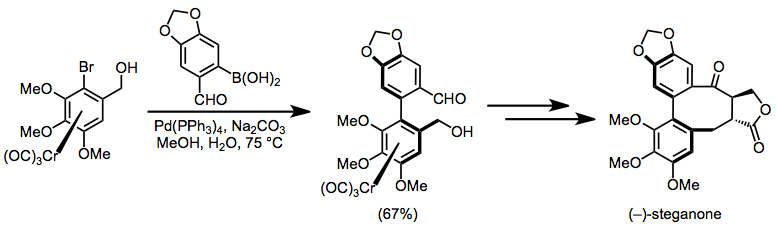

1,4,7-Trithiacyclononane can be prepared within the coordination sphere of a metal, and then isolated by decomplexation.

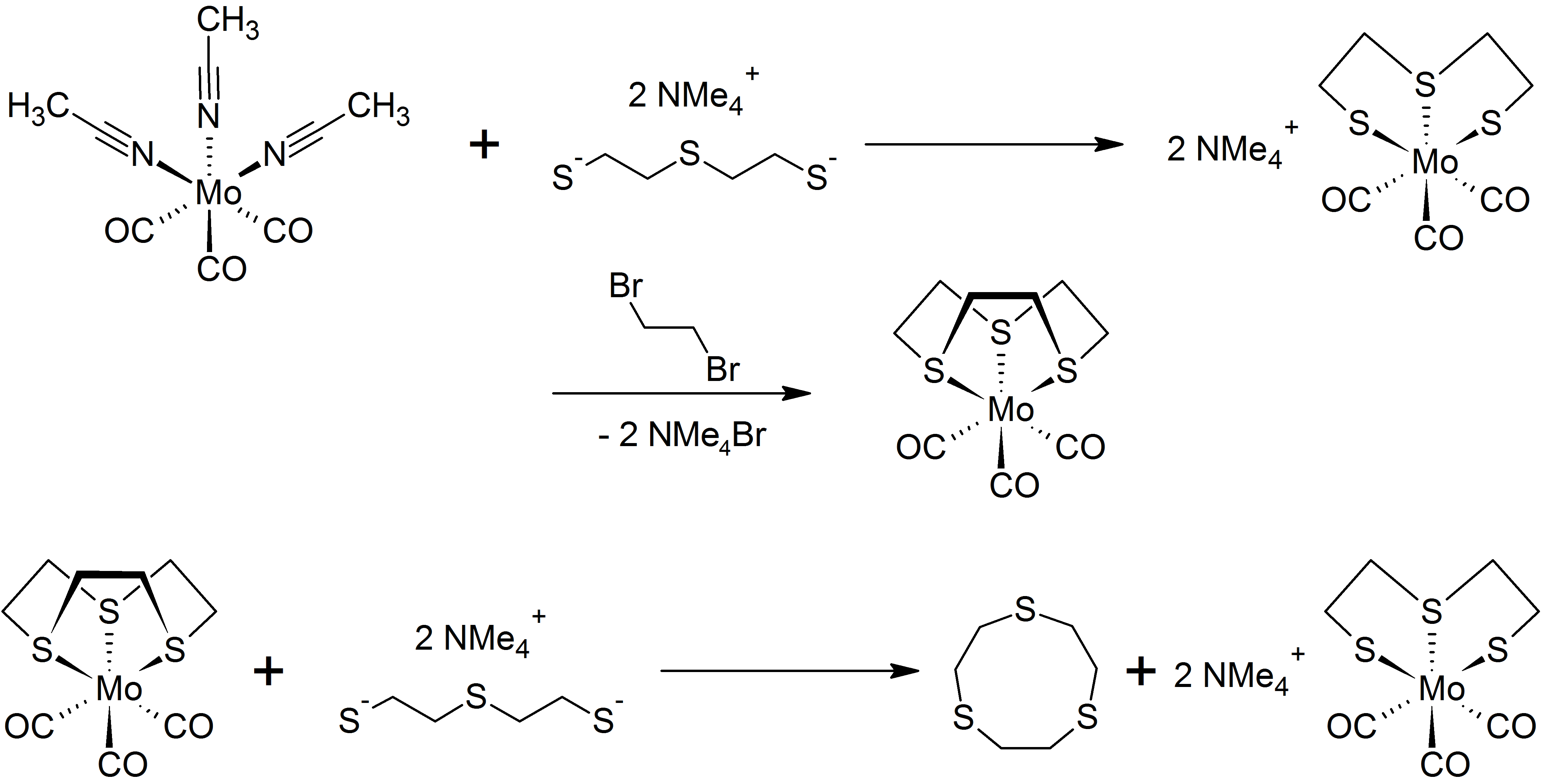

== Oxidative decomplexation ==
Another popular method for decomplexation involves oxidation of a low valent complex. Oxidants include air, dioxirane, ceric ammonium nitrate (CAN), and halogens. Oxidants are selected to avoid reaction with the released organic ligand. Illustrative is the use of ferric chloride to release alkynes from Co_{2}(C_{2}R_{2})(CO)_{6}. One drawback to this method is that the organometallic center is usually destroyed. One example of oxidative decomplexation involves the CAN-induced release and trapping of cyclobutadiene from cyclobutadieneiron tricarbonyl.
