= Pentadienyl =

In organic chemistry, pentadienyl refers to the unsaturated five-carbon chain with the formula C_{5}H_{7}. Three versions are discussed, all formally derived from 1,4-or 1,3-pentadiene C_{5}H_{8}:

- pentadienyl radical with the formula H_{2}CCHCHCHCH_{2}
- pentadienyl anion with the formula H_{2}CCHCHCHCH^{−}_{2}, an approximate description of pentadienyl lithium and related species.
- pentadienyl cation with the formula H_{2}CCHCHCHCH^{+}_{2}, which is rarely invoked carbocation.

The situation is closely related to the allyl (C_{3}H_{5}) derivatives, which also are discussed in three states, being derived from propylene.

== Production and structure ==
=== Pentadienyl "anion" ===
1,4-or 1,3-Pentadiene can be deprotonated with butyl lithium, providing lithium pentadienyl.

=== Pentadienyl radical ===
Pentadienyl radicals are intermediates in the degradation of 1,4-dienes, as found in some fats. Like the pentadienyl anions, the radicals are planar.

== Organometallic chemistry ==
In organometallic chemistry, the pentadienyl anion is a ligand, the acyclic analogue of the more-common cyclopentadienyl anion. The pentadienyl anion is generated by deprotonation of pentadiene. A number of complexes are known, including bis(pentadienyl) iron, Fe(C_{5}H_{7})_{2}, the "open" analog of ferrocene. Only few pentadienyl complexes feature simple C_{5}H_{7} ligands. More common is the dimethyl derivative 2,4-Me_{2}C_{5}H_{5}. Additionally, many pentadienyl ligands are cyclic, being derived from the addition of hydride to η^{6}-arene complexes or hydride abstraction from cyclohexadiene complexes.

The first pentadienyl complex to be reported was derived from protonolysis of a complex of pentadienol:

Fe(C_{5}H_{7}OH)(CO)_{3} + H^{+} → [Fe(C_{5}H_{7})(CO)_{3}]^{+} + H_{2}O

Treatment of this cation with sodium borohydride gives the pentadiene complex:

[Fe(C_{5}H_{7})(CO)_{3}]^{+} + H^{−} → Fe(C_{5}H_{8})(CO)_{3}
