= Cyclohexa-1,4-diene =

- Skeletal formula with all implicit hydrogen shown, skeletal formula; stereo, skeletal formula with all explicit hydrogens added, all of 1,4-cyclohexadiene

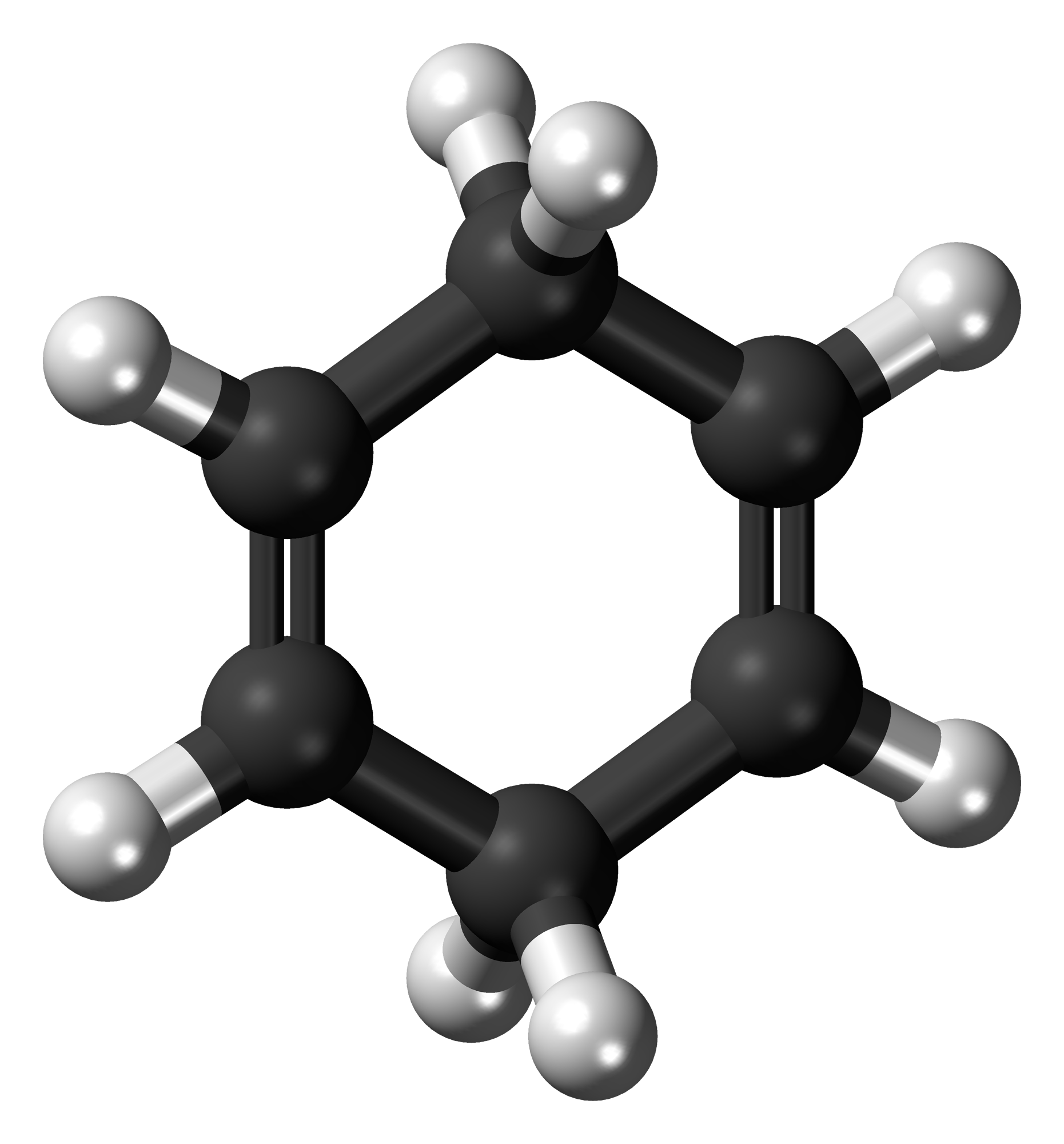

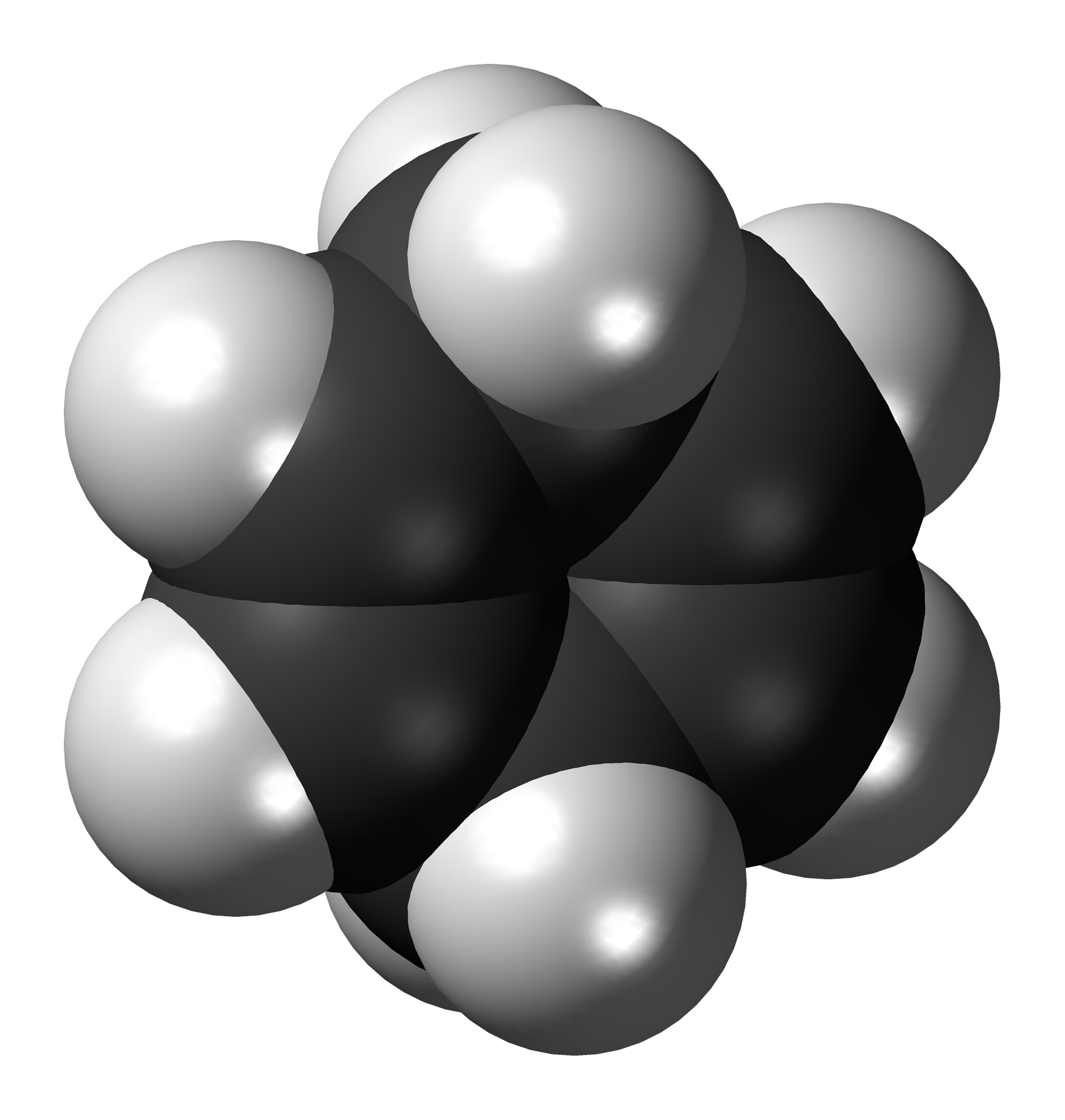

Names
- Preferred IUPAC name Cyclohexa-1,4-diene
- Other names 1,4-Cyclohexadiene; 1,4-Dihydrobenzene

Identifiers
CAS Number	628-41-1
3D model (JSmol)	Interactive image
Abbreviations	1,4-CHDN
Beilstein Reference	1900733
ChEBI	CHEBI:37611
ChemSpider	11838
ECHA InfoCard	100.010.040
EC Number	211-043-1
Gmelin Reference	1656
MeSH	1,4-cyclohexadiene
PubChem CID	12343
UNII	0F8Z5909QZ
UN number	3295
CompTox Dashboard (EPA)	DTXSID0060854
- InChI: InChI=1S/C6H8/c1-2-4-6-5-3-1/h1-2,5-6H,3-4H2 Key: UVJHQYIOXKWHFD-UHFFFAOYSA-N
- SMILES: C1C=CCC=C1

Properties
Chemical formula	C_{6}H_{8}
Molar mass	80.130 g·mol^{−1}
Appearance	Colorless liquid
Density	0.847 g cm^{−3}
Melting point	−50 °C; −58 °F; 223 K
Boiling point	82 °C; 179 °F; 355 K
Magnetic susceptibility (χ)	−48.7·10^{−6} cm^{3}/mol
Refractive index (n_{D})	1.472

Thermochemistry
Heat capacity (C)	142.2 J K^{−1} mol^{−1}
Std molar entropy (S^{⦵}_{298})	189.37 J K^{−1} mol^{−1}
Std enthalpy of formation (Δ_{f}H^{⦵}_{298})	63.0–69.2 kJ mol^{−1}
Std enthalpy of combustion (Δ_{c}H^{⦵}_{298})	−3573.5 – −3567.5 kJ mol^{−1}

Hazards
- GHS labelling
Pictograms	(GHS02: Flammable) (GHS08: Health hazard)
Signal word	Danger
Hazard statements	H225, H340, H350, H373
Precautionary statements	P201, P210, P308+P313
NFPA 704 (fire diamond)	2 3 0
Flash point	−7 °C (19 °F; 266 K)
- Except where otherwise noted, data are given for materials in their standard state (at 25 °C [77 °F], 100 kPa). verify (what is ?) Infobox references

Cyclohexa-1,4-diene is an organic compound with the formula C_{6}H_{8}. It is a colourless, flammable liquid that is of academic interest as a prototype of a large class of related compounds called terpenoids, an example being γ-terpinene. An isomer of this compound is 1,3-cyclohexadiene.

== Synthesis and reactions ==
In the laboratory, substituted 1,4-cyclohexadienes are synthesized by Birch reduction of related aromatic compounds using an alkali metal dissolved in liquid ammonia and a proton donor such as an alcohol. In this way, over reduction to the fully saturated ring is avoided. Alternatively, 1,4-cyclohexadienes are the Diels-Alder product of butadiene and an electron-poor alkyne.

1,4-Cyclohexadiene and its derivatives are easily aromatized, the driving force being the formation of an aromatic ring. The conversion to an aromatic system may be used to trigger other reactions, such as the Bergman cyclization.
