= Cyclohexa-1,3-diene =

Chemical compound

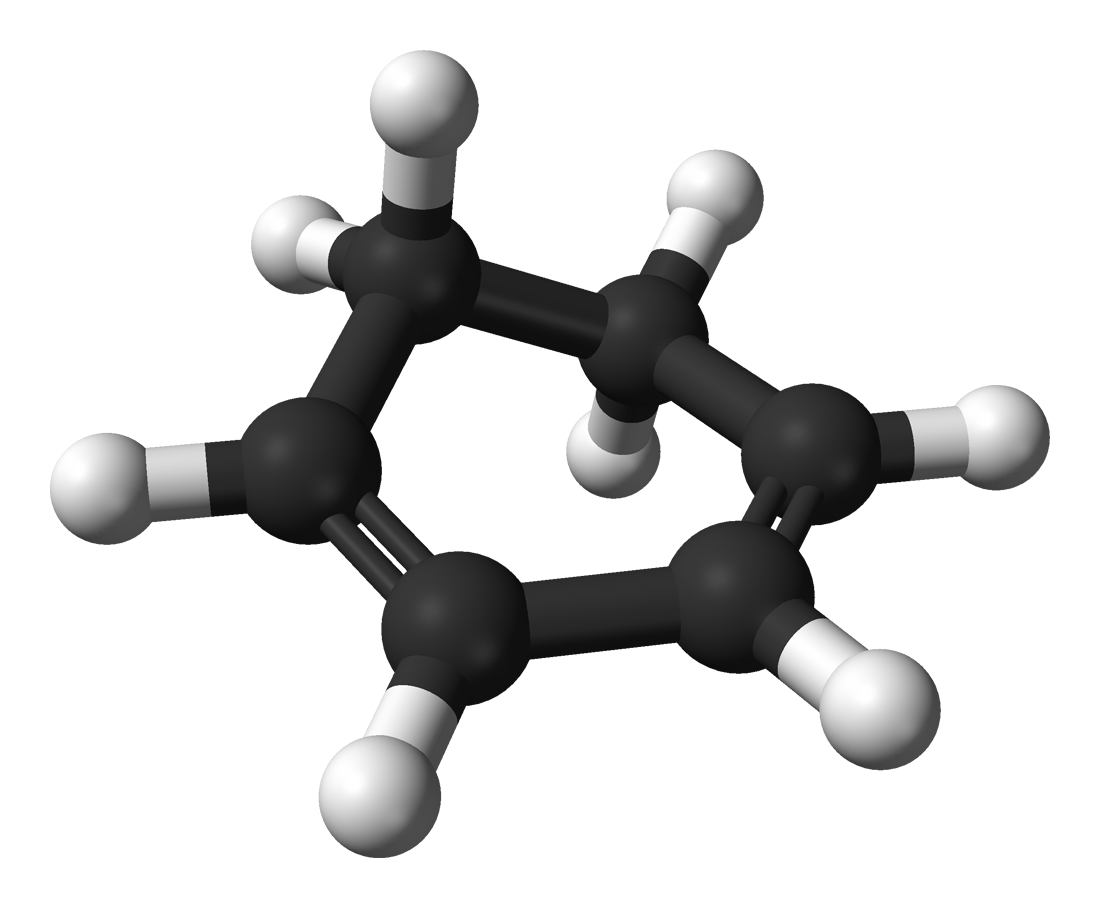

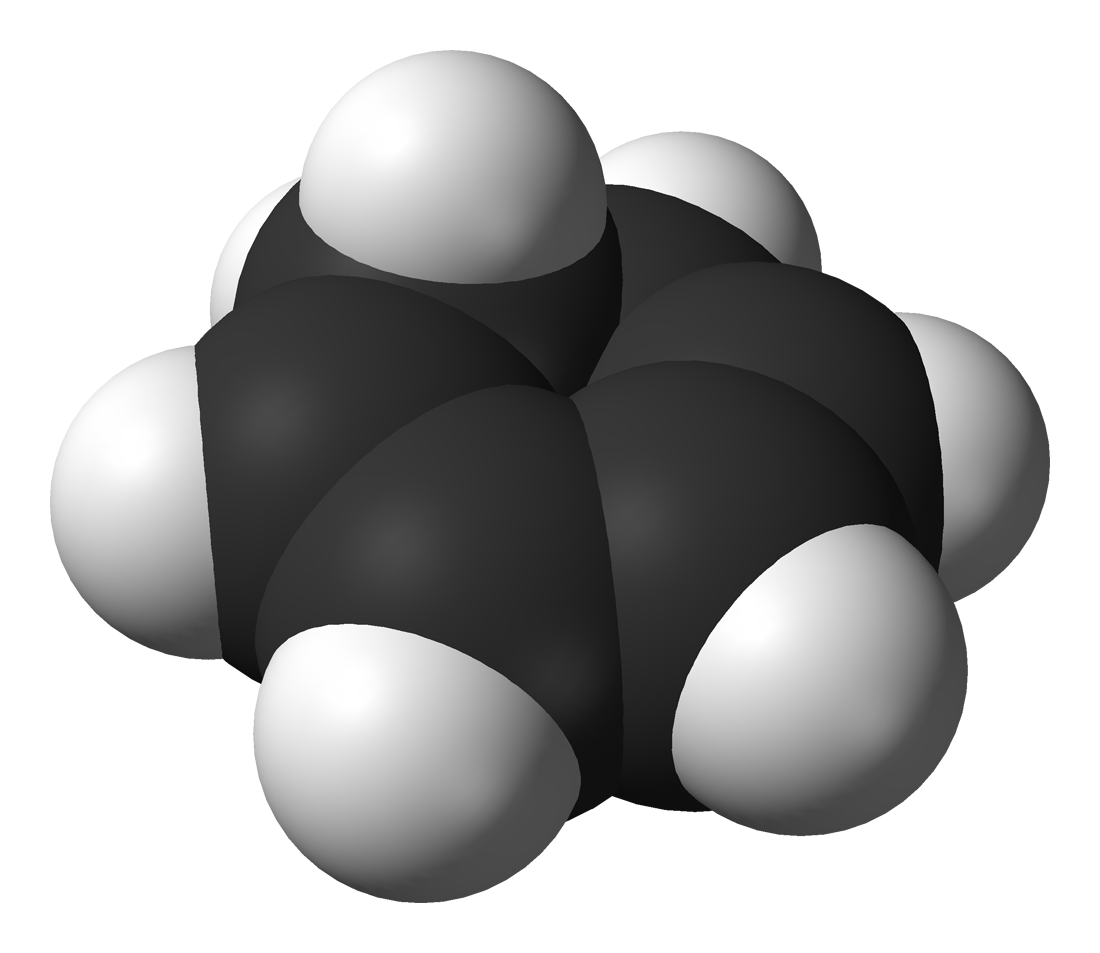

Names
- Preferred IUPAC name Cyclohexa-1,3-diene
- Other names 1,3-Cyclohexadiene, 1,2-Dihydrobenzene, 1,3-CHD, Benzane

Identifiers
CAS Number	592-57-4
3D model (JSmol)	Interactive image
Beilstein Reference	506024
ChEBI	CHEBI:37610
ChemSpider	11117
ECHA InfoCard	100.008.878
EC Number	209-764-1
Gmelin Reference	1657
PubChem CID	11605
RTECS number	GU4702350
UNII	JV5W0EG5BP
UN number	1993
CompTox Dashboard (EPA)	DTXSID30862259
- InChI: InChI=1S/C6H8/c1-2-4-6-5-3-1/h1-4H,5-6H2 Key: MGNZXYYWBUKAII-UHFFFAOYSA-N; InChI=1/C6H8/c1-2-4-6-5-3-1/h1-4H,5-6H2 Key: MGNZXYYWBUKAII-UHFFFAOYAH
- SMILES: C\1=C\C=C/CC/1

Properties
Chemical formula	C_{6}H_{8}
Molar mass	80.130 g·mol^{−1}
Appearance	Colorless liquid
Density	0.841 g/cm^{3}
Melting point	−98 °C (−144 °F; 175 K)
Boiling point	80 °C (176 °F; 353 K)
Magnetic susceptibility (χ)	−48.6·10^{−6} cm^{3}/mol

Hazards
- GHS labelling
Pictograms	(GHS02: Flammable) (GHS07: Exclamation mark)
Signal word	Danger
Hazard statements	H225, H335
Precautionary statements	P210, P233, P240, P241, P242, P243, P261, P271, P280, P303+P361+P353, P304+P340, P312, P370+P378, P403+P233, P403+P235, P405, P501
Flash point	26 °C (79 °F; 299 K) c.c.
- Except where otherwise noted, data are given for materials in their standard state (at 25 °C [77 °F], 100 kPa). verify (what is ?) Infobox references

Cyclohexa-1,3-diene is an organic compound with the formula (C_{2}H_{4})(CH)_{4}. It is a colorless, flammable liquid. Its refractive index is 1.475 (20 °C, D). It is one of two isomers of cyclohexadiene, the other being 1,4-cyclohexadiene. It is commonly referred to as "benzane" due to the structural similarities to benzene and benzyne.

== Synthesis ==
Cyclohexadiene is prepared by the double dehydrobromination of 1,2-dibromocyclohexane:

(CH_{2})_{4}(CHBr)_{2} + 2 NaH → (CH_{2})_{2}(CH)_{4} + 2 NaBr + 2 H_{2}

== Reactions ==
Useful reactions of this diene are cycloadditions, such as the Diels-Alder reaction.

Conversion of cyclohexa-1,3-diene to benzene + hydrogen is exothermic by about 25 kJ/mol in the gas phase.

cyclohexane → cyclohexa-1,3-diene + 2 H_{2} (ΔH = +231.5 kJ/mol; endothermic)
cyclohexane → benzene + 3 H_{2} (ΔH = +205 kJ/mol; endothermic)
cyclohexa-1,3-diene → benzene + H_{2} (ΔH = -26.5 kJ/mol; exothermic)

Compared with its isomer cyclohexa-1,4-diene, cyclohexa-1,3-diene is about 1.6 kJ/mol more stable.

Cyclohexadiene and its derivatives form (diene)iron tricarbonyl complexes. Illustrative is [(C_{6}H_{8})Fe(CO)_{3}], an orange liquid. This complex reacts with hydride-abstracting reagents to give the cyclohexadienyl derivative [(C_{6}H_{7})Fe(CO)_{3}]^{+}. Cyclohexadienes react with ruthenium trichloride to give (Benzene)ruthenium dichloride dimer.

== Occurrence ==
Cyclohexa-1,3-diene itself is rare in nature, but the cyclohexa-1,3-diene motif is fairly common. One example is chorismic acid, an intermediate in the shikimic acid pathway. Of the several examples of the terpenoids and terpenes, a prominent example is phellandrene. An unusual derivative is cis-1,2-dihydrocatechol.

Coenzyme A-conjugated to the 2-position of cyclohexadiene-2-carboxylic acid is an intermediate in the biodegradation of aromatic carboxylic acids.

== See also ==
- 1,4-Cyclohexadiene
- Cyclohexene
