= Pentadiene =

Hydrocarbon compound made of a 5-carbon chain with two single and two double bonds

1,2-Pentadiene

1,3-Pentadiene

1,4-Pentadiene

(R)-2,3-Pentadiene

In organic chemistry, pentadiene is any hydrocarbon with an open chain of five carbons, connected by two single bonds and two double bonds. All those compounds have the same molecular formula C_{5}H_{8}. The inventory of pentadienes include:

- 1,2-pentadiene, or ethyl allene, H_{2}C=C=CH−CH_{2}−CH_{3}. It and 2,3-pentadiene are the least common isomers of pentadiene.
- 1,3-pentadiene, H_{2}C=CH−CH=CH−CH_{3} with two isomers:
  - cis-1,3-pentadiene.
  - trans-1,3-pentadiene, also known as piperylene.
- 1,4-pentadiene, H_{2}C=CH−CH_{2}−CH=CH_{2}.
- 2,3-pentadiene, H_{3}C−CH=C=CH−CH_{3}, with two enantiomers (R and S). It and 1,2-pentadiene are the least common isomers of pentadiene.

Well known derivatives containing pentadiene groups include hexadienes, cyclopentadiene, and especially three fatty acids linoleic acid, α-linolenic acid, and arachidonic acid as well as their triglyceride esters (fats).

== Preparation and basic reactions ==
1,4-Pentadiene can be prepared from 1,5-pentanediol via the diacetate.

1,3-Pentadiene, like 1,3-butadiene, undergoes a variety of cycloaddition reactions. For example, it forms a sulfolene upon treatment with sulfur dioxide.

== Biochemistry ==
Methylene-interrupted polyenes are 1,4-pentadiene groups found in polyunsaturated fatty acids linoleic acid, α-linolenic acid, and arachidonic acid. These pentadiene derivatives are susceptible to lipid peroxidation, far moreso than monounsaturated or saturated fatty acids. The basis for this reactivity is the weakness of doubly allylic C-H bonds, leading to pentadienyl radicals. A range of reactions with oxygen occur. Products include fatty acid hydroperoxides, epoxy-hydroxy polyunsaturated fatty acids, jasmonates, divinylether fatty acids, and leaf aldehydes. Some of these derivatives are signalling molecules, some are used in plant defense (antifeedants), some are precursors to other metabolites that are used by the plant.

Cyclooxygenases ("COX") are enzymes that generate prostanoids, including thromboxane and prostaglandins such as prostacyclin. Aspirin and ibuprofen exert their effects through inhibition of COX.

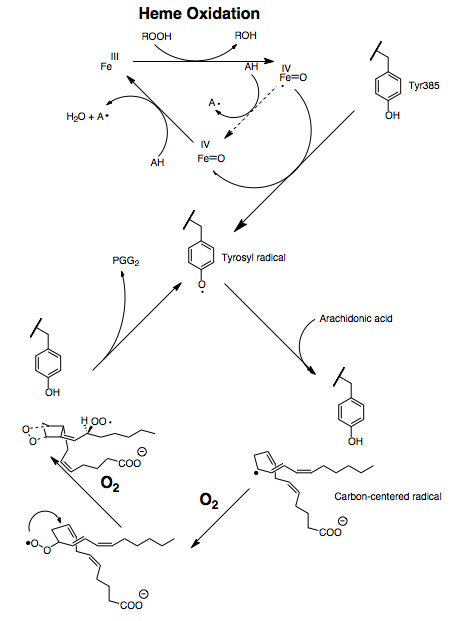
Mechanism of COX activation and catalysis. The tyrosyl radical can abstracts the 13-pro(S) hydrogen of arachidonic acid to generate a pentadienyl radical, initiating the COX cycle.

== Drying and rancidification ==
Simplified chemical reactions associated with the formation of a hydroperoxide from a typical polyunsaturated fatty acid. In the second step, the hydroperoxide combines with another unsaturated side chain to generate a crosslink.

Fats containing 1,4-pentadiene groups are drying oils, i.e. film-forming liquids suitable as paints. One practical consequence is that polyunsaturated fatty acids have poor shelf life owing to their tendency toward autoxidation, leading, in the case of edibles, to rancidification. Metals accelerate the degradation.
