= Cyclohexadiene =

Cyclohexadiene may refer to:

- Cyclohexa-1,3-diene,
- Cyclohexa-1,4-diene,

== See also ==
- Benzene or its theoretical isomer 1,3,5-Cyclohexatriene
- Cyclohexene
