= Cyclobutadieneiron tricarbonyl =

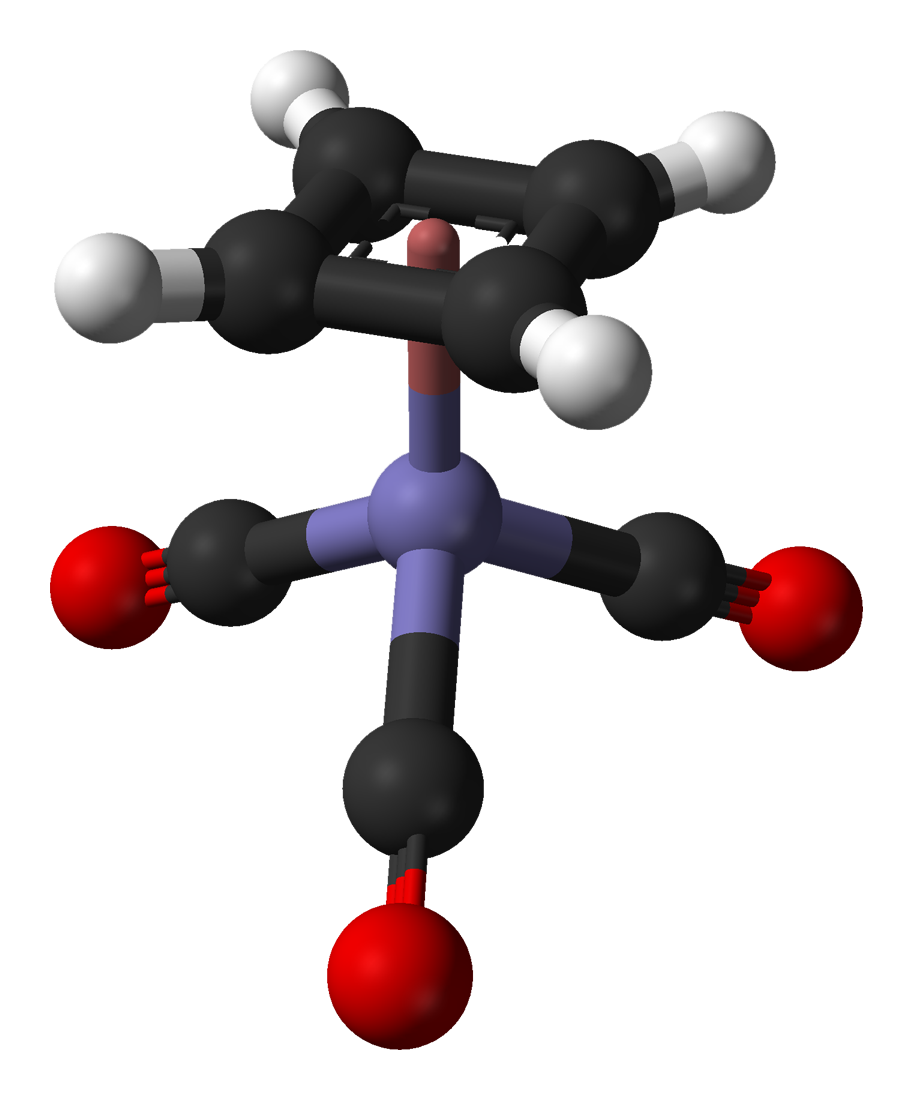

Names
- IUPAC name Tricarbonyl(η^{4}-cyclobutadiene)iron

Identifiers
CAS Number	12078-17-0
3D model (JSmol)	Interactive image
ChemSpider	9096597
- InChI: InChI=1S/C4H4.3CO.Fe/c1-2-4-3-1;3*1-2;/h1-4H;;;; Key: PHCIVYPTULNGTJ-UHFFFAOYSA-N
- SMILES: c1ccc1.[Fe]([C]#[O])([C]#[O])[C]#[O]

Properties
Chemical formula	C_{7}H_{4}FeO_{3}
Molar mass	191.951 g·mol^{−1}
Appearance	pale yellow oil
Boiling point	47 °C (117 °F; 320 K) 3 mm
- Except where otherwise noted, data are given for materials in their standard state (at 25 °C [77 °F], 100 kPa). verify (what is ?) Infobox references

Cyclobutadieneiron tricarbonyl is an organoiron compound with the formula Fe(C_{4}H_{4})(CO)_{3}. It is a yellow oil that is soluble in organic solvents. It has been used in organic chemistry as a precursor for cyclobutadiene, which is an elusive species in the free state.

== Preparation and structure ==
Cyclobutadieneiron tricarbonyl was first prepared in 1965 by Pettit from 3,4-dichlorocyclobutene and diiron nonacarbonyl:

C_{4}H_{4}Cl_{2} + 2 Fe_{2}(CO)_{9} → (C_{4}H_{4})Fe(CO)_{3} + 2 Fe(CO)_{5} + 5 CO + FeCl_{2}

The compound is an example of a piano stool complex. The C-C distances are 1.426 Å.

== Properties ==
Oxidative decomplexation of cyclobutadiene is achieved by treating the tricarbonyl complex with ceric ammonium nitrate. The released cyclobutadiene is trapped with a quinone, which functions as a dienophile.

Cyclobutadieneiron tricarbonyl displays aromaticity as evidenced by some of its reactions, which can be classified as electrophilic aromatic substitution:

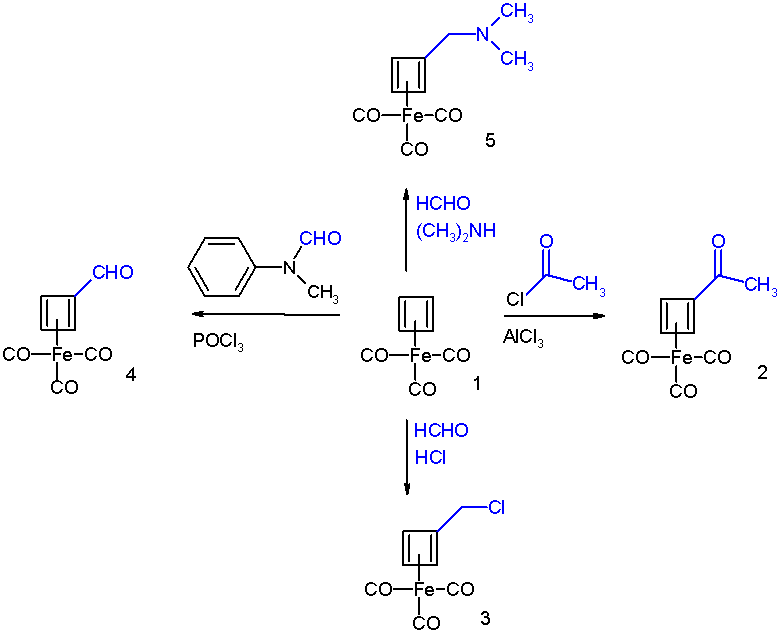

It undergoes Friedel-Crafts acylation with acetyl chloride and aluminium chloride to give the acyl derivative 2, with formaldehyde and hydrochloric acid to the chloromethyl derivative 3, in a Vilsmeier-Haack reaction with N-methylformanilide and phosphorus oxychloride to the formyl 4, and in a Mannich reaction to amine derivative 5.

The reaction mechanism is identical to that of EAS:

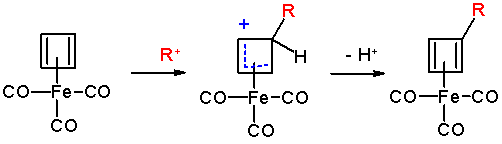

== Related compounds ==
Several years before Petit's work, (C_{4}Ph_{4})Fe(CO)_{3} had been prepared from the reaction of iron carbonyl and diphenylacetylene.

(Butadiene)iron tricarbonyl is isoelectronic with cyclobutadieneiron tricarbonyl.

== History ==
In 1956, Longuet-Higgins and Orgel predicted the existence of transition-metal cyclobutadiene complexes, in which the degenerate e_{g} orbital of cyclobutadiene has the correct symmetry for π interaction with the d_{xz} and d_{yz} orbitals of the proper metal. The compound was synthesized three years after the prediction This is a case of theory before experiment.
