= (Butadiene)iron tricarbonyl =

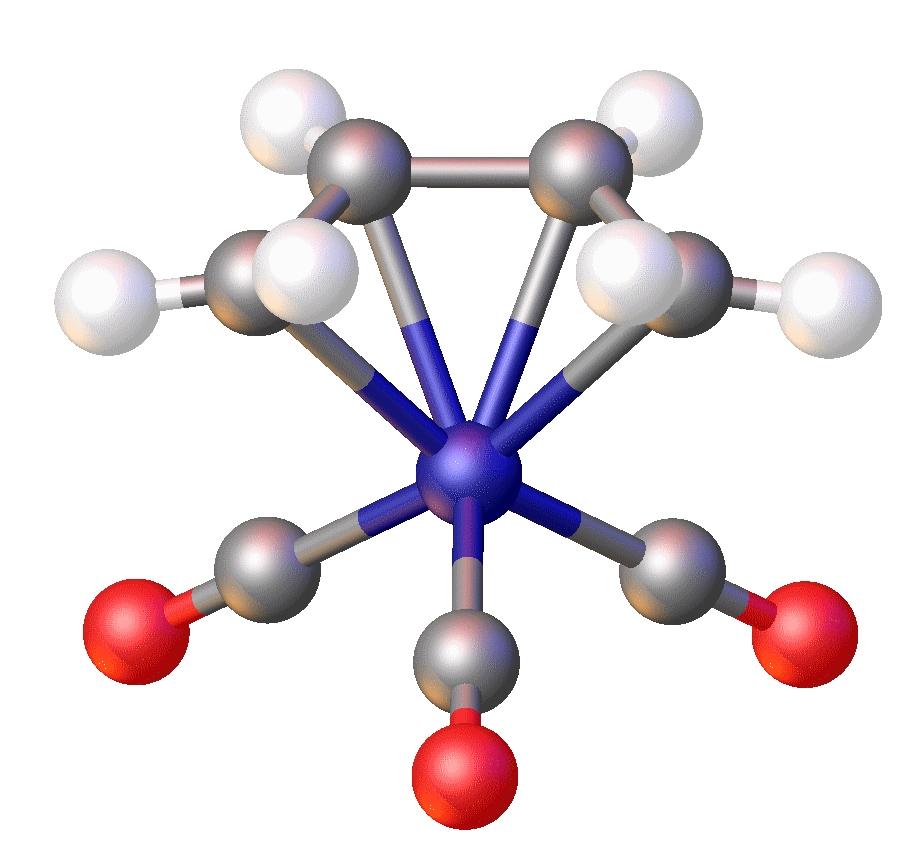

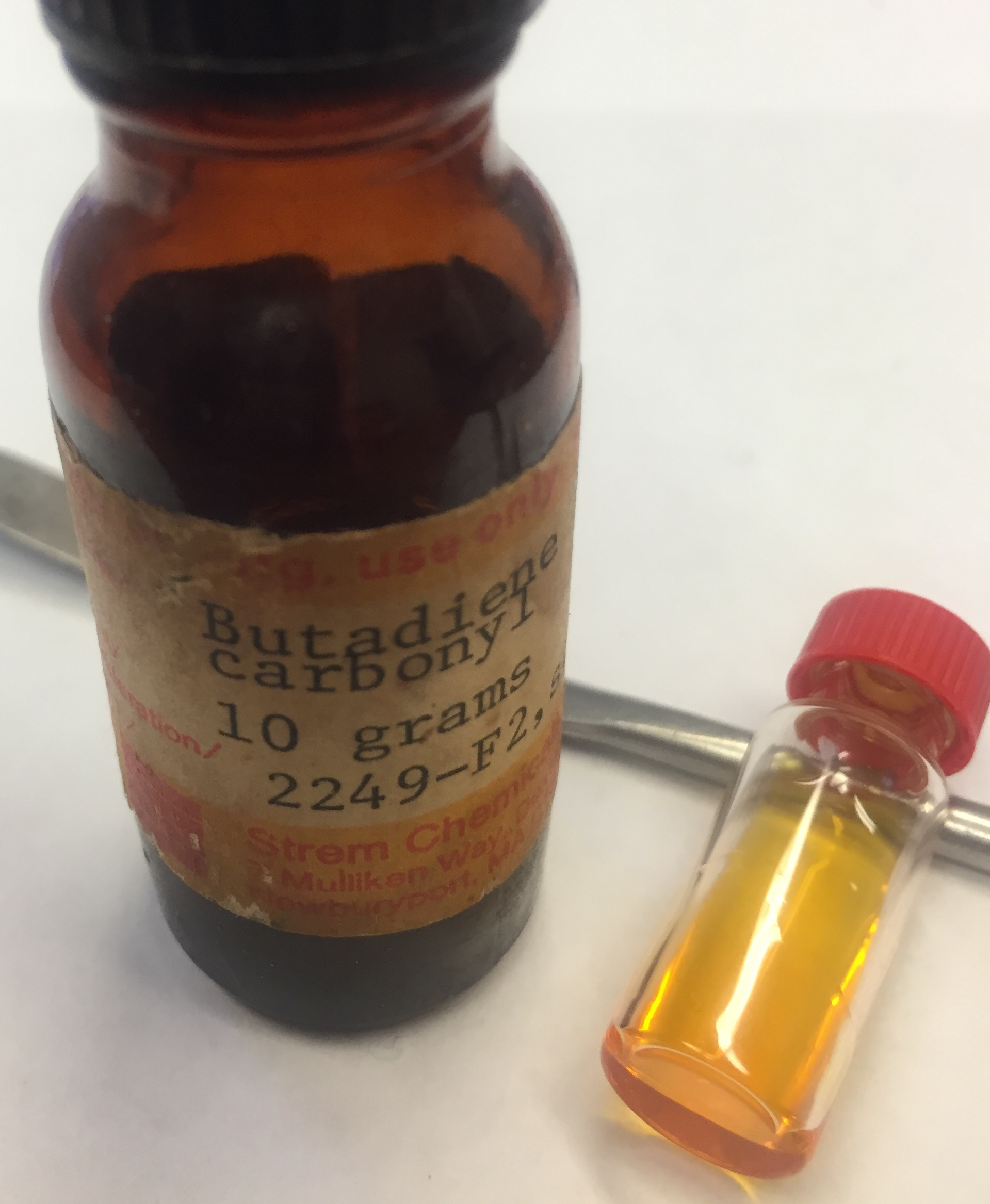

Identifiers
CAS Number	12078-32-9
3D model (JSmol)	Interactive image
ChemSpider	9140589
EC Number	235-140-3
PubChem CID	11965858; 25509
- InChI: InChI=1S/C4H6.3CO.Fe/c1-3-4-2;3*1-2;/h3-4H,1-2H2;;;; Key: NBFCJULAAWWTBL-UHFFFAOYSA-N
- SMILES: C=CC=C.[C-]#[O+].[C-]#[O+].[C-]#[O+].[Fe]

Properties
Chemical formula	C_{7}H_{6}FeO_{3}
Molar mass	193.967 g·mol^{−1}
Appearance	yellow oil
Melting point	19 °C (66 °F; 292 K)
- Except where otherwise noted, data are given for materials in their standard state (at 25 °C [77 °F], 100 kPa). Infobox references

(Butadiene)iron tricarbonyl is an organoiron compound with the formula (C_{4}H_{6})Fe(CO)_{3}. This coordination complex is a well-studied simple example of a (diene)iron tricarbonyl complex. An orange-colored viscous liquid that freezes just below room temperature, the compound adopts a piano stool structure.

== Synthesis and reactivity ==
The complex was first prepared by heating iron pentacarbonyl with the diene.

Protonation of the title complex with hydrogen chloride gives (allyl)Fe(CO)_{3}Cl.

== Related compounds ==
Iron(0) complexes of conjugated dienes have been extensively studied. In the butadiene series, (η^{2}-C_{4}H_{6})Fe(CO)_{4} and (η^{2}:η^{2}-C_{4}H_{6})(Fe(CO)_{4})_{2} have been crystallized. Many related complexes are known for substituted butadienes and related species. The species (η^{4}-isoprene)iron tricarbonyl is chiral.

== See also ==
- Cyclobutadieneiron tricarbonyl
