= List of UN numbers 3301 to 3400 =

UN numbers from UN3301 to UN3400 as assigned by the United Nations Committee of Experts on the Transport of Dangerous Goods are as follows:

== UN 3301 to UN 3400 ==
UN Number	Class	Proper Shipping Name
UN 3301	8	Corrosive liquid, self-heating, n.o.s.
UN 3302	6.1	2-Dimethylaminoethyl acrylate
UN 3303	2.3	Compressed gas, toxic, oxidising, n.o.s.
UN 3304	2.3	Compressed gas, toxic, corrosive, n.o.s.
UN 3305	2.3	Compressed gas, toxic, flammable, corrosive, n.o.s.
UN 3306	2.3	Compressed gas, toxic, oxidising, corrosive, n.o.s.
UN 3307	2.3	Liquefied gas, toxic, oxidising, n.o.s.
UN 3308	2.3	Liquefied gas, toxic, corrosive, n.o.s.
UN 3309	2.3	Liquefied gas, toxic, flammable, corrosive, n.o.s.
UN 3310	2.3	Liquefied gas, toxic, oxidising, corrosive, n.o.s.
UN 3311	2.2	Gas, refrigerated liquid, oxidising, n.o.s.
UN 3312	2.1	Gas, refrigerated liquid, flammable, n.o.s.
UN 3313	4.2	Organic pigments, self-heating
UN 3314	9	Plastics moulding compound in dough, sheet or extruded rope form evolving flammable vapour
UN 3315	6.1	Chemical sample, toxic
UN 3316	9	Chemical kit or First Aid kit containing dangerous goods
UN 3317	4.1	2-Amino-4,6-dinitrophenol, wetted, with not less than 20% water by mass
UN 3318	2.3	Ammonia solution, relative density less than 0.880 at 15 °C in water, with more than 50% ammonia
UN 3319	4.1	Nitroglycerin mixture, desensitized, solid, n.o.s., with more than 2% but not more than 10% nitroglycerin, by mass
UN 3320	8	Sodium borohydride and sodium hydroxide solution, with not more than 12% sodium borohydride and not more than 20% sodium hydroxide, by mass
UN 3321	7	Radioactive material, low specific activity (LSA-II), non-fissile or fissile excepted
UN 3322	7	Radioactive material, low specific activity (LSA-III), non-fissile or fissile excepted
UN 3323	7	Radioactive material, Type C package, non-fissile or fissile excepted
UN 3324	7	Radioactive material, low specific activity (LSA-II), fissile
UN 3325	7	Radioactive material, low specific activity (LSA-III), fissile
UN 3326	7	Radioactive material, surface contaminated objects (SCO-I or SCO-II), fissile
UN 3327	7	Radioactive material, Type A package, fissile, non-special form
UN 3328	7	Radioactive material, Type B (U) package, fissile
UN 3329	7	Radioactive material, Type B (M) package, fissile
UN 3330	7	Radioactive material, Type C package, fissile
UN 3331	7	Radioactive material, transported under special arrangements, fissile
UN 3332	7	Radioactive material, Type A package, special form, non-fissile or fissile excepted
UN 3333	7	Radioactive material, Type A package, special form, fissile
UN 3334	9	Aviation regulated liquid, n.o.s.
UN 3335	9	Aviation regulated solid, n.o.s.
UN 3336	3	Mercaptans, liquid, flammable, n.o.s. or Mercaptan mixture, liquid, flammable, n.o.s.
UN 3337	2.2	Refrigerant gas R404A
UN 3338	2.2	Refrigerant gas R407A
UN 3339	2.2	Refrigerant gas R407B
UN 3340	2.2	Refrigerant gas R407C
UN 3341	4.2	Thiourea dioxide
UN 3342	4.2	Xanthates
UN 3343	3	Nitroglycerin mixture, desensitized, liquid, flammable, n.o.s., with not more than 30% nitroglycerin by mass
UN 3344	4.1	Pentaerythritol tetranitrate mixture, desensitized, solid, n.o.s., with more than 10% but not more than 20% PETN by mass
UN 3345	6.1	Phenoxyacetic acid derivative pesticide, solid, toxic
UN 3346	3	Phenoxyacetic acid derivative pesticide, liquid, flammable, toxic flash point less than 23 °C
UN 3347	6.1	Phenoxyacetic acid derivative pesticide, liquid, toxic, flammable flash point 23 °C or more
UN 3348	6.1	Phenoxyacetic acid derivative pesticide, liquid, toxic
UN 3349	6.1	Pyrethroid pesticide, solid, toxic
UN 3350	3	Pyrethroid pesticide, liquid, flammable, toxic flash point less than 23 °C
UN 3351	6.1	Pyrethroid pesticide, liquid, toxic, flammable flash point 23 °C or more
UN 3352	6.1	Pyrethroid pesticide, liquid, toxic
UN 3353	9	(UN No. no longer in use) Air bag inflators or Air bag modules or Seat belt pretensioners, compressed gas (UN No. no longer in use)
UN 3354	2.1	Insecticide gas, flammable, n.o.s.
UN 3355	2.3	Insecticide gas, toxic, flammable, n.o.s.
UN 3356	5.1	Oxygen generator, chemical
UN 3357	3	Nitroglycerin mixture, desensitized, liquid, n.o.s., with not more than 30% nitroglycerin by mass
UN 3358	2.1	Refrigerating machines, containing flammable, non-toxic, liquefied gas
UN 3359	9	Fumigated unit
UN 3360	4.1	Fibres, vegetable, dry
UN 3361	6.1	Chlorosilanes, toxic, corrosive, n.o.s.
UN 3362	6.1	Chlorosilanes, toxic, corrosive, flammable, n.o.s.
UN 3363	9	Dangerous goods in machinery or Dangerous goods in apparatus
UN 3364	4.1	Trinitrophenol (Picric acid), wetted, with not less than 10% water by mass
UN 3365	4.1	Trinitrochlorobenzene (Picryl chloride), wetted, with not less than 10% water by mass
UN 3366	4.1	Trinitrotoluene (TNT), wetted, with not less than 10% water by mass
UN 3367	4.1	Trinitrobenzene, wetted, with not less than 10% water by mass
UN 3368	4.1	Trinitrobenzoic acid, wetted, with not less than 10% water by mass
UN 3369	4.1	Sodium dinitro-o-cresolate, wetted, with not less than 10% water by mass
UN 3370	4.1	Urea nitrate, wetted, with not less than 10% water by mass
UN 3371	3	2-Methylbutanal
UN 3372	(4.3)	(UN No. no longer in use) Organometallic compound, solid, water reactive, flammable, n.o.s (UN No. no longer in use)
UN 3373	6.2	Biological substance, Category B
UN 3374	2.1	Acetylene, solvent free
UN 3375	5.1	Ammonium nitrate emulsion or suspension or gel
UN 3376	4.1	4-Nitrophenylhydrazine, with not less than 30% water by mass
UN 3377	5.1	Sodium perborate monohydrate
UN 3378	5.1	Sodium carbonate peroxyhydrate
UN 3379	3	Desensitized explosive, liquid, n.o.s.
UN 3380	4.1	Desensitized explosive, solid, n.o.s.
UN 3381	6.1	Toxic by inhalation liquid, n.o.s. with an inhalation toxicity lower than or equal to 200ml/m^{3} and saturated vapour concentration greater than or equal to 500 LC_{50}
UN 3382	6.1	Toxic by inhalation liquid, n.o.s. with an inhalation toxicity lower than or equal to 1000ml/m^{3} and saturated vapour concentration greater than or equal to 10 LC_{50}
UN 3383	6.1	Toxic by inhalation liquid, flammable, n.o.s. with an inhalation toxicity lower than or equal to 200ml/m^{3} and saturated vapour concentration greater than or equal to 500 LC_{50}
UN 3384	6.1	Toxic by inhalation liquid, flammable, n.o.s. with an inhalation toxicity lower than or equal to 1000ml/m^{3} and saturated vapour concentration greater than or equal to 10 LC_{50}
UN 3385	6.1	Toxic by inhalation liquid, water-reactive, n.o.s. with an inhalation toxicity lower than or equal to 200ml/m^{3} and saturated vapour concentration greater than or equal to 500 LC_{50}
UN 3386	6.1	Toxic by inhalation liquid, water-reactive, n.o.s. with an inhalation toxicity lower than or equal to 1000ml/m^{3} and saturated vapour concentration greater than or equal to 10 LC_{50}
UN 3387	6.1	Toxic by inhalation liquid, oxidising, n.o.s. with an inhalation toxicity lower than or equal to 200ml/m^{3} and saturated vapour concentration greater than or equal to 500 LC_{50}
UN 3388	6.1	Toxic by inhalation liquid, oxidising, n.o.s. with an inhalation toxicity lower than or equal to 1000ml/m^{3} and saturated vapour concentration greater than or equal to 10 LC_{50}
UN 3389	6.1	Toxic by inhalation liquid, corrosive, n.o.s. with an inhalation toxicity lower than or equal to 200ml/m^{3} and saturated vapour concentration greater than or equal to 500 LC_{50}
UN 3390	6.1	Toxic by inhalation liquid, corrosive, n.o.s. with an inhalation toxicity lower than or equal to 1000ml/m^{3} and saturated vapour concentration greater than or equal to 10 LC_{50}
UN 3391	4.2	Organometallic substance, solid, pyrophoric
UN 3392	4.2	Organometallic substance, liquid, pyrophoric
UN 3393	4.2	Organometallic substance, solid, pyrophoric, water-reactive
UN 3394	4.2	Organometallic substance, liquid, pyrophoric, water-reactive
UN 3395	4.3	Organometallic substance, solid, water-reactive
UN 3396	4.3	Organometallic substance, solid, water-reactive, flammable
UN 3397	4.3	Organometallic substance, solid, water-reactive, self-heating
UN 3398	4.3	Organometallic substance, liquid, water-reactive
UN 3399	4.3	Organometallic substance, liquid, water-reactive, flammable
UN 3400	4.3	Organometallic substance, liquid, water-reactive, self-heating

== See also ==
- Lists of UN numbers
