= Fluazifop =

ACCase herbicide, fop, anti-grass

- Fluazifop-P (R isomer)

Names
- IUPAC name (2R)-2-(4-([5-(trifluoromethyl)-2-pyridyl]oxy)phenoxy)propanoic acid
- Preferred IUPAC name (2R)-2-(4-([5-(trifluoromethyl)pyridin-2-yl]oxy)phenoxy)propanoic acid
- Other names PP005, SL118

Identifiers
- Compounds; (RS): Fluazifop; (R): Fluazifop-P; (R) butyl ester: Fluazifop-P butyl ester
CAS Number	(RS): 69335-91-7; (R): 83066-88-0; (R) butyl ester: 79241-46-6
3D model (JSmol)	(R): Interactive image
ChEBI	(RS): CHEBI:83598; (R) butyl ester: CHEBI:132964
ChEMBL	(RS): ChEMBL376218
ChemSpider	(RS): 82803; (R): 82832; (R) butyl ester: 2298297
ECHA InfoCard	100.130.325
EC Number	(RS): 614-949-9; (R) butyl ester: 616-669-2
PubChem CID	(RS): 91701; (R): 91733; (R) butyl ester: 3033674
UNII	(RS): 8JD49YW45K
CompTox Dashboard (EPA)	(RS): DTXSID3058163
- InChI: (RS): InChI=1S/C15H12F3NO4/c1-9(14(20)21)22-11-3-5-12(6-4-11)23-13-7-2-10(8-19-13)15(16,17)18/h2-9H,1H3,(H,20,21) Key: YUVKUEAFAVKILW-UHFFFAOYSA-N; (R): InChI=1S/C15H12F3NO4/c1-9(14(20)21)22-11-3-5-12(6-4-11)23-13-7-2-10(8-19-13)15(16,17)18/h2-9H,1H3,(H,20,21)/t9-/m1/s1 Key: YUVKUEAFAVKILW-SECBINFHSA-N; (R) butyl ester: Key: VAIZTNZGPYBOGF-CYBMUJFWSA-N
- SMILES: (R): C[C@H](C(=O)O)Oc1ccc(cc1)Oc2ccc(cn2)C(F)(F)F

Properties
Chemical formula	C_{15}H_{12}F_{3}NO_{4}
Molar mass	327.259 g·mol^{−1}
Solubility in water	40.5 mg/L (20 °C)
log P	3.18
Acidity (pK_{a})	3.12

Hazards
- GHS labelling
Pictograms	(GHS08: Health hazard) (GHS09: Environmental hazard)
Signal word	Warning
Hazard statements	H361, H410
Precautionary statements	P201, P202, P273, P281, P308+P313, P391, P405, P501
Flash point	225 °C (437 °F; 498 K)
- Except where otherwise noted, data are given for materials in their standard state (at 25 °C [77 °F], 100 kPa). Infobox references

Fluazifop is the common name used by the ISO for an organic compound that is used as a selective herbicide. The active ingredient is the 2R enantiomer at its chiral centre and this material is known as fluazifop-P when used in that form. More commonly, it is sold as its butyl ester, fluazifop-P butyl with the brand name Fusilade.

== History ==
In the 1970s, a number of agrochemical companies were working to develop new herbicides to be complementary to the auxin phenoxyacetic acid types such as 2,4-D, which had activity on broad-leaved weeds but were safe to grass crops such as the cereals. Thus the aim was to find materials which would selectively control grass weeds in broad-leaved crops such as cotton and soybean.

Diclofop: X = CH, R^{1} = R^{2} = Cl Chlorazifop: X = N, R^{1} = R^{2} = Cl Fluazifop: X = N, R^{1} = CF_{3}, R^{2} = H Haloxyfop: X = N, R^{1} = CF_{3}, R^{2} = Cl

In 1973, Hoechst AG filed patents on a new class of compound, the aryloxyphenoxypropionates, which showed such selectivity and led to the commercialisation of diclofop. Then the Japanese company Ishihara Sangyo Kaisha (ISK) found improved biological activity in an analogue, chlorazifop, which replaced the aryloxy portion of diclofop with a pyridine ring containing the same two chlorine substituents. This area of research became very competitive and within three weeks of one another in 1977 ISK, Dow Chemicals and Imperial Chemical Industries (ICI) all filed patents covering another group of analogues, with a trifluoromethyl (CF_{3}) group in place of one of the chlorine atoms in the pyridine. Subsequently, ISK and ICI cross-licensed their intellectual property and first marketed fluazifop as its butyl ester in 1981 under the brand name Fusilade while Dow marketed haloxyfop as its methyl ester. All these compounds have an additional oxygen-linked aromatic group in the para position of the phenyl ring with its OCH(CH_{3})COOH group and as a class are called "fops", referring to their common fenoxy-phenoxy [sic] feature. (In other words, fops are a subtype of ACCase herbicides, specifically the aryloxyphenoxypropionates.)

== Synthesis ==

The preparation of fluazifop butyl ester as a racemate was disclosed in patents filed by ICI and ISK. Hydroquinone is combined to form ethers with 2-chloro-5-trifluoromethyl pyridine and the butyl ester of 2-bromopropionic acid: these nucleophilic substitution reactions can be performed in either order. The compound is now sold in its single-enantiomer form by Syngenta and other manufacturers. It is produced from chiral starting materials such as alanine and lactic acid.

== Mechanism of action ==
Fluazifop and other similar herbicides act by inhibiting plant acetyl-CoA carboxylase (ACCase). Their selectivity for grasses arises because they target the plastid isoform of the enzyme present only in these species, making them ineffective on broad-leaved weeds and other organisms including mammals. When applied as an ester, metabolism in the target plant leads to the parent acid which is responsible for the herbicidal action.

== Usage ==
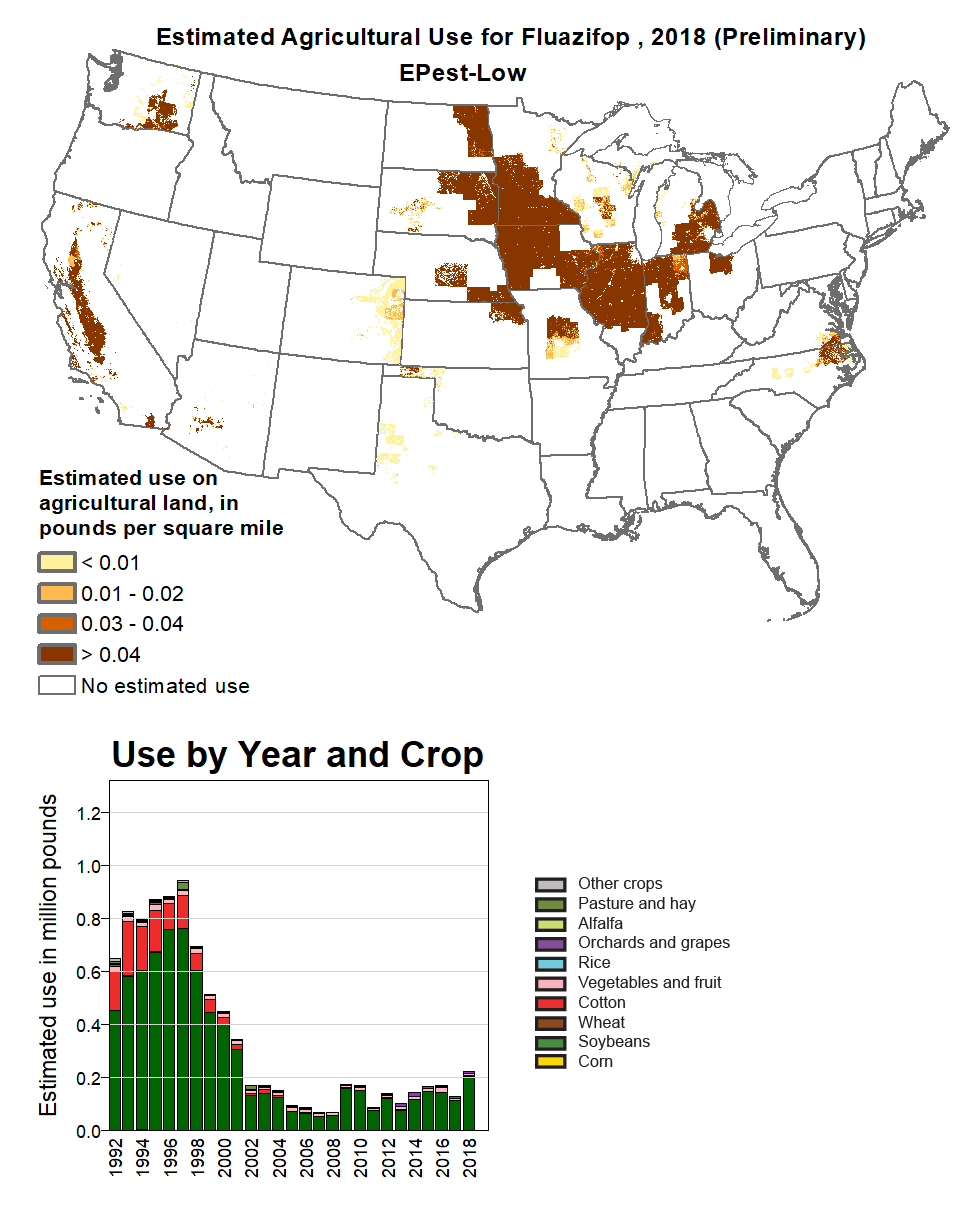
US Geological Survey estimate of fluazifop use in the USA to 2018

The estimated annual use of fluazifop in US agriculture is mapped by the US Geological Service and shows that in 2018, approximately 200,000 pounds (91,000 kg) were applied — almost exclusively in soyabean. The earlier much higher figure is partly because the compound was initially used as its racemate. The herbicide is also registered for use in the European Union under EC Regulation 1107/2009.

== Human safety ==
The LD_{50} of fluazifop-P butyl is 2451 mg/kg (rats, oral), which means that it has low toxicity by oral ingestion. It metabolises in plants and soil to the parent acid, fluazifop-P. The World Health Organization (WHO) and Food and Agriculture Organization (FAO) joint meeting on pesticide residues has determined that the acceptable daily intake for fluazifop is 0-0.004 mg/kg bodyweight. The Codex Alimentarius database maintained by the FAO lists the maximum residue limits for fluazifop in various food products, some of which are set at its 0.01 mg/kg limit of detection while others are much higher, including soyabean at 15 mg/kg.

== Effects on the environment ==
The environmental fate and ecotoxicology of fluazifop-P are summarised in the Pesticide Properties database and a very extensive risk assessment of the compound was made by the USDA Forest Service.

== Resistance Management ==
There are many reports of individual weed species becoming resistant to fluazifop and other ACCase inhibitors. These are monitored by manufacturers, regulatory bodies such as the EPA and the Herbicides Resistance Action Committee (HRAC). In some cases, the risks of resistance developing can be reduced by using a mixture of two or more herbicides which each have activity on relevant weeds but with unrelated mechanisms of action. HRAC assigns active ingredients into classes so as to facilitate this.
