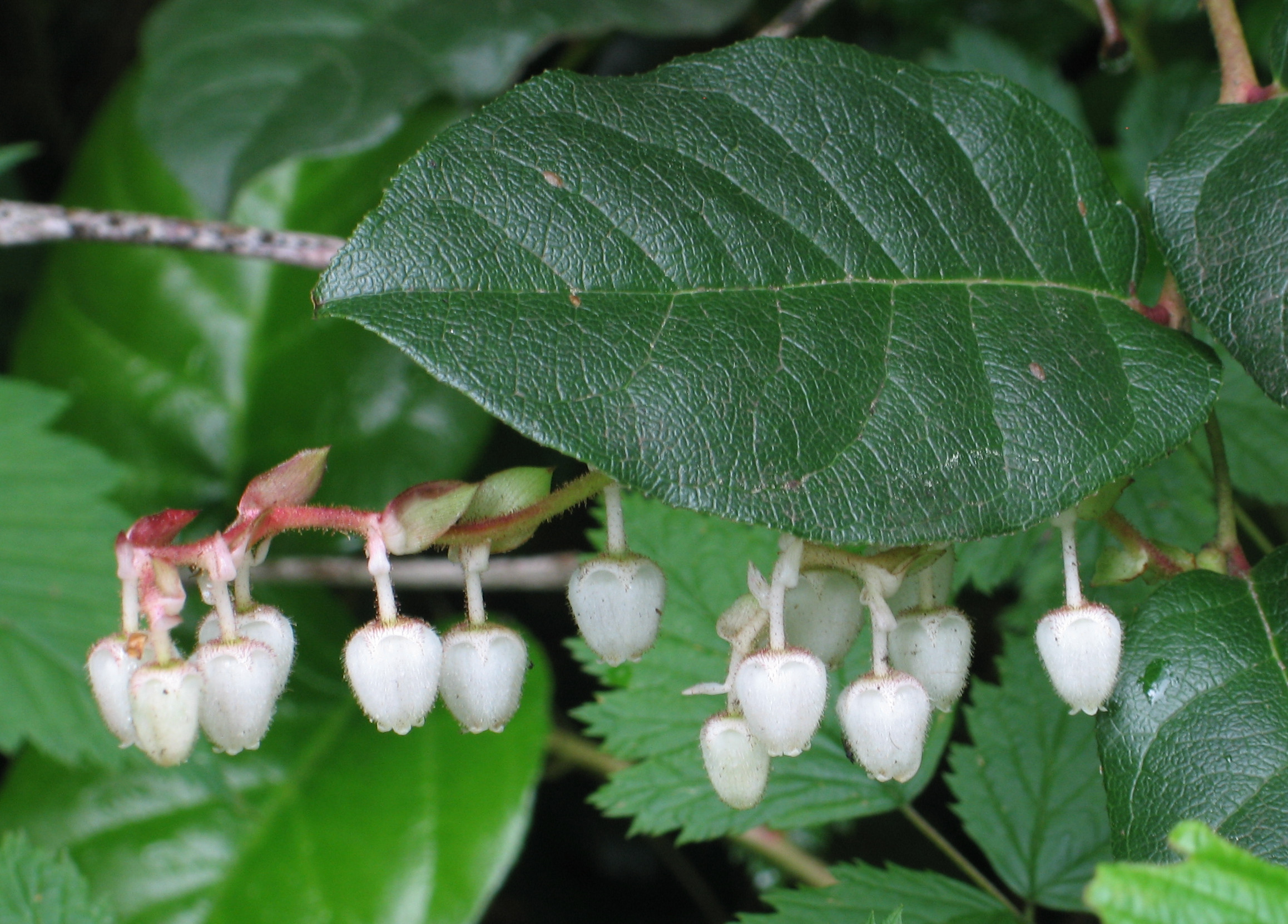
- Leaves and flowers

Conservation status
- Secure (NatureServe)

Scientific classification
- Kingdom: Plantae
- Clade: Tracheophytes
- Clade: Angiosperms
- Clade: Eudicots
- Clade: Asterids
- Order: Ericales
- Family: Ericaceae
- Genus: Gaultheria
- Species: G. shallon

Binomial name
- Gaultheria shallon Pursh

= Gaultheria shallon =

Species of flowering plant

Gaultheria shallon is an evergreen shrub in the heather family (Ericaceae), native to western North America. Common names include salal (/səˈlæl/), shallon, or (mainly in Britain) gaultheria.

== Description ==
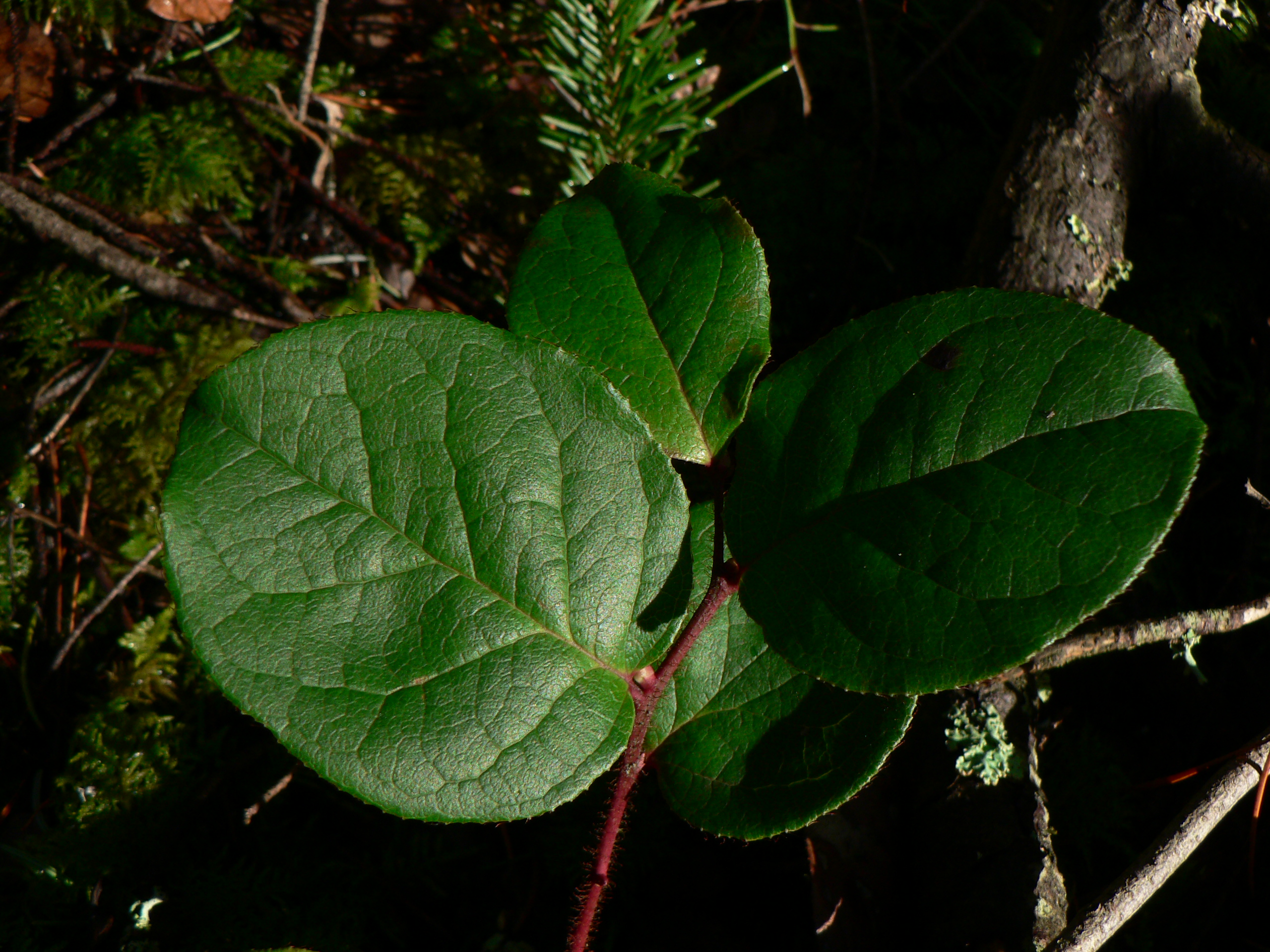
The finely and sharply serrate leaves are shiny and dark green above.

Gaultheria shallon is 0.4 to 3.05 metres (1 1/2 to 10 feet) tall, sprawling to erect. It is loosely to densely branched and often forms dense, nearly impenetrable thickets. The twigs are reddish-brown, with shredding bark. Twigs can live up to 16 years or more, but bear leaves only the first few years.

The leaves are alternate, evergreen, leathery, thick and egg shaped. They are shiny and dark green on the upper surface, and rough and lighter green on the lower. Each finely and sharply serrate leaf is 5 to 10 centimetres (2 to 4 inches) long. Each leaf generally lives for 2 to 4 years before it is replaced.

The inflorescence of flowers consists of a bracteate raceme, one-sided, with 5–15 flowers at the ends of branches. Each flower is composed of a deeply five-parted, glandular-haired calyx and an urn-shaped pink to white, glandular to hairy, five-lobed petals (corolla), 7 to 10 millimetres (1/4 to 3/8 in) long.

The fruit is reddish to blue, rough-surfaced, covered in tiny hairs, nearly spherical and 6 to 10 mm in diameter. The fruits are 'pseudoberries', or capsules made up of a fleshy outer calyx, and each fruit contains an average of 126 brown, reticulate seeds approximately 0.1 mm in length. These berries are also edible.

== Etymology ==
Lewis and Clark reported the local Chinook Jargon name of the omnipresent evergreen shrub to be shallon, shelwel, or shellwell, but when Scottish naturalist David Douglas arrived at Fort George in April 1825 he noted that it was not called shallon but rather salal or sallal.

The genus Gaultheria was named by Pehr Kalm for his guide in Canada, fellow botanist Jean François Gaultier.

In the Squamish language, the fruits are called t’áḵa7 and the bush is called t’áḵa7áy̓. In the Saanich dialect, salal berries are called DAḴE In the Lushootseed language, the month of August is named pədt̕aqaʔ, literally 'time of the salal.'

== Distribution ==
Salal is found in Southeast Alaska, British Columbia, Washington and Oregon and along much of the California coast. It grows as far north as Baranof Island, Alaska. Western poison oak is a common associate in the California Coast Ranges.

=== In Europe ===
The species was introduced to Britain in 1828 by David Douglas, who intended the plant to be used as an ornamental. It is believed to have been planted as cover for pheasants on shooting estates.

== Ecology ==
=== Preferred sites ===
G. shallon grows in moist to dry, montane to lowland coastal conifer forests as well as forested peatland and swamps throughout the Pacific Northwest down to Southern California. It is a common coniferous forest understory species where shade is not heavy and may dominate large areas with its spreading rhizomes. Individual plants may live for hundreds of years, spreading from their rhizomes. The plant is sensitive to frost.

It is tolerant of salt spray and grows well on stabilized dunes, exposed slopes, and bluffs near the ocean, as well as in coastal brushfields and coastal shore pine and Sitka spruce forests. Salal tolerates moderate shade and does well in sun.

It grows in a variety of soils but prefers moist sandy or peaty soils, and commonly establishes on decaying wood and stumps or as an epiphyte in extremely humid areas.

Conifer regeneration is typically better on sites dominated by salal than on sites dominated by the western swordfern or vine maple, although it still competes with conifer seedlings for water, nutrients, and space. There are mixed reports on its impact on Douglas-fir regrowth; on some sites it may hinder it, but on others it may add nutrients to the soil and actually increase conifer regeneration.

=== Use by animals ===
The leaves are browsed by deer and elk, and it is an important winter food for those species. Browsing is heaviest when other low-growing species become covered in snow; in Western Washington salal leaves composed 30.4% of deer diet by volume in January, compared to only 0.5% in June. The leaves have relatively low nutritional value, and deer which feed exclusively on them have shown signs of malnutrition, cementing their status as a winter and emergency food for ungulates. Beavers and the white-footed vole are known to feed on salal leaves, as are domestic goats and sheep in some areas.

The band-tailed pigeon, wrentit, various species of grouse, and numerous songbirds consume the fruit, as do mammals such as the red squirrel, black bear, black-tailed deer, Townsend's chipmunk, and the Douglas squirrel.

Salal flowers are pollinated by hummingbirds, bees, and flies, and are browsed by deer.

It provides important cover and hiding places for a variety of species, from large ungulates to small birds and mammals.

=== Fire ecology ===
Salal is adapted to a fire regime of infrequent fires, from intervals of 50 to 500+ years. Although aboveground portions of the plant may be consumed, rhizomes in the soil will survive and resprout after light to moderate fires. Severe fires on dry, shallow soil will penetrate into the roots and kill the plant.

=== Invasiveness ===
It readily colonizes heathland and acidic woodland habitats in southern England, often forming very tall and dense evergreen stands which smother other vegetation. Although heathland managers widely regard it as a problem weed on unmanaged heathland, it is readily browsed by cattle (especially in winter), so where traditional grazing management has been restored, the dense stands become broken up and the plant becomes a more scattered component of the heathland vegetation.

As an invasive species, salal is resistant to many herbicides because of its waxy foliage, although Garlon and Silvex can be effective when properly applied. Attempts at mechanical removal may break up rhizomes and stimulate new growth, thus increasing salal cover.

== Uses ==
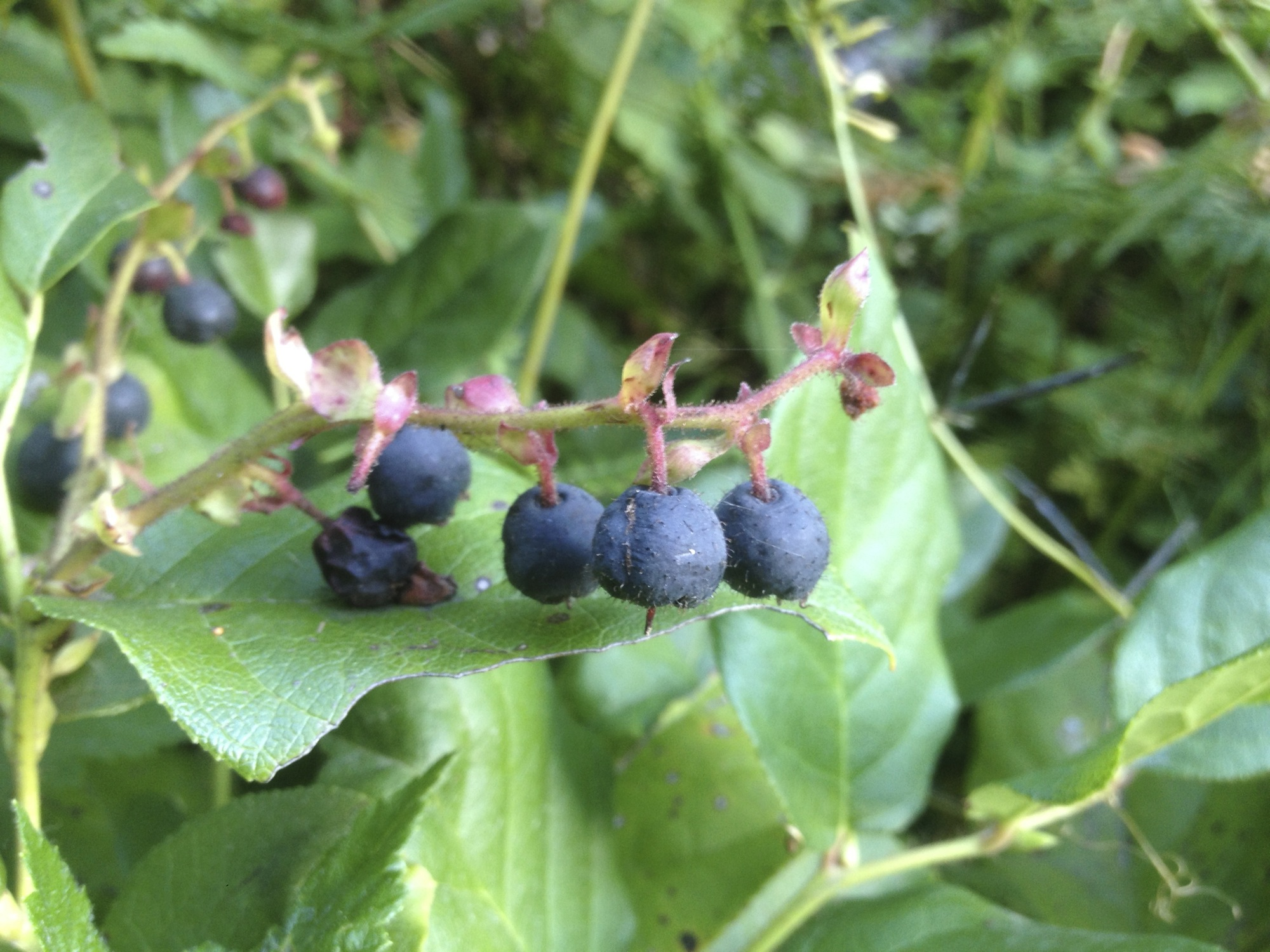
Ripe berries

The dark blue berries and young leaves are edible and efficient appetite suppressants, both with a unique flavor. The berries were a significant food resource for some Native American tribes, who ate them fresh and dried them into cakes. They were also used as a sweetener, and the Haida used them to thicken salmon eggs. The leaves of the plant were also sometimes used to flavor fish soup.

More recently, the berries are used locally in jams, preserves, and pies. They are often combined with Oregon-grape because salal's mild sweetness partially masks the former's tartness.

Salal is widely cultivated as an ornamental both within and outside of its native range, useful for ground cover and landscaping.

In the Pacific Northwest, the harvesting of G. shallon is the heart of a large industry which supplies cut evergreens worldwide for use in floral arrangements. It is used in native plant gardens and sold as "Lemon Leaf".

=== Medicinal properties ===
The species has been used for its medicinal properties by local natives for generations, although its medicinal uses are not widely known. The leaves have an astringent effect, making it an effective anti-inflammatory and anti-cramping herb. Leaves prepared in a tea or tincture are thought to decrease internal inflammation (such as bladder inflammation), stomach or duodenal ulcers, heartburn, indigestion, sinus inflammation, diarrhea, moderate fever, inflamed/irritated throat, and menstrual cramps. A poultice of the leaf can be used externally to ease discomfort from insect bites and stings.
