= C11H16 =

The molecular formula C_{11}H_{16} (molar mass: 148.24 g/mol, exact mass: 148.1252 u) may refer to:

- Ectocarpene
- Pentamethylbenzene
