= Hexamethylbenzene =

Chemical compound

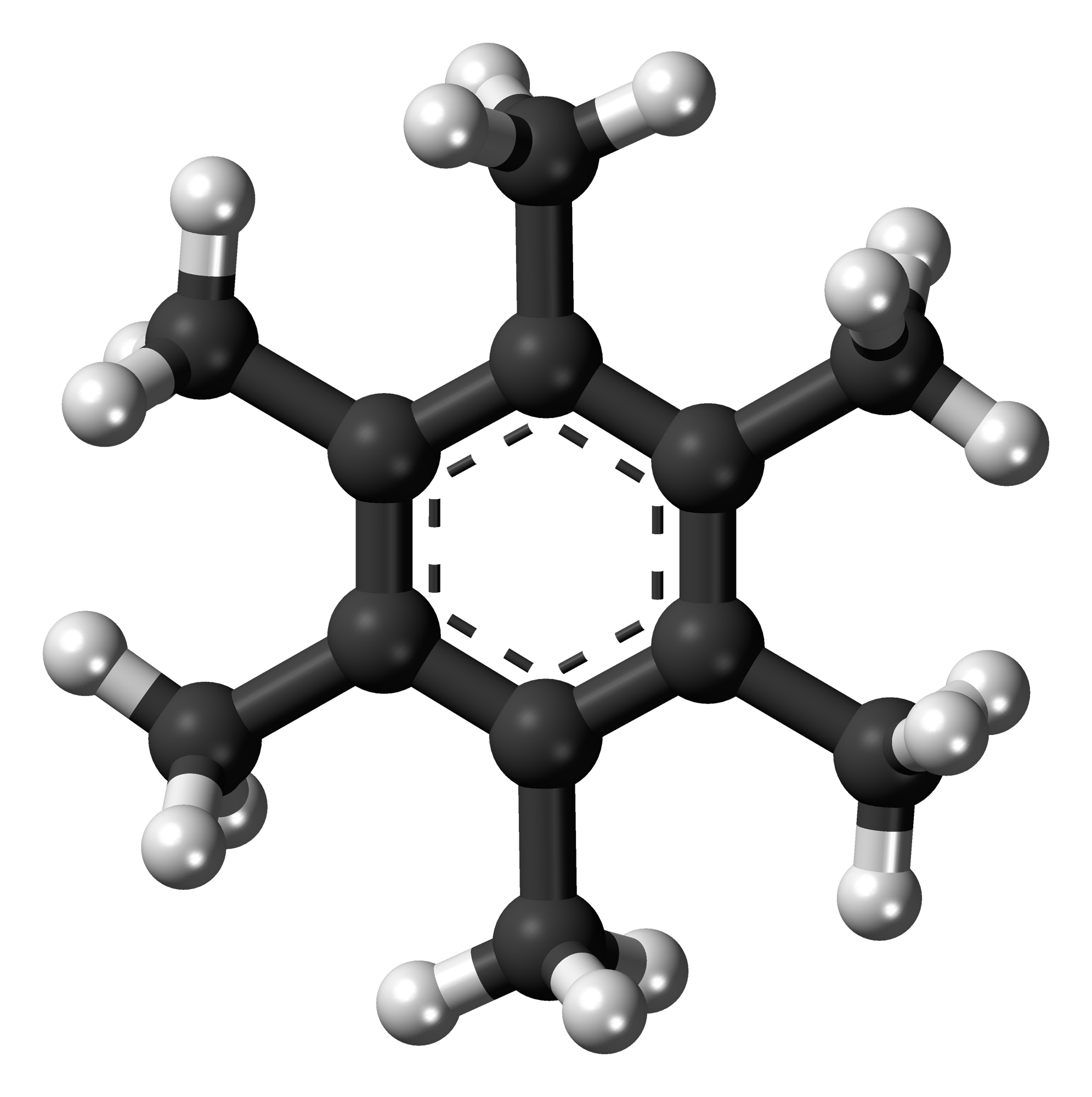

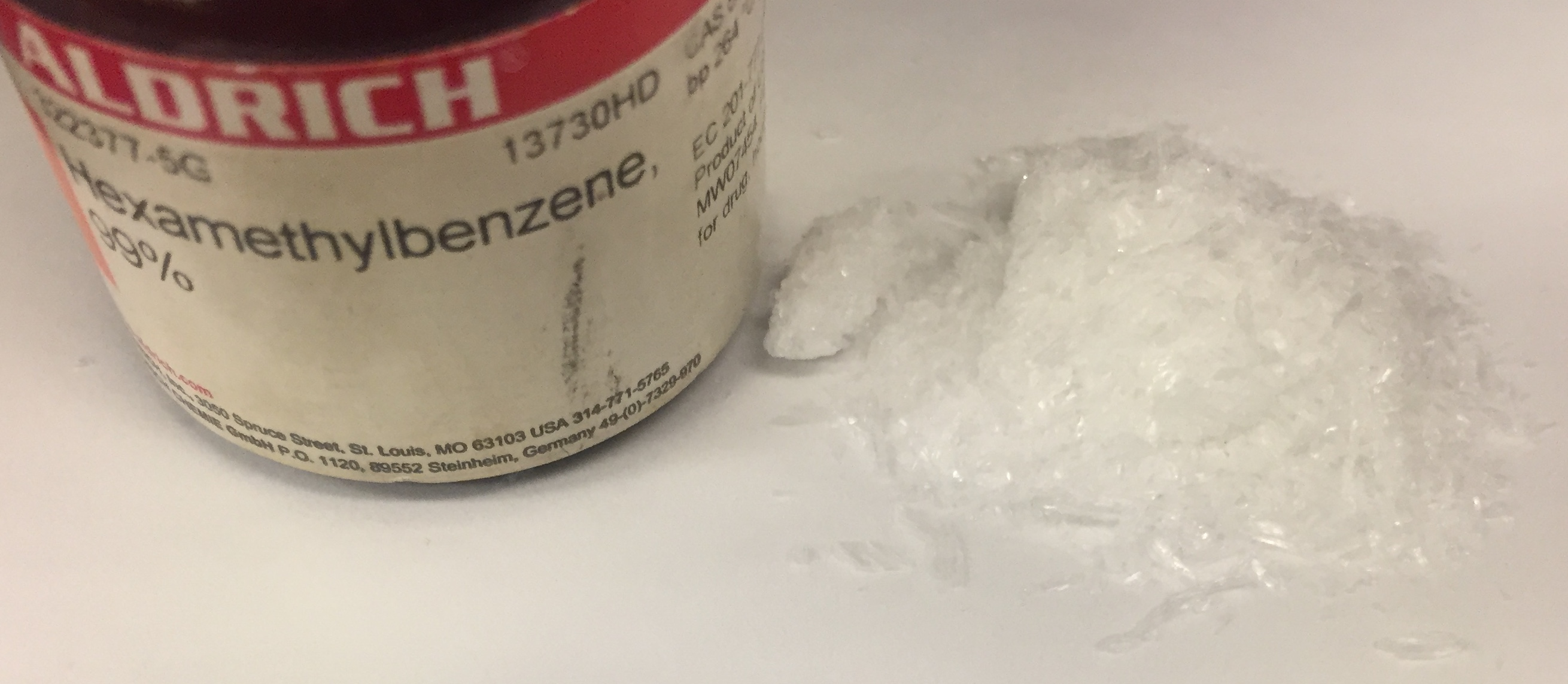

Names
- Preferred IUPAC name Hexamethylbenzene
- Other names 1,2,3,4,5,6-Hexamethylbenzene; Mellitene

Identifiers
CAS Number	87-85-4
3D model (JSmol)	Interactive image
ChEBI	CHEBI:39001
ChemSpider	6642
ECHA InfoCard	100.001.616
PubChem CID	6908
UNII	J8SD5741V8
CompTox Dashboard (EPA)	DTXSID3058957
- InChI: InChI=1S/C12H18/c1-7-8(2)10(4)12(6)11(5)9(7)3/h1-6H3 Key: YUWFEBAXEOLKSG-UHFFFAOYSA-N; InChI=1/C12H18/c1-7-8(2)10(4)12(6)11(5)9(7)3/h1-6H3 Key: YUWFEBAXEOLKSG-UHFFFAOYAF
- SMILES: c1(c(c(c(c(c1C)C)C)C)C)C

Properties
Chemical formula	C_{12}H_{18}
Molar mass	162.276 g·mol^{−1}
Appearance	White crystalline powder
Density	1.0630 g cm^{−3}
Melting point	165.6 ± 0.7 °C
Boiling point	265.2 °C (509.4 °F; 538.3 K)
Solubility in water	insoluble
Solubility	acetic acid, acetone, benzene, chloroform, diethyl ether, ethanol
- Except where otherwise noted, data are given for materials in their standard state (at 25 °C [77 °F], 100 kPa). verify (what is ?) Infobox references

Hexamethylbenzene, also known as mellitene, is a hydrocarbon with the molecular formula C_{12}H_{18} and the condensed structural formula C_{6}(CH_{3})_{6}. It is an aromatic compound and a derivative of benzene, where benzene's six hydrogen atoms have each been replaced by a methyl group. In 1929, Kathleen Lonsdale reported the crystal structure of hexamethylbenzene, demonstrating that the central ring is hexagonal and flat and thereby ending an ongoing debate about the physical parameters of the benzene system. This was a historically significant result, both for the field of X-ray crystallography and for understanding aromaticity.

Hexamethylbenzene can be oxidised to mellitic acid, which is found in nature as its aluminium salt in the rare mineral mellite. Hexamethylbenzene can be used as a ligand in organometallic compounds. An example from organoruthenium chemistry shows structural change in the ligand associated with changes in the oxidation state of the metal centre, though the same change is not observed in the analogous organoiron system.

== Nomenclature and properties ==
The complete IUPAC name for this compound is 1,2,3,4,5,6-hexamethylbenzene. The locants (the numbers in front of the name) are superfluous, however, as the name hexamethylbenzene uniquely identifies a single substance and thus is the formal IUPAC name for the compound. It is an aromatic compound, with six π electrons (satisfying Hückel's rule) delocalised over a cyclic planar system; each of the six ring carbon atoms is sp^{2} hybridised and displays trigonal planar geometry, while each methyl carbon is tetrahedral with sp^{3} hybridisation, consistent with the empirical description of its structure. Solid hexamethylbenzene occurs as colourless to white crystalline orthorhombic prisms or needles with a melting point of 165–166 °C, a boiling point of 268 °C, and a density of 1.0630 g cm^{−3}. It is insoluble in water, but soluble in organic solvents including benzene and ethanol.

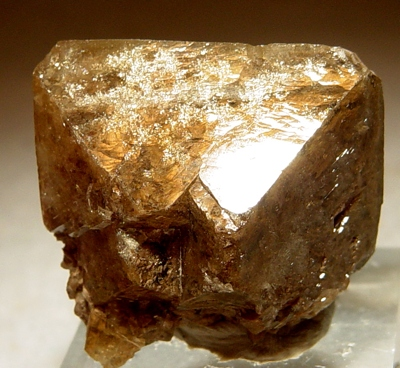
The mineral mellite (left) is composed of a hydrated aluminium salt of mellitic acid (right)

Hexamethylbenzene is sometimes called mellitene, a name derived from mellite, a rare honey-coloured mineral (μέλι meli (GEN μέλιτος melitos) is the Greek word for honey.) Mellite is composed of a hydrated aluminium salt of benzenehexacarboxylic acid (mellitic acid), with formula Al_{2}[C_{6}(CO_{2})_{6}]•16H_{2}O. Mellitic acid itself can be derived from the mineral, and subsequent reduction yields mellitene. Conversely, mellitene can be oxidised to form mellitic acid:

Treatment of hexamethylbenzene with a superelectrophilic mixture of methyl chloride and aluminum trichloride (a source of Me^{δ⊕}Cl---^{δ⊖}AlCl_{3}) gives heptamethylbenzenium cation, one of the first carbocations to be directly observed.

=== Structure ===
In 1927 Kathleen Lonsdale determined the solid structure of hexamethylbenzene from crystals provided by Christopher Kelk Ingold. Her X-ray diffraction analysis was published in Nature and was subsequently described as "remarkable ... for that early date". Lonsdale described the work in her book Crystals and X-Rays, explaining that she recognised that, though the unit cell was triclinic, the diffraction pattern had pseudo-hexagonal symmetry that allowed the structural possibilities to be restricted sufficiently for a trial-and-error approach to produce a model. This work definitively showed that hexamethylbenzene is flat and that the carbon-to-carbon distances within the ring are the same, providing crucial evidence in understanding the nature of aromaticity.

== Preparation ==
The compound can be prepared by reacting phenol with methanol at elevated temperatures over a suitable solid catalyst such as alumina. The mechanism of the process has been studied extensively, with several intermediates having been identified. Alkyne trimerisation of dimethylacetylene also yields hexamethylbenzene in the presence of a suitable catalyst.

In 1880, Joseph Achille Le Bel and William H. Greene reported what has been described as an "extraordinary" zinc chloride-catalysed one-pot synthesis of hexamethylbenzene from methanol. At the catalyst's melting point (283 °C), the reaction has a Gibbs free energy (ΔG) of −1090 kJ mol^{−1} and can be idealised as:

15 CH_{3}OH → C_{6}(CH_{3})_{6} + 3 CH_{4} + 15 H_{2}O

Le Bel and Greene rationalised the process as involving aromatisation by condensation of methylene units, formed by dehydration of methanol molecules, followed by complete Friedel–Crafts methylation of the resulting benzene ring with chloromethane generated in situ. The major products were a mixture of saturated hydrocarbons, with hexamethylbenzene as a minor product. Hexamethylbenzene is also produced as a minor product in the Friedel–Crafts alkylation synthesis of durene from p-xylene, and can be produced by alkylation in good yield from durene or pentamethylbenzene.

Hexamethylbenzene is typically prepared in the gas phase at elevated temperatures over solid catalysts. An early approach to preparing hexamethylbenzene involved reacting a mixture of acetone and methanol vapours over an alumina catalyst at 400 °C. Combining phenols with methanol over alumina in a dry carbon dioxide atmosphere at 410–440 °C also produces hexamethylbenzene, though as part of a complex mixture of anisole (methoxybenzene), cresols (methylphenols), and other methylated phenols. An Organic Syntheses preparation, using methanol and phenol with an alumina catalyst at 530 °C, gives approximately a 66% yield, though synthesis under different conditions has also been reported.

The mechanisms of such surface-mediated reactions have been investigated, with an eye to achieving greater control over the outcome of the reaction, especially in search of selective and controlled ortho-methylation. Both anisole and pentamethylbenzene have been reported as intermediates in the process. Valentin Koptyug and co-workers found that both hexamethylcyclohexadienone isomers (2,3,4,4,5,6- and 2,3,4,5,6,6-) are intermediates in the process, undergoing methyl migration to form the 1,2,3,4,5,6-hexamethylbenzene carbon skeleton.

Trimerisation of three 2-butyne (dimethylacetylene) molecules yields hexamethylbenzene. The reaction is catalyzed by triphenylchromium tri-tetrahydrofuranate or by a complex of triisobutylaluminium and titanium tetrachloride.

== Applications and reactions ==
Hexamethylbenzene has no commercial or widespread uses. It is exclusively of interest for chemical research. Most applications of hexamethylbenzene are as a chemical feedstock, although it has also been used as a solvent for ^{3}He-NMR spectroscopy.

Oxidation with trifluoroperacetic acid or hydrogen peroxide gives 2,3,4,5,6,6-hexamethyl-2,4-cyclohexadienone:

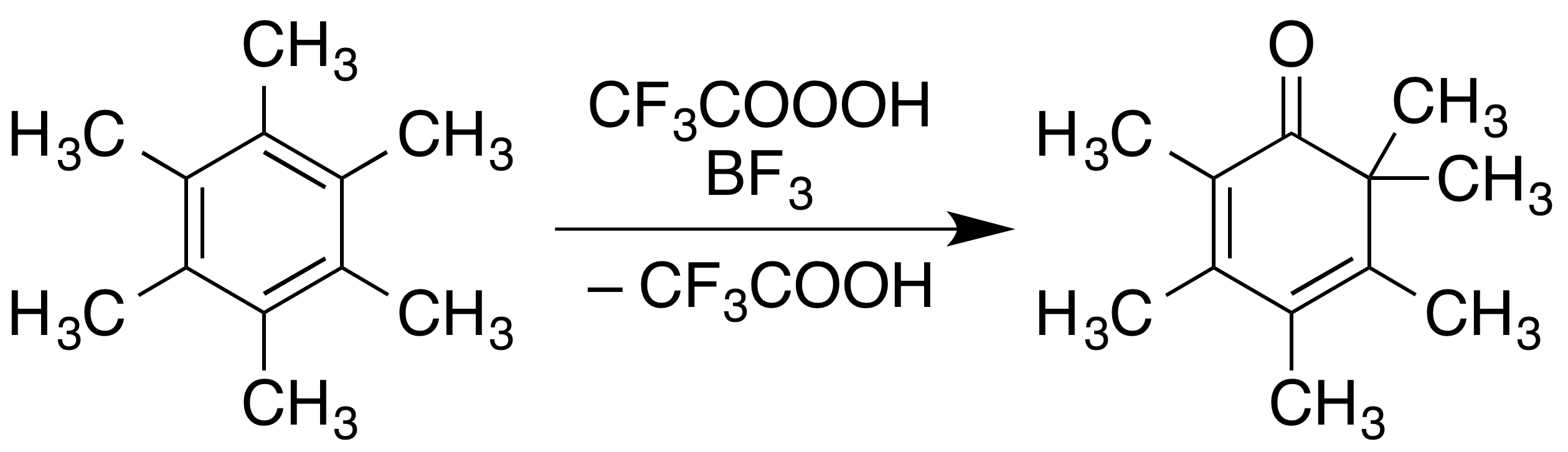

As with benzene itself, the electron-rich aromatic system in hexamethylbenzene allows it to act as a ligand in organometallic chemistry. Such complexes have been reported for a variety of metal centres, including cobalt, chromium, iron, rhenium, rhodium, ruthenium, and titanium. It also π-stacks to form an orange-yellow 1:1 charge-transfer adduct with picryl chloride.

=== Organometallic chemistry ===
The electron-donating nature of the methyl groups—both that there are six of them individually and that there are six meta pairs among them—enhance the basicity of the central ring by six to seven orders of magnitude relative to benzene.

Known cations of sandwich complexes of cobalt and rhodium with hexamethylbenzene take the form [M(C_{6}(CH_{3})_{6})_{2}]^{n+} (M = Co, Fe, Rh, Ru; n = 1, 2), where the metal centre is bound by the π electrons of the two arene moieties, and can easily be synthesised from appropriate metal salts by ligand exchange, for example:

CoBr_{2} + 2 AlBr_{3} → [Co(C_{6}(CH_{3})_{6})_{2}]^{2+} + 2 AlBr^{−}_{4}

The complexes can undergo redox reactions. The rhodium and cobalt dications undergo a reversible one-electron reduction with a suitable active metal (aluminium for the cobalt system, zinc for the rhodium), as follows:

3 [Co(C_{6}(CH_{3})_{6})_{2}]^{2+} + Al → 3 [Co(C_{6}(CH_{3})_{6})_{2}]^{+} + Al^{3+}

In the field of organoruthenium chemistry, the redox interconversion of the analogous two-electron reduction of the dication and its neutral product occurs at −1.02 V in acetonitrile and is accompanied by a structural change. The hapticity of one of the hexamethylbenzene ligands changes with the oxidation state of the ruthenium centre, the dication [Ru(η^{6}-C_{6}(CH_{3})_{6})_{2}]^{2+} being reduced to [Ru(η^{4}-C_{6}(CH_{3})_{6})(η^{6}-C_{6}(CH_{3})_{6})], with the structural change allowing each complex to comply with the 18-electron rule and maximise stability.

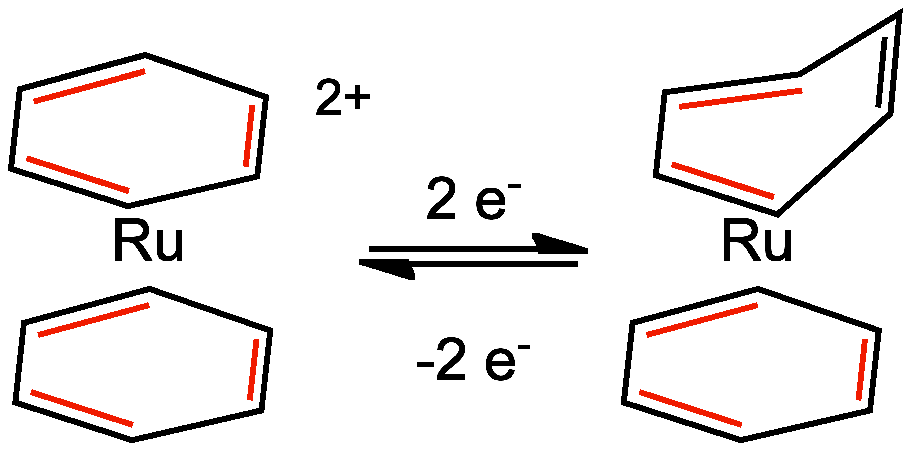
The structure of the [Ru(C_{6}(CH_{3})_{6})_{2}]^{n+} moiety changes with the oxidation state of the metal centre Left: n = 2, [Ru^{II}(η^{6}-C_{6}(CH_{3})_{6})_{2}]^{2+} Right: n = 0, [Ru^{0}(η^{4}-C_{6}(CH_{3})_{6})(η^{6}-C_{6}(CH_{3})_{6})] Methyl groups omitted for clarity. The electron-pairs involved with carbon–ruthenium bonding are in red.

The equivalent iron(II) complex undergoes a reversible one-electron reduction (at −0.48 V in aqueous ethanol), but the two-electron reduction (at −1.46 V) is irreversible, suggesting a change in structure different from that found in the ruthenium system.

=== Dication ===
As discovered in the 1960s and '70s, two-electron oxidation of hexamethyl Dewar benzene gives pyramid-shaped ions with composition C_{6}(CH_{3})_{6}H^{+} and C_{6}(CH_{3})^{2+}_{6}:

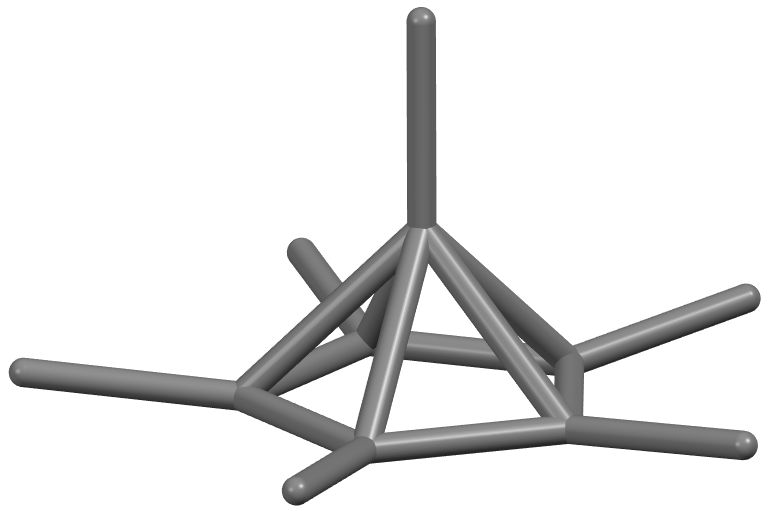
Three-dimensional representation of the pyramidal carbocation with composition C_{6}(CH_{3})^{2+}_{6}

Synthesis from hexamethylbenzene would offer a cheaper feedstock to the same end.

Spectroscopic investigation of the two-electron oxidation of benzene at very low temperatures (below 4 K) shows that a hexagonal dication forms and then rapidly rearranges into the same pyramidal structure:

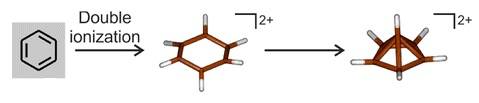

Two-electron oxidation of hexamethylbenzene could therefore result in a near-identical rearrangement to a pyramidal carbocation. However, this method has not successfully produced the dication in bulk.
