= Pentamethylbenzene =

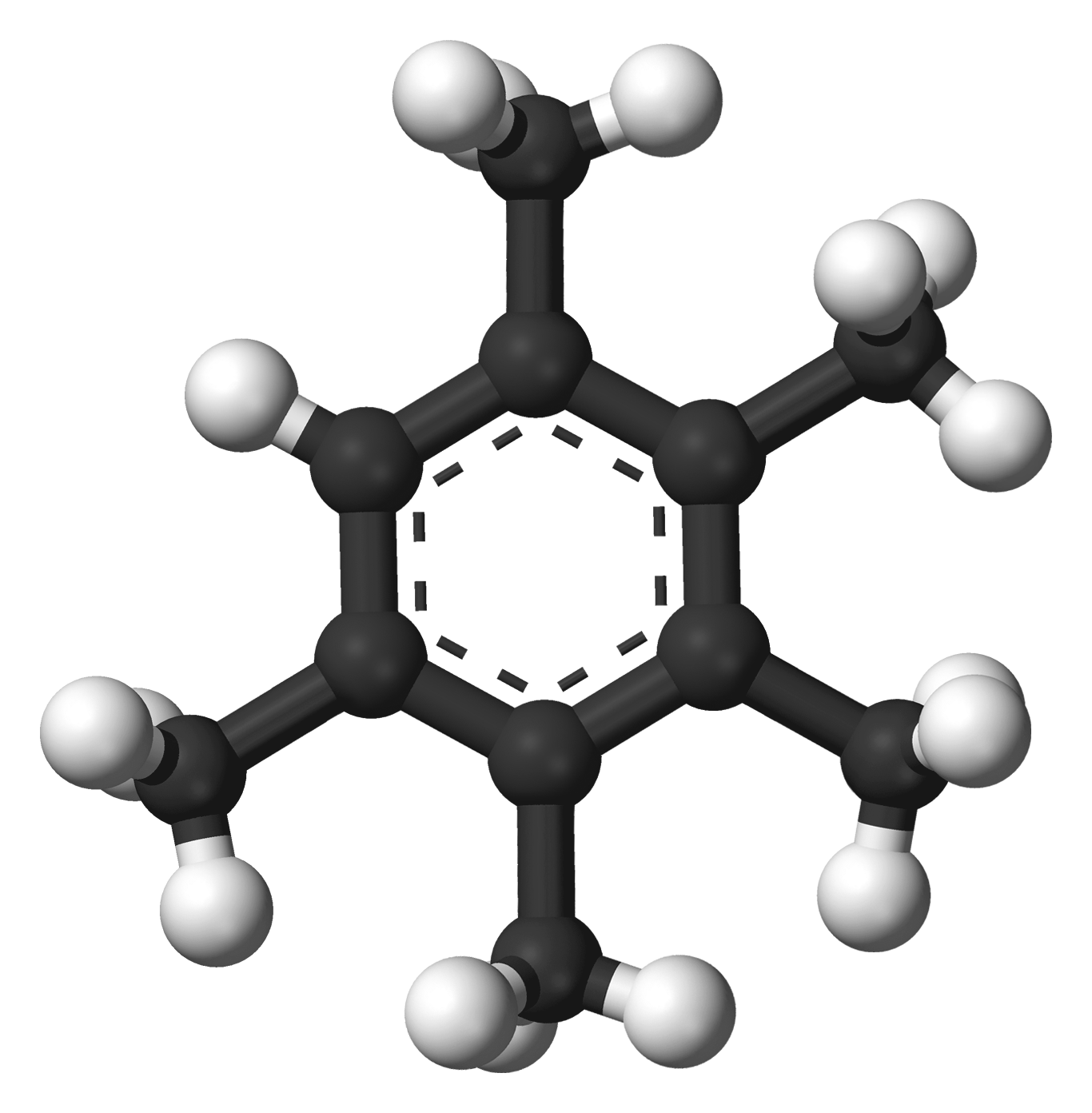

Names
- Preferred IUPAC name 1,2,3,4,5-Pentamethylbenzene
- Other names Pentamethylbenzene, Pentzene

Identifiers
CAS Number	700-12-9
3D model (JSmol)	Interactive image
ChEBI	CHEBI:38998
ChemSpider	12259
ECHA InfoCard	100.010.763
PubChem CID	12784
UNII	H6JLD3AI98
CompTox Dashboard (EPA)	DTXSID6061024
- InChI: InChI=1S/C11H16/c1-7-6-8(2)10(4)11(5)9(7)3/h6H,1-5H3 Key: BEZDDPMMPIDMGJ-UHFFFAOYSA-N; InChI=1/C11H16/c1-7-6-8(2)10(4)11(5)9(7)3/h6H,1-5H3 Key: BEZDDPMMPIDMGJ-UHFFFAOYAT
- SMILES: Cc1cc(C)c(C)c(C)c1C

Properties
Chemical formula	C_{11}H_{16}
Molar mass	148.249 g·mol^{−1}
Density	0.917 g/cm^{3}
Melting point	54.4 °C (129.9 °F; 327.5 K)
Boiling point	232 °C (450 °F; 505 K)
Solubility in organic solvents	soluble

Hazards
- Occupational safety and health (OHS/OSH)
Main hazards	Flammable
- Except where otherwise noted, data are given for materials in their standard state (at 25 °C [77 °F], 100 kPa). verify (what is ?) Infobox references

Pentamethylbenzene is an organic compound with the formula C_{6}H(CH_{3})_{5}. It is a colourless solid with a sweet odor. The compound is classified as an aromatic hydrocarbon. It is a relatively easily oxidized benzene derivative, with E_{1/2} of 1.95 V vs NHE.

== Synthesis and reactions ==
It is obtained as a minor product in the Friedel–Crafts methylation of xylene to durene (1,2,4,5-tetramethylbenzene). Like durene, pentamethylbenzene is rather electron-rich and undergoes electrophilic substitution readily. Indeed, it is used as a scavenger for carbocations.

Pentamethylbenzene has been observed as an intermediate in the formation of hexamethylbenzene from phenol and alkylation of durene or pentamethylbenzene has been reported as a suitable starting material for the synthesis of hexamethylbenzene.
