= Fenoprop =

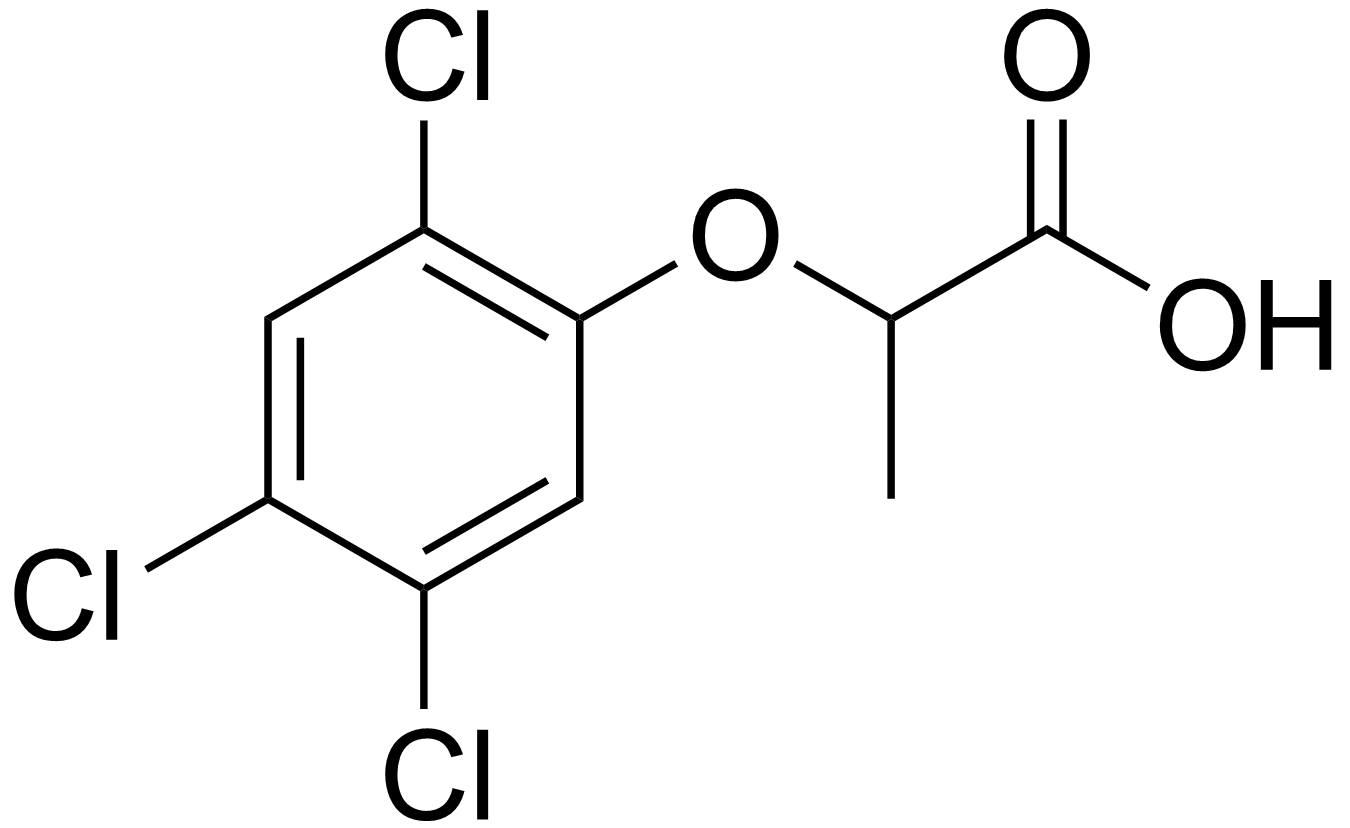

Names
- Preferred IUPAC name rac-(2R)-2-(2,4,5-trichlorophenoxy)propanoic acid
- Other names 2-(2,4,5-Trichlorophenoxy)propionic acid Silvex

Identifiers
CAS Number	93-72-1
3D model (JSmol)	Interactive image
Abbreviations	2,4,5-TP
ChEBI	CHEBI:34758
ChEMBL	ChEMBL460296
ChemSpider	6891
ECHA InfoCard	100.002.066
KEGG	C14532
PubChem CID	7158
UNII	D2HZL58IS3
CompTox Dashboard (EPA)	DTXSID0021387
- InChI: InChI=1S/C9H7Cl3O3/c1-4(9(13)14)15-8-3-6(11)5(10)2-7(8)12/h2-4H,1H3,(H,13,14) Key: ZLSWBLPERHFHIS-UHFFFAOYSA-N; InChI=1/C9H7Cl3O3/c1-4(9(13)14)15-8-3-6(11)5(10)2-7(8)12/h2-4H,1H3,(H,13,14) Key: ZLSWBLPERHFHIS-UHFFFAOYAC
- SMILES: Clc1cc(OC(C(=O)O)C)c(Cl)cc1Cl

Properties
Chemical formula	C_{9}H_{7}Cl_{3}O_{3}
Molar mass	269.51
Appearance	White powder
Density	1.21 g/cm^{3} at 20 °C
Melting point	180 °C (356 °F; 453 K)
log P	3.8 (20 °C)
Acidity (pK_{a})	2.84
- Except where otherwise noted, data are given for materials in their standard state (at 25 °C [77 °F], 100 kPa). Infobox references

Fenoprop, also called 2,4,5-TP, is the organic compound 2-(2,4,5-trichlorophenoxy)propionic acid. It is a phenoxy herbicide and a plant growth regulator, an analog of 2,4,5-T in which the latter's acetic acid sidechain is replaced with a propionate group (with an extra CH_{3}). The addition of this extra methyl group creates a chiral centre in the molecule and useful biological activity is found only in the (2R)-isomer. The compound's mechanism of action is to mimic the auxin growth hormone indoleacetic acid (IAA). When sprayed on plants it induces rapid, uncontrolled growth. As with 2,4,5-T, fenoprop is toxic to shrubs and trees.

The name Silvex was used in the USA but it has been banned from use there since 1985. According to the Environmental Protection Agency its greatest use was as a postemergence herbicide for control of woody plants, and broadleaf herbaceous weeds in rice and bluegrass turf, in sugarcane, in rangeland improvement programs and on lawns. Fenoprop and some of its esters were in use from 1945 but are now obsolete.

== See also ==
- Phenoxy herbicides
- 2,4,5-Trichlorophenoxyacetic acid
