= Phenoxy herbicide =

Class of herbicide

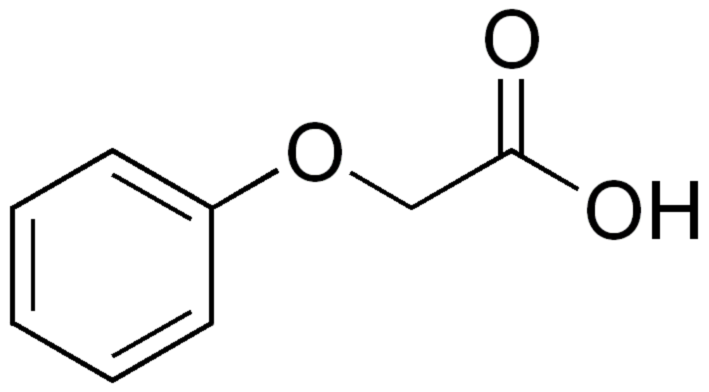
Phenoxyacetic acid, the partial structure which many of these herbicides have in common

Phenoxy herbicides (or "phenoxies") are two families of chemicals that have been developed as commercially important herbicides, widely used in agriculture. They share the part structure of phenoxyacetic acid.

== Auxins ==
The first group to be discovered act by mimicking the auxin growth hormone indoleacetic acid (IAA). When sprayed on broad-leaf plants they induce rapid, uncontrolled growth ("growing to death"). Thus when applied to monocotyledonous crops such as wheat or maize (corn), they selectively kill broad-leaf weeds, leaving the crops relatively unaffected.

IAA

MCPA

2,4-D

2,4,5-T

Introduced in 1946, these herbicides were in widespread use in agriculture by the middle of the 1950s. The best known phenoxy herbicides are (4-chloro-2-methylphenoxy)acetic acid (MCPA), 2,4-dichlorophenoxyacetic acid (2,4-D) and 2,4,5-trichlorophenoxyacetic acid (2,4,5-T). Analogues of each of these three compounds, with an extra methyl group attached next to the carboxylic acid, were subsequently commercialised as mecoprop, dichlorprop and fenoprop. The addition of the methyl group creates a chiral centre in these molecules and biological activity is found only in the (2R)-isomer (illustrated for dichlorprop).

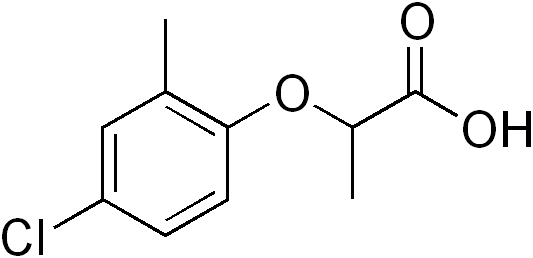
Mecoprop

Dichlorprop

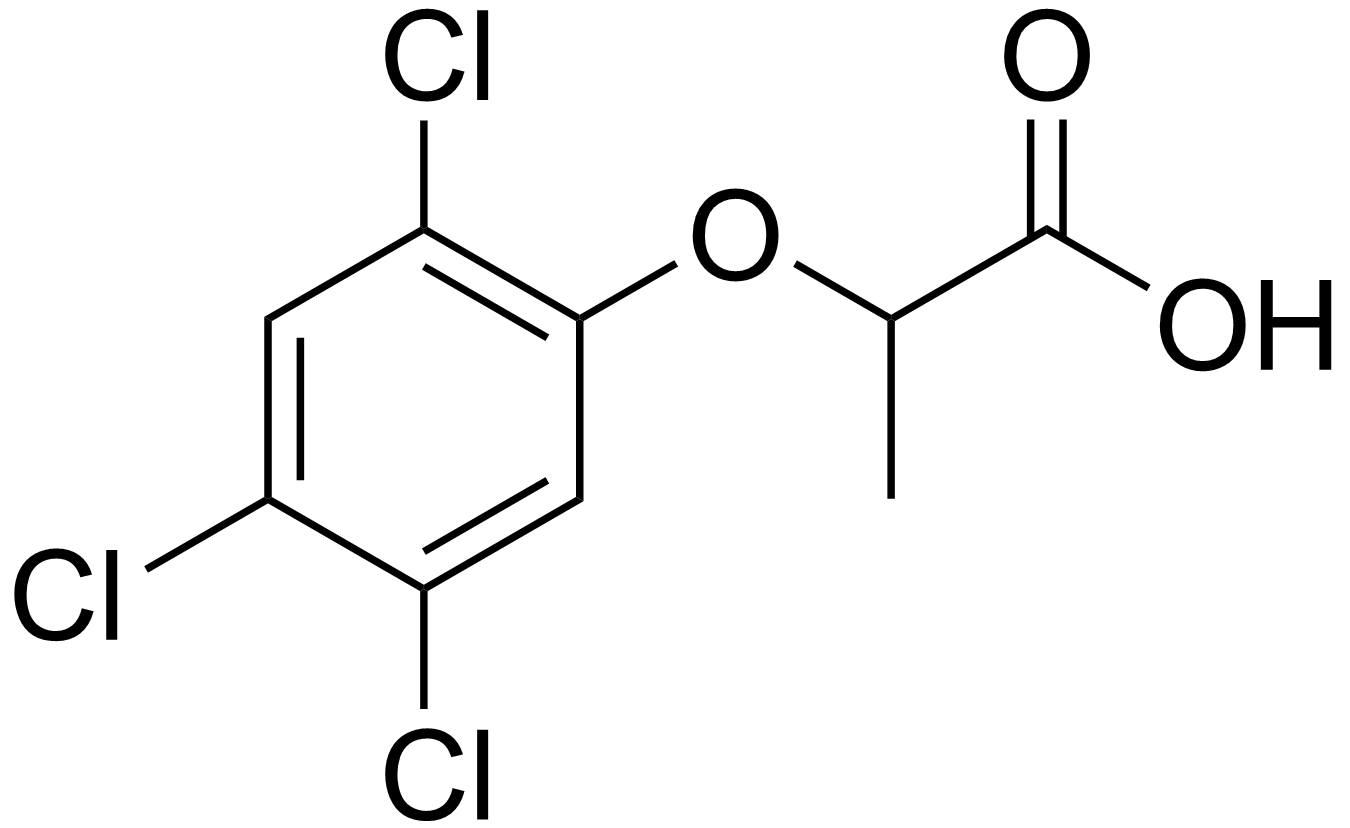
Fenoprop

2,4-DB

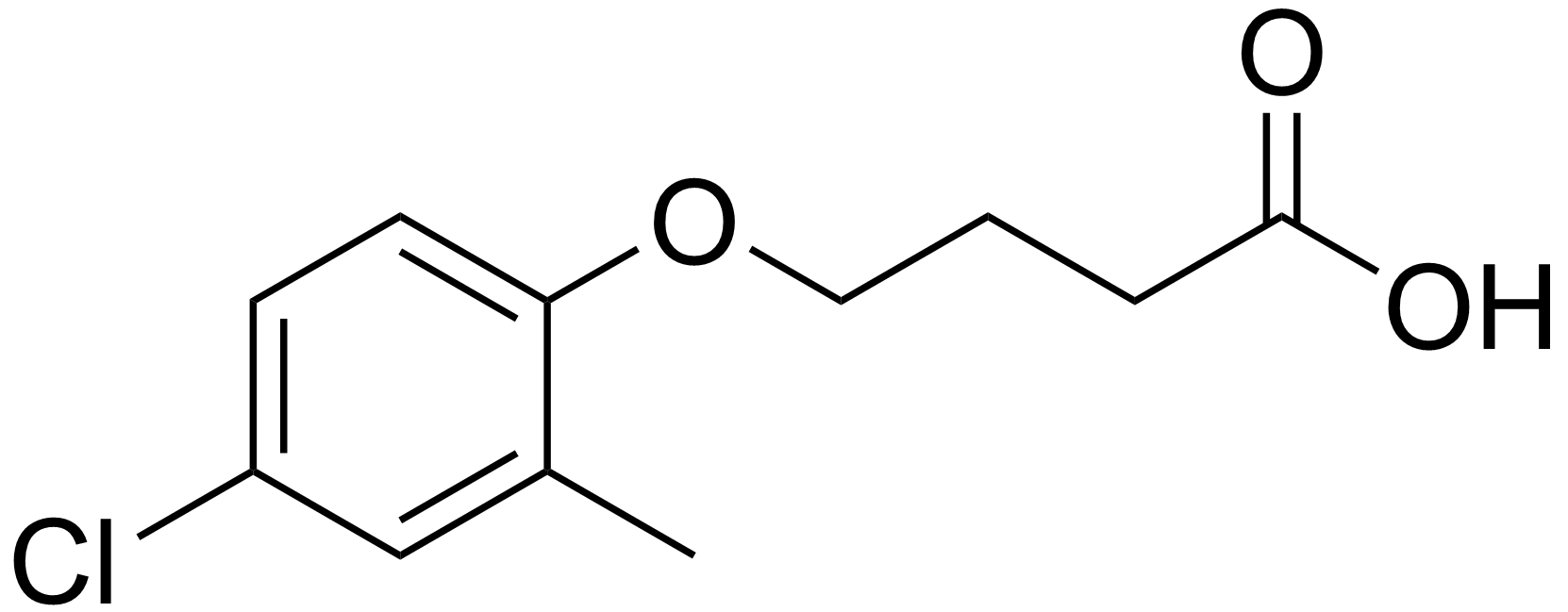
MCPB

Other members of this group include 4-(2,4-dichlorophenoxy)butyric acid (2,4-DB) and 4-(4-chloro-2-methylphenoxy)butyric acid (MCPB) which act as propesticides for 2,4-D and MCPA respectively: that is, they are converted in plants to these active ingredients. All the auxin herbicides retain activity when applied as salts and esters since these are also capable of producing the parent acid in situ.

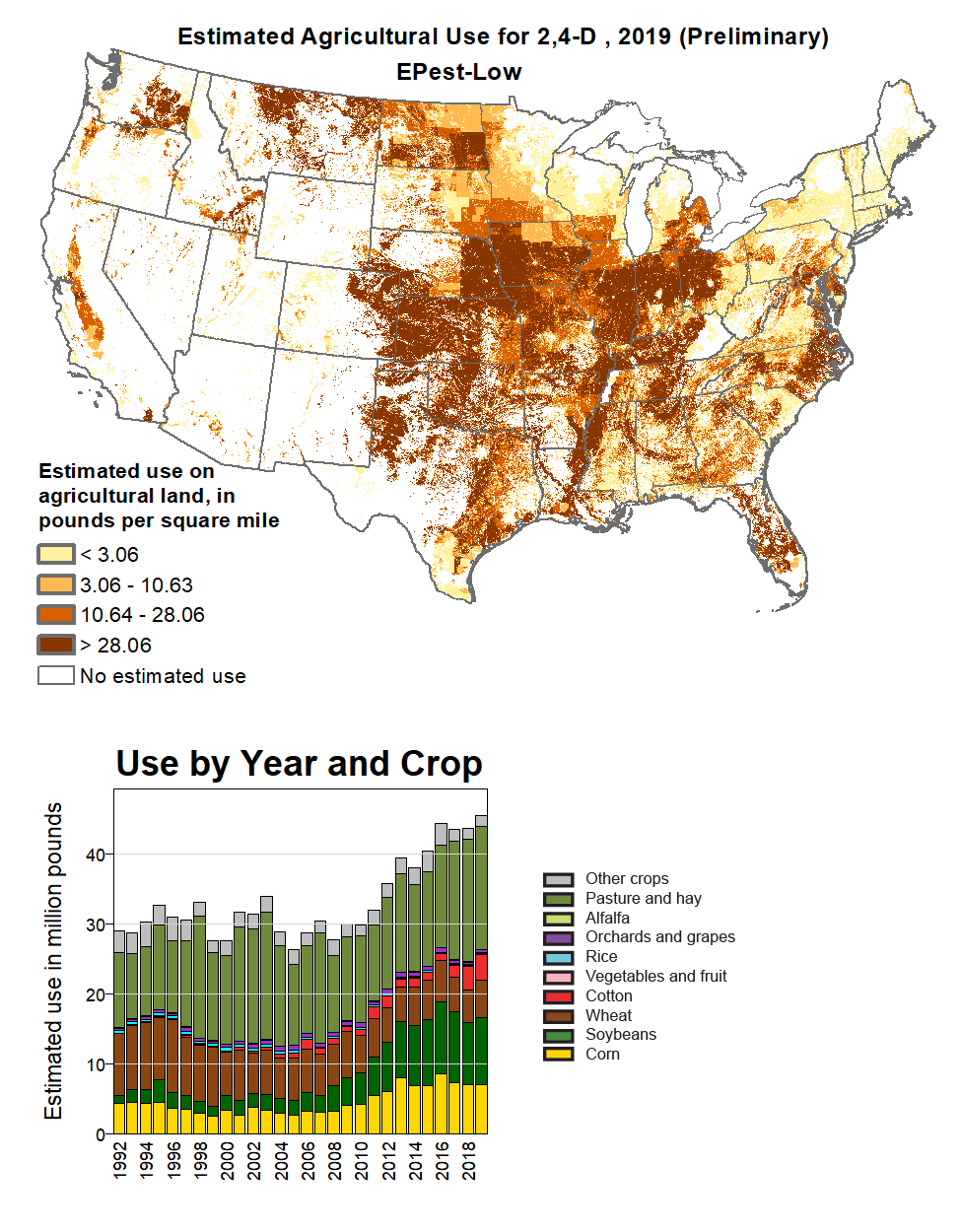
US Geological Survey estimate of 2,4-D use in the USA to 2019

The use of herbicides in US agriculture is mapped by the US Geological Survey. As of 2019, 2,4-D was the most used of the auxins. 45,000,000 pounds (20,000,000 kg) were sprayed that year, compared to 2,000,000 pounds (910,000 kg) of the next most heavily applied, MCPA. The other auxin now used in comparable amounts to 2,4-D is dicamba, where the 2019 figure was 30,000,000 pounds (14,000,000 kg). It is a benzoic acid rather than a phenoxyacetic acid whose use has grown rapidly since 2016 as crops genetically modified to be resistant to it have been cultivated.

== ACCase inhibitors ==
In the 1970s, agrochemical companies were working to develop new herbicides to be complementary to the auxins. The aim was to find materials which would selectively control grass weeds in broad-leaf crops such as cotton and soybean.

Cyhalofop: X=CH, R^{1}=CN, R^{2}=F Diclofop: X=CH, R^{1}=R^{2}=Cl Chlorazifop: X=N, R^{1}=R^{2}=Cl Fluazifop: X=N, R^{1}=CF_{3}, R^{2}=H Haloxyfop: X=N, R^{1}=CF_{3}, R^{2}=Cl

In 1973, Hoechst AG filed patents on a new class of compound, the aryloxyphenoxypropionates, which showed such selectivity and led to the commercialisation of diclofop. Then the Japanese company Ishihara Sangyo Kaisha (ISK) found improved biological activity in an analogue, chlorazifop, which replaced the aryloxy portion of diclofop with a pyridine ring containing the same two chlorine substituents. This area of research became very competitive and within three weeks of one another in 1977 ISK, Dow Chemicals and Imperial Chemical Industries (ICI) all filed patents covering another group of analogues, with a trifluoromethyl (CF_{3}) group in place of one of the chlorine atoms in the pyridine. Subsequently, ISK and ICI cross-licensed their intellectual property and first marketed fluazifop as its butyl ester in 1981 under the brand name Fusilade while Dow marketed haloxyfop as its methyl ester. All these compounds have an additional oxygen-linked aromatic group in the para position of the phenyl ring with its OCH(CH_{3})COOH group and as a class are called "fops", referring to their common fenoxy-phenoxy [sic] feature.

This group of herbicides acts by inhibiting plant acetyl-CoA carboxylase (ACCase), a completely different mechanism of action to that of the auxins. Their selectivity for grasses arises because they target the isoform of the enzyme present only in the plastids of these species, making them ineffective on broad-leaf weeds and other organisms including mammals. When applied as an ester, metabolism in the target plant leads to the parent acid which is responsible for the herbicidal action. It is a coincidence that it is the (2R) stereoisomer which binds to plant ACCase, just as that isomer is responsible for the activity of dichlorprop as an auxin.

Fenoxaprop-P-ethyl

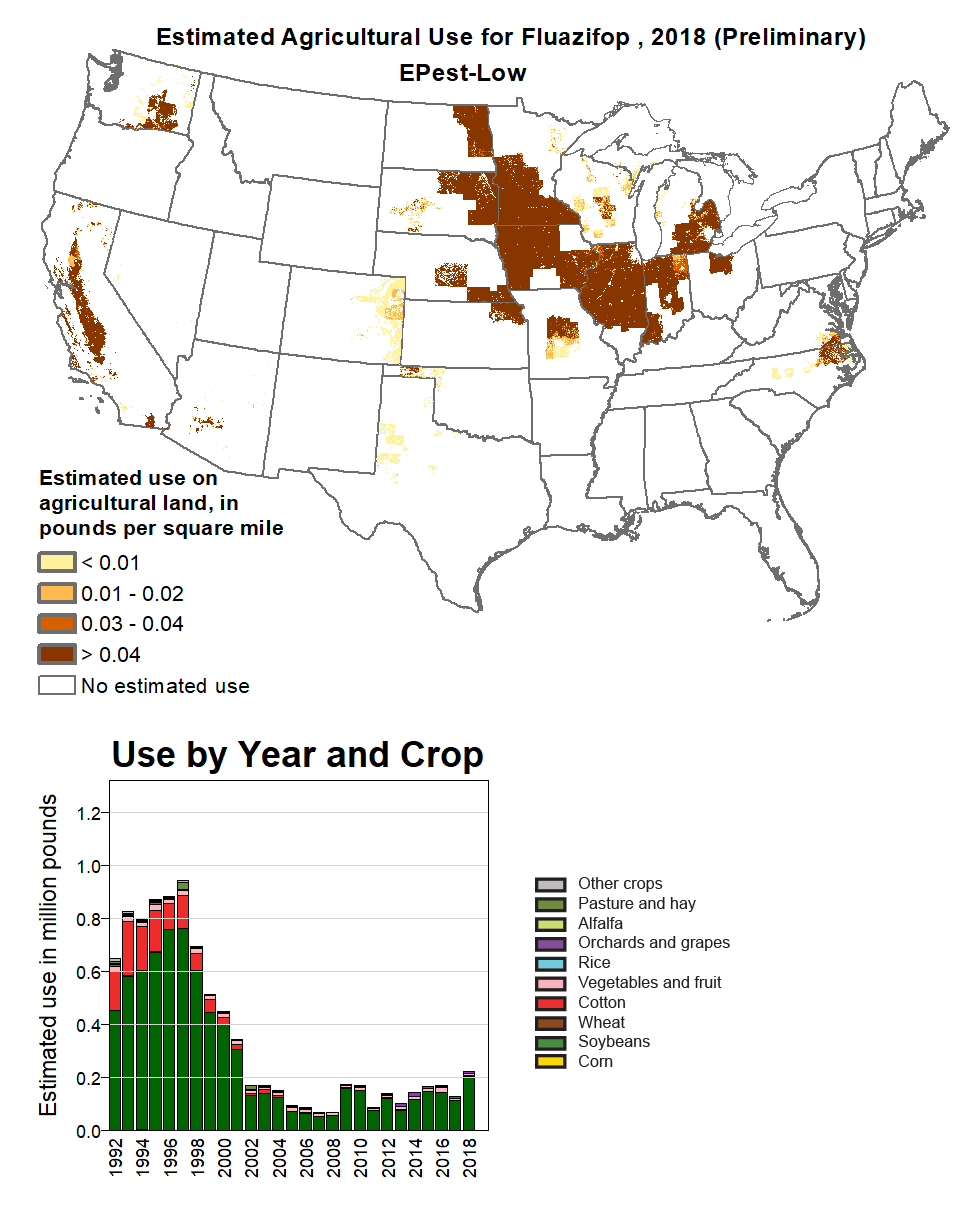
US Geological Survey estimate of fluazifop use in the USA to 2018

Salts and esters of this class of herbicide are active owing to their ability to metabolise to the corresponding parent acid. For example, fenoxaprop-P ethyl was introduced by Bayer Crop Science and quizalofop-P-ethyl by Nissan Chemical Corporation, both in 1989. In 1990, Dow introduced cyhalofop-P butyl for the control of weeds in rice. Fluazifop-P butyl still has significant use in the USA. 200,000 pounds (91,000 kg) were applied in 2018 — almost exclusively in soyabean. The "P" in the name of these materials refers to their use now as single enantiomers.

== Resistance ==
Cummins et al., 1999, 2009, and 2013 find that Alopecurus myocuroides's mechanism of fenoxaprop-P-ethyl resistance reduces hydrogen peroxide concentrations at the application site, while the wild type responds with an increase.
