= Picryl chloride =

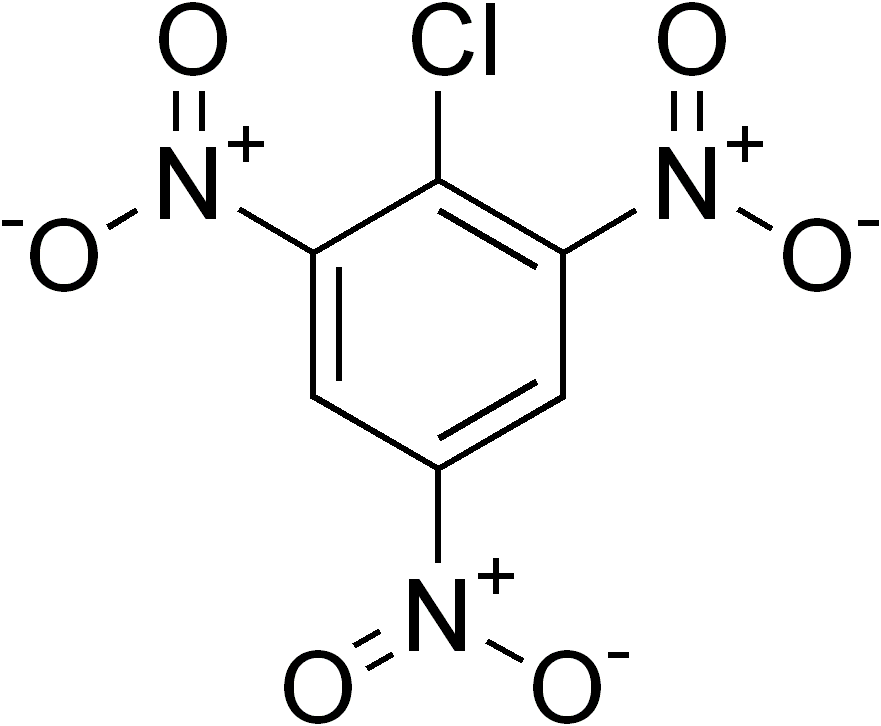

Names
- Preferred IUPAC name 2-Chloro-1,3,5-trinitrobenzene
- Other names 2,4,6-Trinitrochlorobenzene, 2-chloro-1,3,5-trinitrobenzene, TNCB

Identifiers
CAS Number	88-88-0
3D model (JSmol)	Interactive image
ChemSpider	6687
ECHA InfoCard	100.001.695
EC Number	201-864-3
PubChem CID	6953
UNII	Z4ZG7O5SZ9
UN number	0155; 3365 (wetted)
CompTox Dashboard (EPA)	DTXSID3025910
- InChI: InChI=1S/C6H2ClN3O6/c7-6-4(9(13)14)1-3(8(11)12)2-5(6)10(15)16/h1-2H Key: HJRJRUMKQCMYDL-UHFFFAOYSA-N; InChI=1/C6H2ClN3O6/c7-6-4(9(13)14)1-3(8(11)12)2-5(6)10(15)16/h1-2H Key: HJRJRUMKQCMYDL-UHFFFAOYAU
- SMILES: C1=C(C=C(C(=C1[N+](=O)[O-])Cl)[N+](=O)[O-])[N+](=O)[O-]

Properties
Chemical formula	C_{6}H_{2}ClN_{3}O_{6}
Molar mass	247.55 g/mol
Appearance	Almost white or yellow needles
Melting point	83 °C

Hazards
- GHS labelling
Pictograms	(GHS01: Explosive) (GHS06: Toxic) (GHS09: Environmental hazard)
Signal word	Danger
Hazard statements	H201, H300, H310, H330, H410
Precautionary statements	P210, P230, P240, P250, P260, P262, P264, P270, P271, P273, P280, P284, P301+P310, P302+P350, P304+P340, P310, P320, P321, P330, P361, P363, P370+P380, P372, P373, P391, P401, P403+P233, P405, P501

Explosive data
Detonation velocity	7,200 m/s
- Except where otherwise noted, data are given for materials in their standard state (at 25 °C [77 °F], 100 kPa). verify (what is ?) Infobox references

Picryl chloride is an organic compound with the formula ClC_{6}H_{2}(NO_{2})_{3}. It is a bright yellow solid that is highly explosive, as is typical for polynitro aromatics such as picric acid. Its detonation velocity is 7,200 m/s.

== Reactions ==
The reactivity of picryl chloride is strongly influenced by the presence of three electron-withdrawing nitro groups. Consequently picryl chloride is an electrophile as illustrated by its reactivity toward sulfite to give the sulfonate:

ClC_{6}H_{2}(NO_{2})_{3} + Na_{2}SO_{3} → NaO_{3}SC_{6}H_{2}(NO_{2})_{3} + NaCl

Picryl chloride is also a strong electron acceptor. It forms a 1:1 charge-transfer complex with hexamethylbenzene.
