= Phenoxyacetic acid =

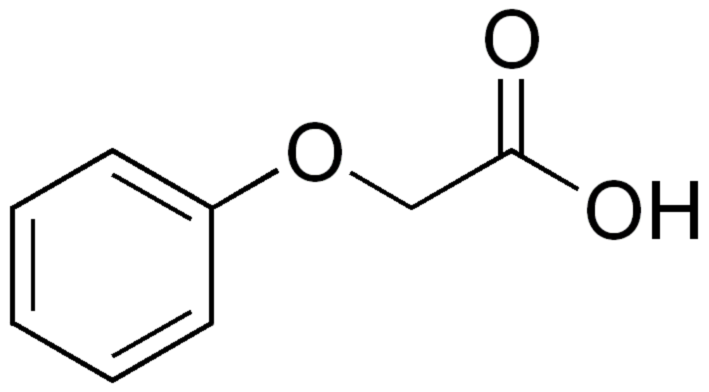

Names
- Preferred IUPAC name Phenoxyacetic acid

Identifiers
CAS Number	122-59-8
3D model (JSmol)	Interactive image
Beilstein Reference	907949
ChEBI	CHEBI:8075
ChEMBL	ChEMBL173521
ChemSpider	18107
ECHA InfoCard	100.004.143
EC Number	204-556-7
Gmelin Reference	142730
KEGG	C02181
PubChem CID	19188
UNII	YRC253429Q
UN number	3347
CompTox Dashboard (EPA)	DTXSID9025873
- InChI: InChI=1S/C8H8O3/c9-8(10)6-11-7-4-2-1-3-5-7/h1-5H,6H2,(H,9,10) Key: LCPDWSOZIOUXRV-UHFFFAOYSA-N
- SMILES: C1=CC=C(C=C1)OCC(=O)O

Properties
Chemical formula	C_{8}H_{8}O_{3}
Molar mass	152.15 g/mol
Appearance	White solid or tan powder
Odor	Sweet and sour
Melting point	98–99 °C (208–210 °F; 371–372 K)
log P	1.48
Acidity (pK_{a})	3.7

Hazards
- GHS labelling
Pictograms	(GHS07: Exclamation mark)
Signal word	Warning
Hazard statements	H302, H315, H319, H335
Precautionary statements	P261, P264, P270, P271, P280, P301+P312, P302+P352, P304+P340, P305+P351+P338, P312, P321, P330, P332+P313, P337+P313, P362, P403+P233, P405, P501
- Except where otherwise noted, data are given for materials in their standard state (at 25 °C [77 °F], 100 kPa). Infobox references

Phenoxyacetic acid, POA, is a white solid with the formula of C_{8}H_{8}O_{3}. Although not itself usefully active as an herbicide, it forms the part-structure of many phenoxy herbicide derivatives including MCPA and 2,4-D.

== Structure and synthesis ==
Phenoxyacetic acid is an O-phenyl derivative of glycolic acid. It is both a monocarboxylic acid and an aryl ether. Its preparation from sodium phenolate and sodium chloroacetate in hot water was first reported in 1880.

1) C_{6}H_{5}O^{−}Na^{+} + ClCH_{2}COO^{−}Na^{+} → C_{6}H_{5}OCH_{2}COO^{−}Na^{+} + NaCl

2) C_{6}H_{5}OCH_{2}COO^{−}Na^{+} + HCl → C_{6}H_{5}OCH_{2}COOH + NaCl

The phenolate anion reacts via nucleophilic attack on the methylene carbon of the chloroacetic acid, forming an ether bond.

== Properties ==
Phenoxyacetic acid is a white or clear crystalline compound at room temperature. When impure, it can appear to be a light tan to brown. The compound has a solubility in water of 12 g/L and is highly soluble in organic solvents including ethanol, diethyl ether and benzene. Phenoxyacetic acid is a weak acid and weak base with a pKa of 3.7.

== Uses ==
Phenoxyacetic acid has found minor uses as a food additive and perfume component and is categorised as "generally recognised as safe" in these applications.
