= Ruth Kanfer =

American professor of organizational psychology

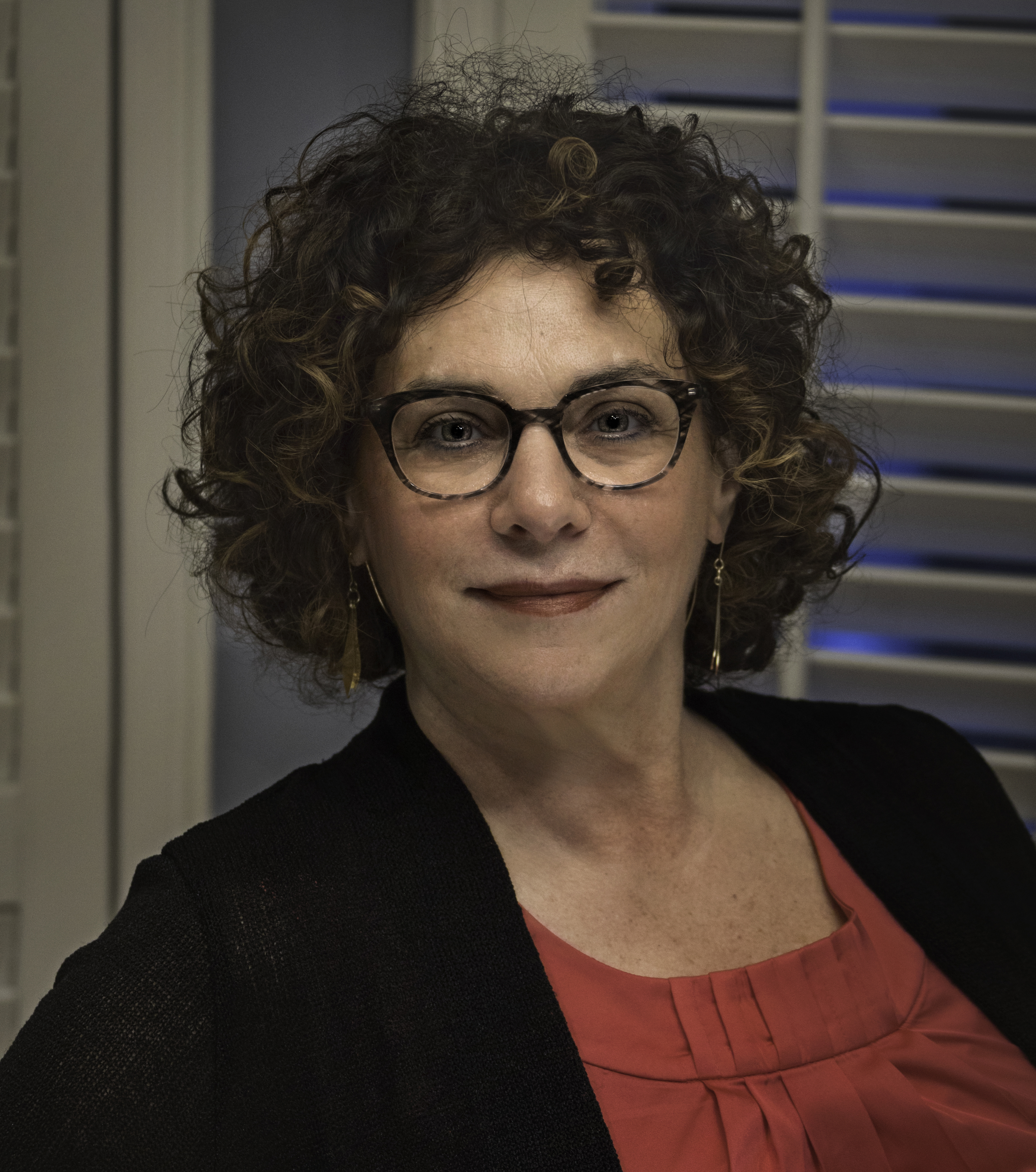
- Citizenship: American
- Education: Arizona State University (Ph.D. in Clinical Psychology) Arizona State University (M.A. in Clinical Psychology Miami University (B.A. in Psychology)
- Known for: motivation, goal setting, self-regulation, adult learning, work and aging, work transitions
- Awards: Distinguished Scientific Contributions Award from the Society for Industrial and Organizational Psychology(2008) William R. Owens Scholarly Achievement Award (with P. L. Ackerman) from the Society for Industrial and Organizational Psychology (2006) Outstanding Publication of the Year in Organizational Behavior Award (with P. L. Ackerman) from the Academy of Management (1989, 2004) Distinguished Scientific Award for an Early Career Contribution to Psychology (Applied Research) from the American Psychological Association (1989)
- Scientific career
- Fields: Psychology, Industrial and Organizational Psychology
- Workplaces: Georgia Institute of Technology (current) University of Minnesota (1984-1997) University of Illinois (1983-1984)
- Doctoral advisor: Antonette Zeiss

Ruth Kanfer is a psychologist and professor at Georgia Institute of Technology in the area of Industrial and Organizational Psychology. She is best known for her research in the fields of motivation, goal setting, self-regulation, job search, adult learning, and future of work. Kanfer has received numerous awards for her research contributions including the American Psychological Association Distinguished Scientific Award for an Early Career Contribution in Applied Research in 1989, the Society for Industrial and Organizational Psychology (SIOP) William R. Owens Scholarly Achievement Award in 2006 and the SIOP Distinguished Scientific Contributions Award in 2007. Ruth Kanfer has authored influential papers on a variety of topics including the interaction of cognitive abilities and motivation on performance, the influence of personality and motivation on job search and employment. and a review chapter on motivation in an organizational setting.

== Biography ==
Ruth Kanfer is the oldest child of Frederick and Ruby Kanfer. As the child of an academic, she lived in a number of places throughout her childhood. She earned her Bachelor of Arts degree in Psychology from Miami University of Ohio in 1976. Under the direction of Antonette Zeiss, Ruth completed her thesis in 1981 on the topic of self-efficacy and depression. After graduating, Ruth decided to pursue an academic career in Work Psychology, and took a NIH post-doc in Quantitative Psychology and retooled with Chuck Hulin at the University of Illinois from 1981 to 1984. She took her first position at the University of Minnesota. During her 14 years at Minnesota, she collaborated with Phillip Ackerman on a resource allocation theory of motivation and abilities and co-developed an air traffic controller simulation to test basic tenets of the theory. She was promoted to Professor in 1991. In 1997, she moved to the Georgia Institute of Technology.

== Professional Affiliations ==
Ruth Kanfer has been on the editorial boards of the following journals: Work, Aging, and Retirement (2016 - ), European Journal of Work and Organizational Psychology (2013 - ), Journal of Occupational and Organizational Psychology (2004 - ), Human Performance (1997 - ), Applied Psychology: An International Review, Journal of Applied Psychology, Journal of Management, Organizational Behavior and Human Decision Processes, and Basic and Applied Social Psychology. She has also been the Chair of the Academy of Management Organizational Behavior Division (1997 - 2001) and on the Board of Governors for the Academy of Management (2004–2007). She has also been a member of the Sloan Research Network on Aging & Work Steering committee, the Scientific Advisory Board of the Jacobs Center for Lifelong Learning (Bremen University, Germany), and is the founding Director of the Work Science Center at the Georgia Institute of Technology.

== Awards ==
Distinguished Scientific Contributions Award, Society for Industrial and Organizational Psychology

William R. Owens Scholarly Achievement Award (with Phillip Ackerman), Society for Industrial and Organizational Psychology

Distinguished Scientific Award for an Early Career Contribution to Psychology (in Applied Research), American Psychological Association

Elected Fellow: Academy of Management, American Psychological Association, Association for Psychological Sciences, Society for Industrial and Organizational Psychology

== Influential Publications ==
The following publications each have over 1,000 citations according to Google Scholar.

- Kanfer, R., & Ackerman, P. L. (1989). Motivation and cognitive abilities: An integrative/aptitude-treatment interaction approach to skill acquisition. Journal of Applied Psychology, 74(4), 657–690.
- Kanfer, R. (1990). Motivation theory and industrial and organizational psychology. In M. D. Dunnette & L. M. Hough (Eds.), Handbook of industrial and organizational psychology (p. 75–170). Consulting Psychologists Press
- Kanfer, R., & Ackerman, P. L. (2004). Aging, adult development, and work motivation. The Academy of Management Review, 29(3), 440–458.
- Kanfer, R., Wanberg, C. R., & Kantrowitz, T. M. (2001). Job search and employment: A personality–motivational analysis and meta-analytic review. Journal of Applied Psychology, 86(5), 837–855.
- Ageless Talent: Maximizing Talent in an Age-Diverse Workforce. L. Finkelstein, L., D. Truxillo, F. Fraccaroli, & R. Kanfer. (2021). NY: Psychology Press.

== Published books ==
The following are books that have been written and edited by Ruth Kanfer:

- Facing the Challenges of a Multi-Age Workforce: A Use-Inspired Approach - Finkelstein, L., Truxillo, D., Fraccaroli, F., & Kanfer, R. (Eds.), (2015). Facing the Challenges of a Multi-Age Workforce. A Use-Inspired Approach. NY: Psychology Press
- Work Motivation: Past, Present and Future - Kanfer, R., Chan G., & Pritchard, R.D. (Eds.). (2008)Work motivation: Past, present, and future. New York, NY: Routledge.
- Emotions in the Workplace: Understanding the Structure and Role of Emotions in Organizational Behavior - Lord, R.G.; Klimoski, R.J.; and Kanfer, R. (Eds.). (2002). Emotions in the workplace: Understanding the structure and role of emotions in organizational behavior. San Francisco, CA: Jossey-Bass.
- Abilities, Motivation and Methodology: The Minnesota Symposium on Learning and Individual Differences - Kanfer, R., Ackerman, P.L., & Cudeck, R. (Eds.). (1989). Abilities, motivation and methodology: The Minnesota symposium on learning and individual differences. New York, NY: Routledge.
