= Arnold Bakker =

Dutch psychologist

- Born: July 19, 1964 (age 61); Genemuiden, Netherlands
- Citizenship: Dutch
- Scientific career
- Fields: Psychology
- Institutions: Erasmus University Rotterdam

Arnoldus Bastiaan Bakker (born July 19, 1964) is a Dutch industrial and organizational psychologist and Professor of Work and Organizational Psychology at Erasmus University Rotterdam.

Bakker is also a fellow of the Association for Psychological Science, the secretary general of the Alliance for Organizational Psychology, and the former president of the European Association of Work and Organizational Psychology.

Bakker is a highly cited author, and the most cited author in several leading psychology journals such as Journal of Vocational Behavior, Journal of School Psychology, Journal of Organizational Behavior, Human Resource Management, Journal of Managerial Psychology, Journal of Occupational and Organizational Psychology, European Journal of Work and Organizational Psychology, Career Development International, Journal of Occupational Health Psychology, International Journal of Stress Management.
