= Hexamethyl Dewar benzene =

Names
- IUPAC name 1,2,3,4,5,6-Hexamethylbicyclo[2.2.0]hexa-2,5-diene

Identifiers
| CAS Number | 7641-77-2 |
| 3D model (JSmol) | Interactive image |
| ChemSpider | 22698 |
| EC Number | 231-576-3 |
| PubChem CID | 24278 |
| CompTox Dashboard (EPA) | DTXSID50227240 |
- InChI: InChI=1S/C12H18/c1-7-8(2)12(6)10(4)9(3)11(7,12)5/h1-6H3 Key: RVNQQZMIWZPGNA-UHFFFAOYSA-N
- SMILES: CC1=C(C2(C1(C(=C2C)C)C)C)C

Properties
| Chemical formula | C_{12}H_{18} |
| Molar mass | 162.276 g·mol^{−1} |

Related compounds
| Related compounds | Hexamethylbenzene |
- Except where otherwise noted, data are given for materials in their standard state (at 25 °C [77 °F], 100 kPa). Infobox references

Hexamethyl Dewar benzene is a derivative of Dewar benzene with application in organometallic chemistry. It consists of the Dewar benzene core, with a methyl group substituent on each of its six carbon positions.

== Synthesis ==
Hexamethyl Dewar benzene has been prepared by bicyclotrimerization of dimethylacetylene with aluminium chloride.

== Rearrangement to cyclopentadienes ==
Hexamethyl Dewar benzene undergoes a rearrangement reaction with hydrohalic acids to give a cyclopentadiene structure. A rhodium or iridium salt in methanol can be added to it to form the organometallic pentamethylcyclopentadienyl rhodium dichloride and pentamethylcyclopentadienyl iridium dichloride dimers; Consequently, it can be used as a starting material for synthesising some pentamethylcyclopentadienyl organometallic compounds including [Cp*Rh(CO)_{2}]. The hydrogen halide reaction need not be performed as a separate preliminary step, but can be triggered as a side effect of the dissolved metal-halide salt reacting with hexamethyl Dewar benzene.

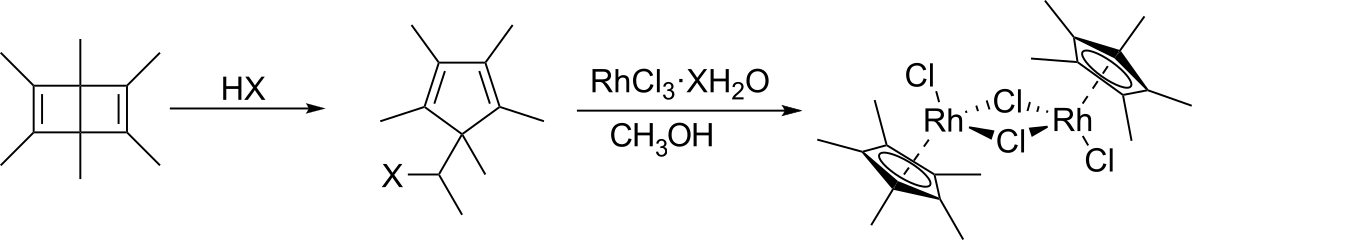

Attempting a similar reaction with potassium tetrachloroplatinate results in the formation of a pentamethylcyclopentadiene complex, [(η^{4}-Cp*H)PtCl_{2}], indicating that the rhodium and iridium metal centres are necessary for the step in which the aromatic anion is formed.

== Epoxidation ==
One of the alkenes can be epoxidized using mCPBA, peroxybenzoic acid, or dimethyldioxirane (DMDO). By varying the amount of DMDO, either the mono- or diepoxide can be formed, with the oxygen atoms exo on the bicyclic carbon framework.

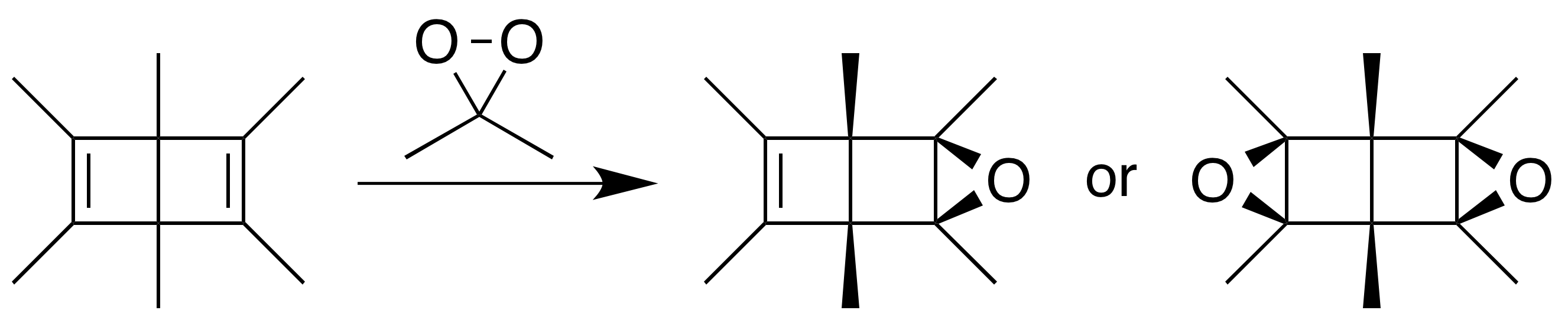

The epoxide products are stable when the oxidation is performed under neutral conditions, such as when using DMDO that has acetone as a byproduct. When Using a peracid (mCPBA or peroxybenzoic acid), the epoxy product quickly rearranges, catalyzed by the acid byproduct of the epoxidation.

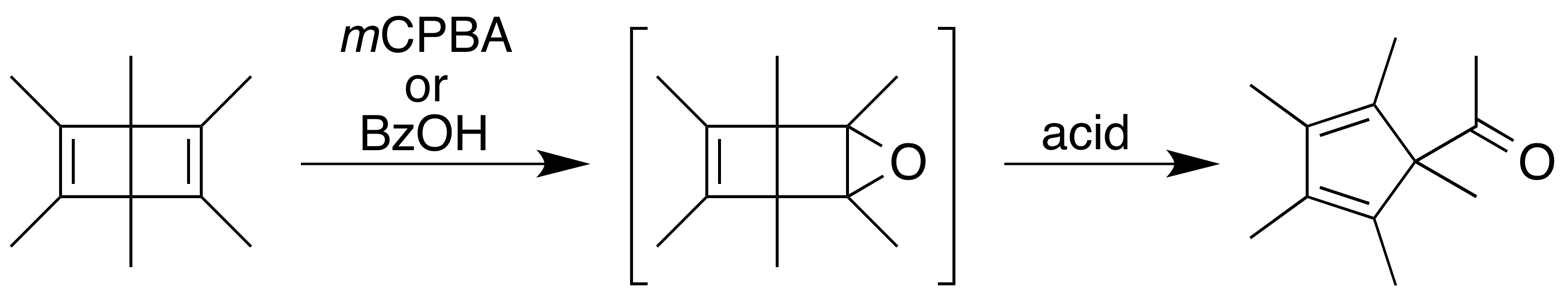

== Dication ==
In 1973, the dication of hexamethylbenzene, C_{6}(CH_{3})^{2+}_{6}, was produced by Hepke Hogeveen and Peter Kwant. This can be done by dissolving the hexamethyl Dewar benzene monoepoxide in magic acid, which removes the oxygen as an anion. NMR had previously hinted at a pentagonal pyramidal structure in a related cation as had spectral data on the Hogeveen and Kwant dication. The pyramidal structure having an apex carbon bonding to six other carbon atoms was confirmed by X-ray crystallographic analysis of the hexafluoroantimonate salt published in 2016.

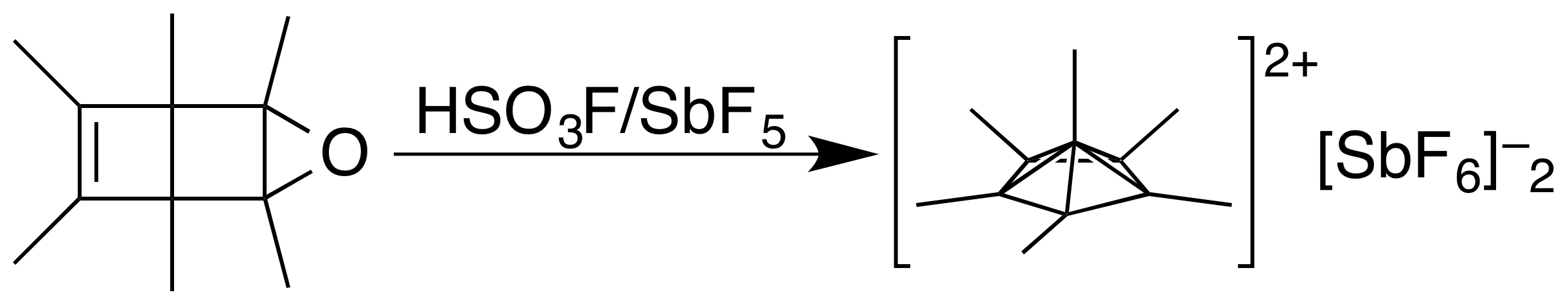

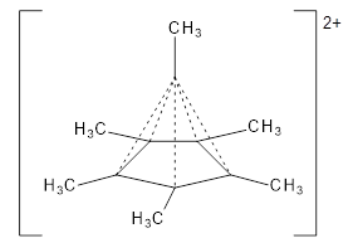
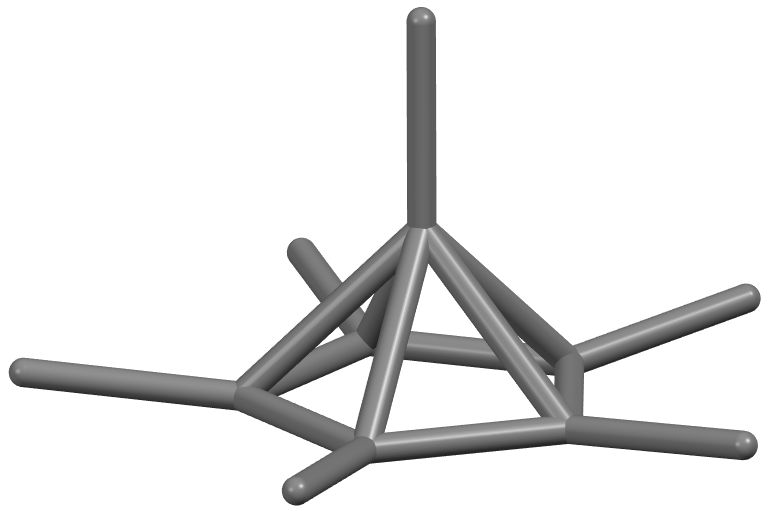
Left: Structure of C_{6}(CH_{3})^{2+}_{6}, as drawn by Steven Bachrach
Right: Three-dimensional representation of the dication's rearranged pentagonal-pyramid framework, from the crystal structure

Computational organic chemist Steven Bachrach discussed the dication, noting that the weak bonds forming the upright edges of the pyramid, shown as dashed lines in the structure he drew, have a Wiberg bond order of about 0.54; it follows that the total bond order for the apical carbon is 5 × 0.54 + 1 = 3.7 < 4, and thus the species is not hypervalent, but it is hypercoordinate. From the perspective of organometallic chemistry, the species can be viewed as having a carbon(IV) centre (C^{4+}) bound to an aromatic η^{5}–pentamethylcyclopentadienyl anion (six-electron donor) and a methyl anion (two-electron donor), thereby satisfying the octet rule and being analogous to the gas-phase organozinc monomer [(η^{5}–C_{5}(CH_{3})_{5})Zn(CH_{3})], which has the same ligands bound to a zinc(II) centre (Zn^{2+}) and satisfies the 18 electron rule on the metal. Thus, while unprecedented, and having attracted comment in Chemical & Engineering News, New Scientist, Science News, and ZME Science, the structure is consistent with the usual bonding rules of chemistry. Moritz Malischewski, who carried out the work with Konrad Seppelt, commented that one the motivations for undertaking the work was to illustrate "the possibility to astonish chemists about what can be possible."
