= Maitlis =

Maitlis is a surname. Notable people with the surname include:

- Emily Maitlis (born 1970), BBC journalist and newsreader
- Peter Maitlis (1933–2022), British chemist
- Sally Maitlis (born 1965), British psychologist and academic
