= Helena Cooper-Thomas =

New Zealand academic

Helena D. Cooper-Thomas
- Born: 1970 (age 55–56)
- Education: Goldsmith College, University of London
- Scientific career
- Fields: organisational behaviour
- Patrons: University of Auckland, Auckland University of Technology
- Thesis: Influences on newcomers' adjustment tactic use

Helena D. Cooper-Thomas (born 1970) is a New Zealand organisational behaviour academic. She is currently a full professor at the Auckland University of Technology.

== Academic career ==
After a Masters at the University of Saskatchewan, she completed a PhD at Goldsmith College, University of London and then worked in industry for Shell. She rejoined academia at the University of Auckland before moving to Auckland University of Technology.

Her work on topics such as work hours, workplace bullying and burnout is covered regularly in the New Zealand media.

== Selected works ==
- Chen, Gilad, Robert E. Ployhart, Helena Cooper-Thomas, Neil Anderson, and Paul D. Bliese. "The power of momentum: A new model of dynamic relationships between job satisfaction change and turnover intentions." Academy of Management Journal 54, no. 1 (2011): 159–181.
- Cooper-Thomas, Helena D, and Neil Anderson. "Changes in newcomers' psychological contracts during organizational socialization: A study of recruits entering the British Army." Journal of Organizational Behavior (1998): 745–767.
- Cooper‐Thomas, Helena, and Neil Anderson. "Newcomer adjustment: The relationship between organizational socialization tactics, information acquisition and attitudes." Journal of Occupational and Organizational Psychology 75, no. 4 (2002): 423–437.
- Cooper-Thomas, Helena D., and Neil Anderson. "Organizational socialization: A new theoretical model and recommendations for future research and HRM practices in organizations." Journal of Managerial Psychology 21, no. 5 (2006): 492–516.
- Cooper-Thomas, Helena D., Annelies Van Vianen, and Neil Anderson. "Changes in person–organization fit: The impact of socialization tactics on perceived and actual P–O fit." European Journal of Work and Organizational Psychology 13, no. 1 (2004): 52–78.
