= Gudela Grote =

German Psychologist and academic

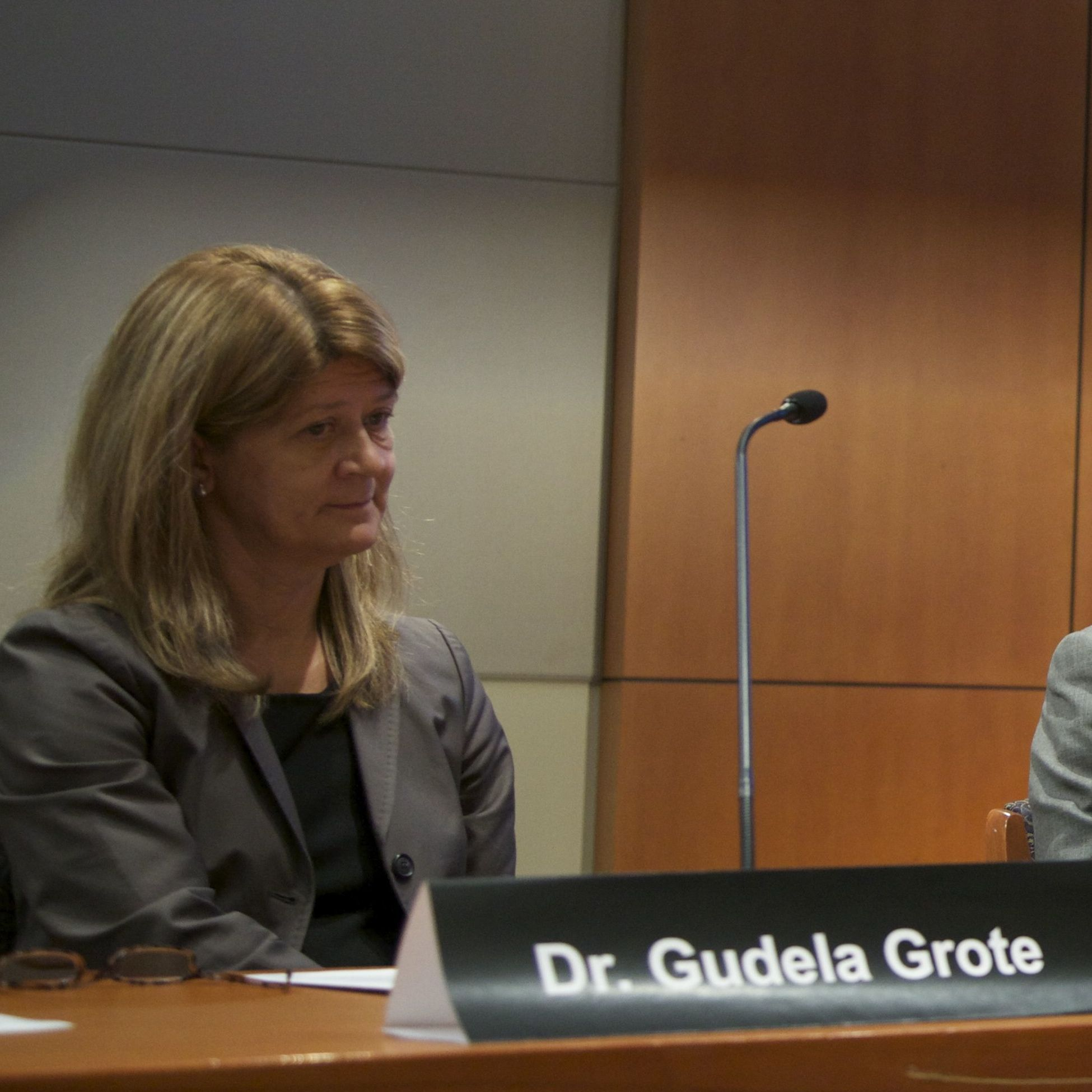
- Grote in 2013
- Born: 4 December 1960 (age 65); Wiesbaden, Hesse, Germany
- Education: University of Marburg; Technische Universität Berlin; Georgia Institute of Technology
- Occupations: Psychologist and academic

Gudela Grote (born 4 December 1960) is a German psychologist and academic. She was educated in Germany and the United States, and established her career in Switzerland.

== Early life ==
Born in Wiesbaden, Hesse, Germany, Grote studied psychology at the University of Marburg and Technische Universität Berlin, and received her doctorate from the Georgia Institute of Technology in Atlanta in 1987 with a dissertation on the situational specificity and consistency of achievement motivation. She continued her research at the Swiss Federal Institute of Technology in Zurich in 1988 and has held visiting positions at the University of Sheffield, Birkbeck University of London, Boston University, NASA Ames, University of Western Australia, and MIT.

== Career ==
Grote was appointed Assistant Professor at the ETH Zurich in 1992 and Associate Professor in 1997. Since 2000, she has been a full Professor for Work and Organizational Psychology at the Department of Management, Technology and Economics.

Grote is Associate Editor of the journal Safety Science as well as a member of the editorial board of several other journals. The topics she has widely published include organizational behavior, human factors, human resource management, and safety management. Her professional experience extends to engagements at the Swiss Railways, Swiss Re and public organizations, in particular the regulatory agencies.

=== Committees ===
- President of the European Association of Work and Organizational Psychology
- Fellow of the Society for Industrial and Organizational Psychology
- Member of the Swiss National Science Foundation Research Council
- Member of the Scientific Advisory Board of the German Federal Institute for Occupational Safety and Health
- Co-author (with Prof. Dr. Bruno Staffelbach from the University of Lucerne) for the biennial "Schweizer HR-Barometer", a representative survey of the working situation and employment relationship of employees in Switzerland
- Member of the Center for Research in Sports Administration of the University of Zurich

== Publications (selection) ==
- Griffin, M. A., & Grote, G. (2020). When is more uncertainty better? A model of uncertainty regulation and effectiveness. Academy of Management Review.
- Grote, G. (2020). Safety and autonomy: A contradiction forever? Safety Science.
- Parker, S. K., & Grote. G. (2020). Automation, Algorithms, and Beyond: Why Work Design Matters More Than Ever in a Digital World. Applied Psychology: An International Review
- Pasarakonda, S., Grote, G., Schmutz, J. B., Bogdanovic, J., Guggenheim, M., & Manser, T. (2020). A Strategic Core Role Perspective on Team Coordination: Benefits of Centralized Leadership for Managing Task Complexity in the Operating Room. Human Factors.
- Pfrombeck, J., Doden, W., Grote, G., & Feierabend, A. (2020). A study of organizational cynicism and how it is affected by social exchange relationships at work. Journal of Occupational and Organizational Psychology.
- Grote, G., Wäfler, A., Ryser, C., Weik, S., Zölch, M., & Windischer, A. (2019). Wie sich Mensch und Technik sinnvoll ergänzen – Die Analyse automatisierter Produktionssysteme mit Kompass, vdf Hochschulverlag, ISBN 978-3-7281-2387-9
- Grote, G. (2014) Die Bedeutung der Berufsrolle für Frauen in stabilen Partnerschaften – Ein Vergleich von Fallstudien, Universitätsverlag TU Berlin
- Grote, G. & Raeder, S. (2012). Der psychologische Vertrag, Hogrefe, ISBN 978-3-8017-2009-4
- Grote, G. (2009) Management of Uncertainty - Theory and Application in the Design of Systems and Organizations, Springer London
- Grote, G. (1997). Autonomie und Kontrolle – Zur Gestaltung automatisierter und risikoreicher Systeme, VDF Hochschulverlag ETH
- Grote, G. & Künzler, C. (1996): Sicherheitskultur, Arbeitsorganisation und Technikeinsatz, VDF university publisher ETH
