= Roni Reiter-Palmon =

Israeli-American psychologist

- רוני רייטר-פלמון
- Born: 1964 (age 61–62); Austin, Texas, USA
- Spouse: Ophir Palmon

Academic background
- Education: BA, psychology and sociology, Tel Aviv University; MA, PhD, 1993, George Mason University

Academic work
- Institutions: University of Nebraska Omaha

Roni Reiter-Palmon (Hebrew: רוני רייטר-פלמון; born 1964) is an Israeli-American psychologist. She is a Professor and Director of the Industrial/Organizational Graduate Program at the University of Nebraska Omaha.

== Early life and education ==
Reiter-Palmo was born in 1964. She was born in Austin, Texas to psychologist parents but grew up in Tel Aviv, Israel. Reiter-Palmo completed her Bachelor's degree in psychology and sociology at Tel Aviv University before returning to the United States for her Master's degree and Ph.D. at George Mason University.

== Career ==
Upon defending her Ph.D. in 1993, Reiter-Palmo joined the faculty at the University of Nebraska Omaha (UNO) as an assistant professor of psychology. She was soon appointed the director of the Industrial-Organizational psychology graduate program at UNO. In 2005, Reiter-Palmo and her graduate students collaborated with a consulting firm to identify and analyze job duties for US Navy officers. Following this study, the UNO Institute for Collaboration Science was awarded a contract with the United States Strategic Command. Reiter-Palmo served on the leadership team of the institute as the director of research. In 2017, Reiter-Palmon was recognized with UNO's Outstanding Research and Creative Activity Award. She later became UNO's first psychology professor to be recognized as a Society for Industrial and Organizational Psychology Fellow. In 2022, Reiter-Palmon was elected president of Division 10 of the American Psychological Association. The following year, she was identified as being among the top two percent of researchers in the world in her field of social psychology.

== Personal life ==
Reiter-Palmon is married to Ophir Palmon, a professional photographer.
