= Peter Maitlis =

British chemist (1933–2022)

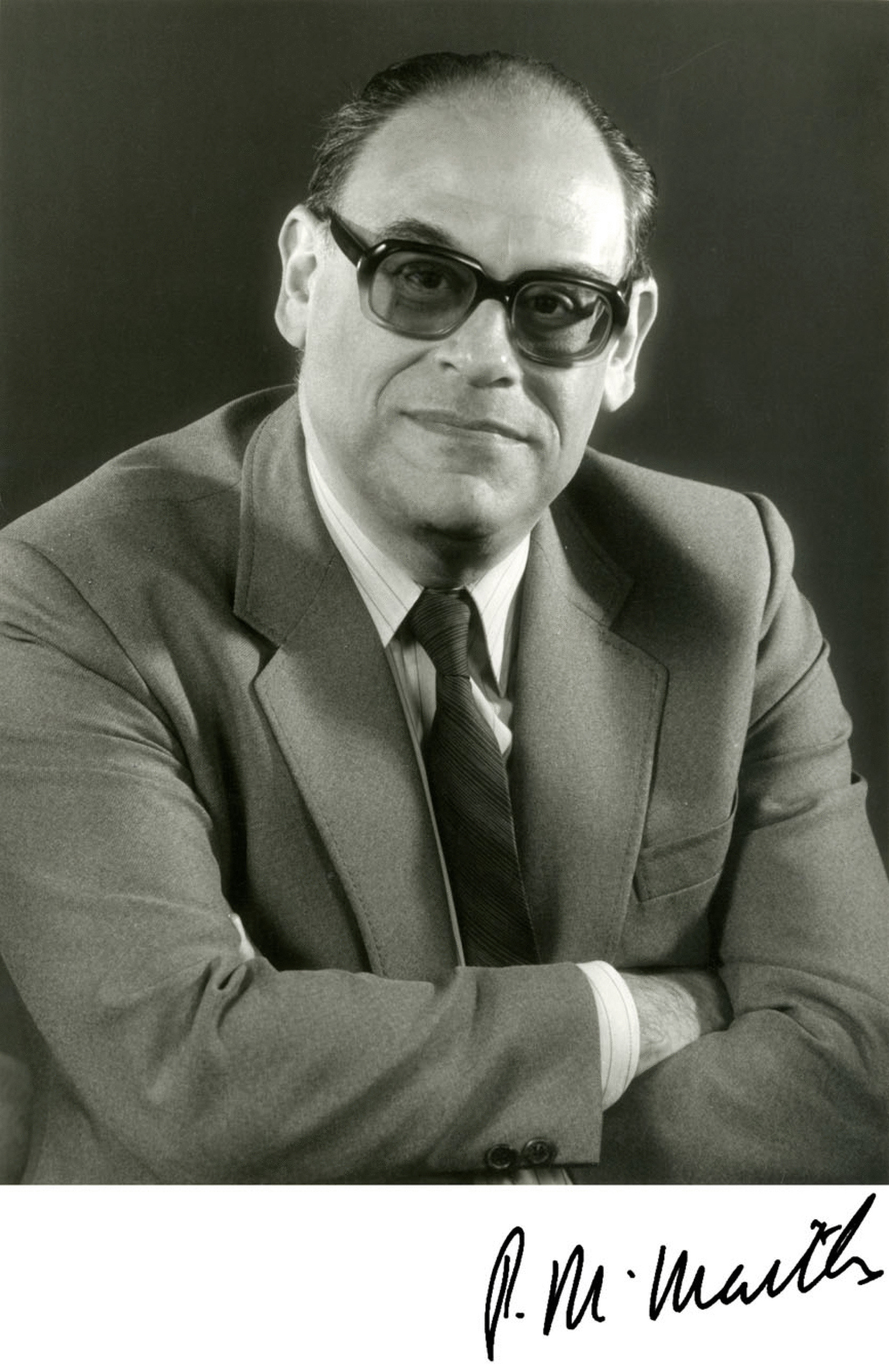

Peter Michael Maitlis, FRS (15 January 1933 – 18 May 2022) was a British organometallic chemist.

== Early life and education ==
Maitlis was born on 15 January 1933, in Berlin and educated at Hendon School (then Hendon County School) in north London 1944–50. He was awarded a Bachelor's degree in Science from the University of Birmingham, and a PhD (1956, studying under Professor Michael J. S. Dewar, who helped to develop the Dewar–Chatt–Duncanson model for bonding in organometallic compounds) and a DSc (1970) from the University of London.

== Career ==
After completing his doctorate, Maitlis worked as an assistant lecturer at the University of London. He undertook postdoctoral study at Cornell University as a Fulbright fellow (1960–1961) and then as a research fellow at Harvard University (1961–1962) under F. G. A. Stone.

While working and teaching at McMaster University in Hamilton, Ontario (1962–1972), he rose from assistant professor to a full professorship. Returning to the United Kingdom in 1972, Maitlis was a professor of chemistry at the University of Sheffield for 30 years until his appointment as an emeritus professor in 2002.

In 1971, he published two volumes on the organic chemistry of palladium which were "widely recognised as the most authoritative account of the organo-complexes of this metal".

Maitlis was elected a fellow of the Royal Society in 1984. The citation highlights his work on the platinum group metals palladium, rhodium and iridium.

=== Achievements in organometallic chemistry ===
The hexafluorophosphate ion is generally considered inert and hence a suitable counterion in organometallic synthesis. However, Maitlis' work has demonstrated a solvolysis reaction of the hexafluorophosphate ion. The tris(solvent) rhodium complex [(η^{5}-C_{5}Me_{5})Rh(Me_{2}CO)_{3}](PF_{6})_{2} undergoes solvolysis when heated in acetone, forming a difluorophosphate-bridged complex [(η^{5}-C_{5}Me_{5})Rh(μ-OPF_{2}O)_{3}Rh(η^{5}-C_{5}Me_{5})]PF_{6}.

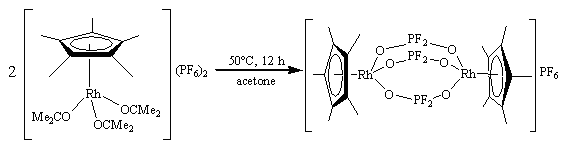

Hexamethyl Dewar benzene (C_{6}Me_{6}) undergoes an unusual rearrangement reaction with hydrohalic acids to form a pentamethylcyclopentadiene derivative, and consequently can be used as a starting material for synthesising some pentamethylcyclopentadienyl organometallic compounds.

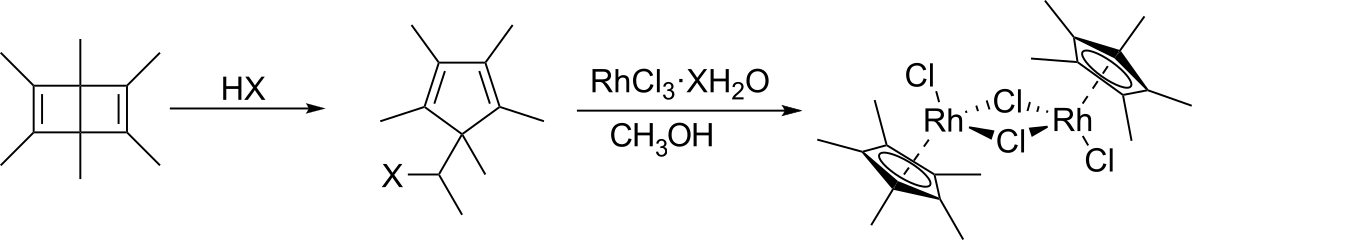
Synthesis of the rhodium(III) dimer [Cp*RhCl_{2}]_{2} from hexamethyl Dewar benzene

Maitlis and colleagues demonstrated this synthesis and its applicability to the iridium analogue, [(η^{5}-C_{5}Me_{5})IrCl_{2}]_{2}. His group also demonstrated a more convenient synthesis for the bright orange, air-stable diamagnetic iridium reagent using pentamethylcyclopentadiene.

Isocyanides can serve as ligands in co-ordination chemistry as a result of the lone electron pair on carbon, and are especially useful with metals in the 0, +1, and +2 oxidation states. In particular, Maitlis has demonstrated that tert-butyl isocyanide can stabilise metals in unusual oxidation states, such as palladium(I) in the complex [(t-BuNC)_{2}Pd(μ-Cl)]_{2}.

=== Metallomesogens ===
Metallomesogens are "metal complexes of organic ligands which exhibit liquid crystalline (mesomorphic) character [and thus they] combine the variety and range of metal-based coordination chemistry with the extraordinary physical properties exhibited by liquid crystals." They have been a research interest of Maitlis' group since the mid-1980s, and in fact Maitlis jointly directed the early investigations of these systems in the UK and actually coined the term metallomesogen.

== Personal life ==
Maitlis was Jewish. He was the father of the journalist and newsreader Emily Maitlis, and the psychologist and academic Sally Maitlis.

He died on 18 May 2022, at the age of 89.

== Most cited publications ==
The following list shows the top 10 most cited journal articles by Maitlis according to Web of Science data. The number of citations indicated is current as at 10 July 2025:

- Kang, J. W.; Moseley, K.; Maitlis, P. M. (1969). "Pentamethylcyclopentadienylrhodium and -iridium Halides. I. Synthesis and Properties". J. Am. Chem. Soc. 91 (22): 5970–5977. Bibcode:1969JAChS..91.5970K. doi:10.1021/ja01050a008. --- 674 citations
- Giroud-Godquin, A.-M.; Maitlis, P. M. (1991). "Metallomesogens – Metal-Complexes in Organized Fluid Phases". Angew. Chem. Int. Ed. 30 (4): 375–402. doi:10.1002/anie.199103751. --- 583 citations
- Hudson, S. A.; Maitlis, P. M. (1993). "Calamitic Metallomesogens: Metal-Containing Liquid-Crystals with Rodlike Shapes". Chem. Rev. 93 (3): 861–885. doi:10.1021/cr00019a002. --- 497 citations
- Maitlis, P. M.; Haynes, A.; Sunley, G. J.; Howard, M. J. (1996). "Methanol Carbonylation Revisited: Thirty Years On". J. Chem.Soc., Dalton Trans. (11): 2187–2196. doi:10.1039/dt9960002187. --- 305 citations
- Maitlis, P. M. (1978). "(Pentamethylcyclopentadienyl)rhodium and -iridium Complexes – Approaches to New Types of Homogeneous Catalysts". Acc. Chem. Res. 11 (8): 301–307. doi:10.1021/ar50128a003. --- 274 citations
- White, C.; Thompson, S. J.; Maitlis, P. M. (1977). "Pentamethylcyclopentadienyl-Rhodium and -Iridium Complexes XII. Tris(solvent) Complexes and Complexes of η^{6}-Benzene, -Naphthalene, -Phenanthrene, -Indene, -Indole, -Fluorene and η^{5}-Indenyl and -Indolyl". J. Chem. Soc., Dalton Trans. (17): 1654–1661. doi:10.1039/DT9770001654. --- 253 citations
- Haynes, A.; Maitlis, P. M.; Morris, G. E.; Sunley, G. J.; Adams, H.; Badger, P. W.; Bowers, C. M.; Cook, D. B.; Elliott, P. I. P.; Ghaffar, T.; Green, H.; Griffin, T. R.; Payne, M.; Pearson, J. M.; Taylor, M. J.; Vickers, P. W.; Watt, R. J. (2004). "Promotion of Iridium-Catalyzed Methanol Carbonylation: Mechanistic Studies of the Cativa Process". J. Am. Chem. Soc. 126 (9): 2847–2861. Bibcode:2004JAChS.126.2847H. doi:10.1021/ja039464y. PMID 14995202. --- 249 citations
- Greaves, E. O.; Lock, C. J. L.; Maitlis, P. M. (1968). "Metal-Acetylene Complexes II. Acetylene Complexes of Nickel, Palladium and Platinum". Can. J. Chem. 46 (24): 3879–3891. doi:10.1139/v68-641. --- 241 citations
- Maitlis, P. M. (1976). "The Palladium(II)-Induced Oligomerization of Acetylenes: An Organometallic Detective Story". Acc. Chem. Res. 9 (3): 93–99. doi:10.1021/ar50099a003. --- 231 citations
- Maitlis, P. M. (1981). "Eta-5-Cyclopentadienyl and eta-6-Arene as Protecting Ligands Towards Platinum-Metal Complexes". Chem. Soc. Rev. 10 (1): 1–48. doi:10.1039/cs9811000001. --- 213 citations
