= Richard N. Landers =

American psychologist

- Occupations: Industrial and organizational psychologist, author, and academic

Academic background
- Education: B.A., Psychology; PhD, Industrial and organizational psychology
- Alma mater: University of Tennessee; University of Minnesota

Academic work
- Institutions: University of Minnesota

Richard N. Landers is an industrial and organizational psychologist, author, and academic. He is the John P. Campbell Distinguished Professor of Industrial and Organizational Psychology at the University of Minnesota and the president of the Society for Industrial and Organizational Psychology.

Landers' research examines technology-enhanced assessment, employee learning, workplace behavior, and research methodology, with a focus on artificial intelligence, games, and gamification. He is a fellow of the American Psychological Association, Association for Psychological Science, and Society for Industrial and Organizational Psychology (SIOP). He is also the editor of Technology, Mind, and Behavior.

== Education ==
Landers earned a BA in Psychology from the University of Tennessee in 2004. In 2009, he received his PhD in Industrial and Organizational Psychology from the University of Minnesota.

== Career ==
Landers began his academic career at Old Dominion University, initially as an assistant professor of psychology in 2009, and was later appointed associate professor from 2015 to 2018. In 2018, he joined the University of Minnesota as an associate professor and was later promoted to John P. Campbell Distinguished Professor of Industrial and Organizational Psychology in 2022.

Landers was elected to the presidency of the Society for Industrial and Organizational Psychology in 2025. He is also the editor of the American Psychological Association's journal Technology, Mind, and Behavior.

== Research ==
Landers' research has examined how technological innovations, including artificial intelligence, social media, and gamified tools, influence employee behavior and organizational practices. He introduced a theory of gamification, defining it as the application of game-based motivational principles to learning and work contexts and emphasized the role of technology design choices in shaping user engagement. His work has also shown that immersive features in technology-based assessments can increase engagement, while control features tend to have less impact.

Landers' research also includes studies on artificial intelligence in the workplace, including decision automation and augmentation, the auditing of bias and fairness in AI algorithms, and common misconceptions about generative artificial intelligence, which he characterizes as predictive systems rather than forms of cognition.

In his book, A Step-by-Step Introduction to Statistics for Business, Landers introduced statistical methods for business students with an emphasis on practical decision-making using Microsoft Excel and SPSS. In Reference and Research Book News, the book was described as "clear" and "succinct." He also authored Research Methods for Industrial and Organizational Psychology: Science and Practice, which examined how research methods are developed, applied, and evaluated within the field. Furthermore, he has explored the effects of digital technologies on recruitment, selection, and employee behavior in his books Social Media in Employee Selection and Recruitment: Theory, Practice and Current Challenges and The Cambridge Handbook of Technology and Employee Behavior.

Landers' work on gamification for learning has suggested that it is best designed to influence specific learner behaviors or attitudes, with learning as a downstream outcome. He has emphasized the importance of aligning design features with user preferences to support engagement and effectiveness. In gamified employee selection, he has distinguished between approaches that add game elements to existing systems and those that use complete games as assessment tools. He has proposed a conceptual framework differentiating assessment gamification, gameful design, and game-based assessment, clarifying how game elements can be systematically integrated into assessment systems. According to ScholarGPS, he is the fifth most cited gamification scholar globally.

== Media coverage ==
Landers' research and insights on the gamification of government, education, work, and human behavior have been featured by outlets such as the Business Insider, and New Scientist. His work on workplace practices and employee-related data has also been covered by Engadget and Forbes.

== Awards and honors ==
- 2020 – Fellow, Association for Psychological Science
- 2020 – Fellow, Society for Industrial and Organizational Psychology
- 2021 – Fellow, American Psychological Association
- 2022 – Innovations in Assessment Award, International Personnel Assessment Council

== Bibliography ==
=== Books ===
- Landers, Richard N. (2013). A Step-by-Step Introduction to Statistics for Business (1st ed.). Sage Publications. ISBN 9781446280850.
- Landers, Richard N.; Schmidt, Gordon B. (2016). Social Media in Employee Selection and Recruitment: Theory, Practice and Current Challenges (1st ed.). Springer International Publishing. ISBN 9783319299891.
- Landers, Richard N. (2019). The Cambridge Handbook of Technology and Employee Behavior. Cambridge University Press. ISBN 9781108649636.
- Landers, Richard N.; Behrend, Tara S. (2024). Research Methods for Industrial and Organizational Psychology: Science and Practice (1st ed.). Routledge. ISBN 9781315167473.

=== Selected articles ===
- Landers, Richard N.; Lounsbury, John W. (March 2006). "An investigation of Big Five and narrow personality traits in relation to Internet usage". Computers in Human Behavior. 22 (2): 283–293. doi:10.1016/j.chb.2004.06.001.
- Landers, Richard N. (2015). "Developing a Theory of Gamified Learning: Linking Serious Games and Gamification of Learning". Simulation & Gaming. 45 (6). doi:10.1177/10468781145636 (inactive 16 January 2026).
- Landers, Richard N.; Behrend, Tyler S. (2015). "An inconvenient truth: Arbitrary distinctions between organizational, Mechanical Turk, and other convenience samples". Industrial and Organizational Psychology: Perspectives on Science and Practice. 8 (2): 142–164. doi:10.1017/iop.2015.13.
- Landers, Richard N.; Landers, Amy K. (2015). "An Empirical Test of the Theory of Gamified Learning: The Effect of Leaderboards on Time-on-Task and Academic Performance". Simulation & Gaming. 45 (6). doi:10.1177/1046878114563662.
- Landers, Richard N.; Bauer, Kristina N.; Callan, Rachel C. (2017). "Gamification of task performance with leaderboards: A goal setting experiment". Computers in Human Behavior. 71: 508–515. doi:10.1016/j.chb.2015.08.008.
