= Susan J. Ashford =

Management scholar

- Awards: Fellow of the Academy of Management; Fellow of the Society for Industrial and Organizational Psychology

Academic background
- Education: San Jose State University; Northwestern University

Academic work
- Discipline: Management, organizational behavior
- Institutions: University of Michigan; Dartmouth College; Northwestern University; Hong Kong University of Science and Technology

Susan J. Ashford is a management scholar whose research focuses on organizational behavior, leadership, feedback seeking, self-regulation, individual proactivity, job insecurity, issue selling, and work in the gig economy. She is the Michael and Susan Jandernoa Professor of Management and Organizations at the Stephen M. Ross School of Business at the University of Michigan. Ashford is a Fellow of the Academy of Management and the Society for Industrial and Organizational Psychology.

== Education ==
Ashford received a B.A. in environmental studies, with a minor in economics, from San Jose State University in 1977. She later attended Northwestern University, where she earned an M.S. in organizational behavior in 1981 and a Ph.D. in organizational behavior in 1983, with a minor in sociology.

== Career ==
Ashford began her academic career at Northwestern University before joining the Tuck School of Business at Dartmouth College, where she served as assistant professor and later associate professor of organizational behavior from 1983 to 1991.

In 1991, Ashford joined the University of Michigan Business School as associate professor of organizational behavior. She served as interim associate dean for the PhD Program from 1994 to 1995 and was promoted to professor of organizational behavior in 1996. From 1997 to 1998, she was a visiting professor of organizational behavior at the Hong Kong University of Science and Technology. She later served as associate dean for academic affairs from 1998 to 1999 and senior associate dean for academic affairs from 1999 to 2002.

Ashford became the Michael and Susan Jandernoa Professor of Business Administration at the University of Michigan Business School in 1998. She was faculty director of the Executive MBA Program from 2002 to 2012 and associate dean for leadership development and the Executive MBA from 2007 to 2012. From 2013 to 2020, she chaired the Management and Organizations area at the Ross School of Business.

== Honors and awards ==
- Fellow, Academy of Management, 2002
- Provost's Teaching Innovation Prize, University of Michigan, 2011
- Senior Faculty Research Award, Stephen M. Ross School of Business, 2014
- Award for Scholarly Contributions to Management, Academy of Management, 2017
- Researcher of the Year, Stephen M. Ross School of Business, 2020
- Organizational Behavior Division Lifetime Achievement Award, Academy of Management, 2020
- Visionary Circle Research Grant, Society for Industrial and Organizational Psychology, 2020
- Fellow, Society for Industrial and Organizational Psychology, 2024
- Administrative Science Quarterly Award for Scholarly Contribution, 2025
- Andy Andrews Distinguished Faculty Service Award, Stephen M. Ross School of Business, 2005 and 2025
