= Pentamethylcyclopentadienyl rhodium dichloride dimer =

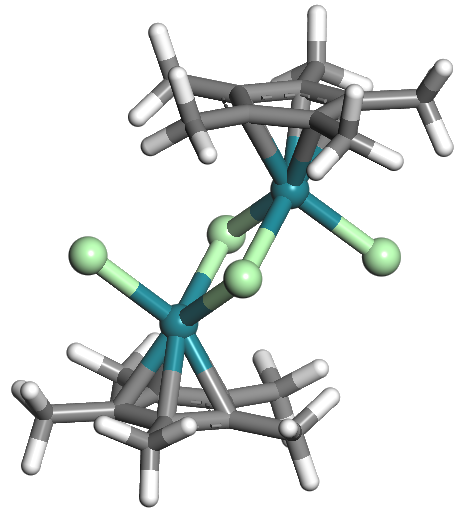
- Cp(star)RhCl2 dimer-2

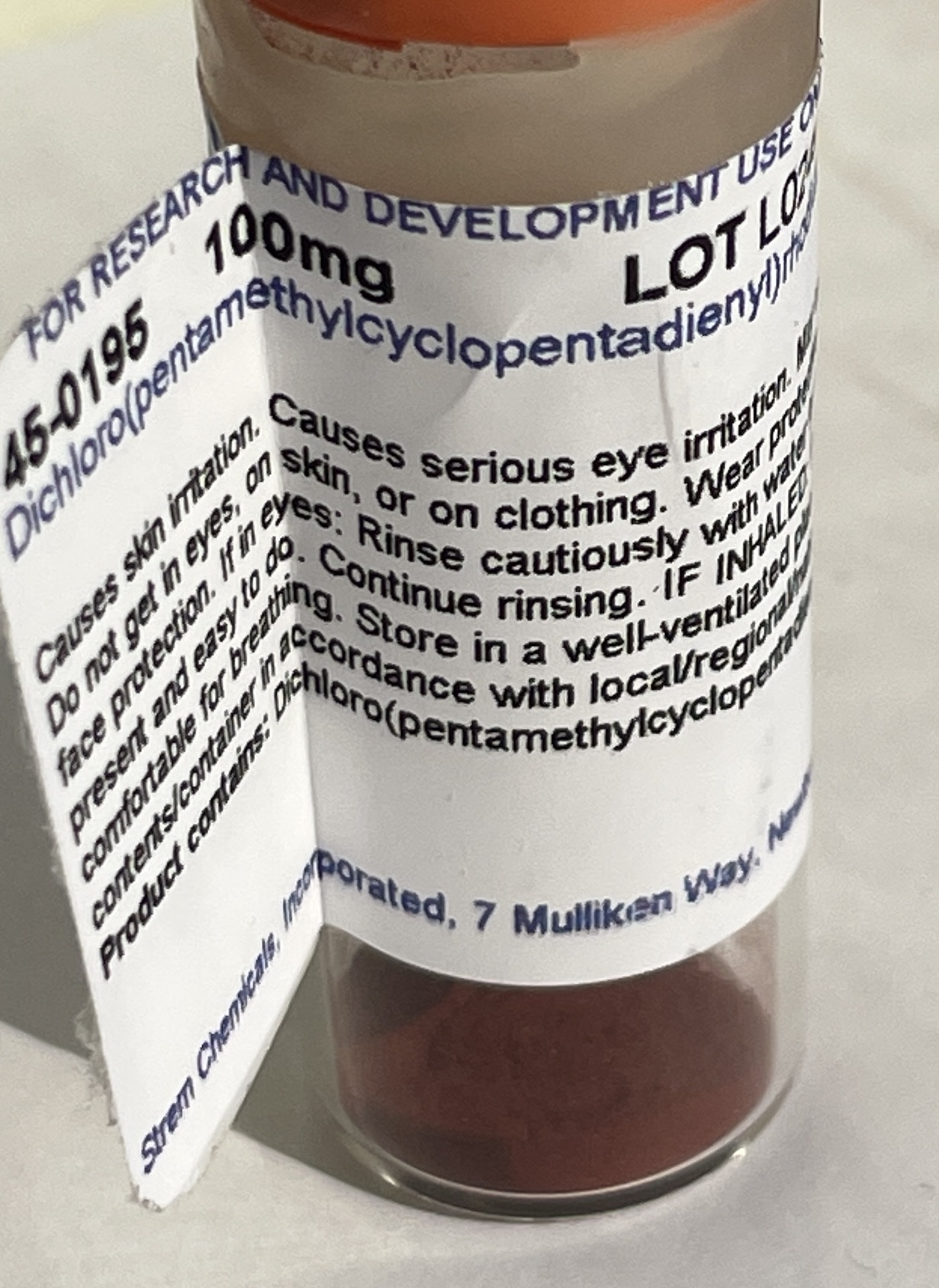
- Cp(star)RhCl2 dimer-powder

Names
- IUPAC name Di-μ-chloro-bis[chloro(pentamethylcyclopentadienyl)rhodium(III)]
- Other names Dichloro(pentamethylcyclopentadienyl)rhodium(III)

Identifiers
CAS Number	12354-85-7
3D model (JSmol)	Interactive image
ChemSpider	26583494
PubChem CID	16212157
- InChI: InChI=1S/2C10H15.4ClH.2Rh/c2*1-6-7(2)9(4)10(5)8(6)3;;;;;;/h2*1-5H3;4*1H;;/q;;;;;;2*+2/p-4 Key: QNIVKTTWBMFSBR-UHFFFAOYSA-J
- SMILES: c1(C)=c(C)c(C)=c(C)c1(C)[Rh](Cl)(Cl1)Cl[Rh](Cl)1C1(C)C(C)=C(C)C(C)=C1C

Properties
Chemical formula	C_{20}H_{30}Cl_{4}Rh_{2}
Molar mass	618.07 g·mol^{−1}
Appearance	red solid
Solubility	soluble in dichloromethane, chloroform

Hazards
- GHS labelling
Pictograms	(GHS07: Exclamation mark) (GHS08: Health hazard)
Signal word	Danger
Hazard statements	H302, H312, H315, H319, H332, H334, H335
Precautionary statements	P261, P264, P270, P271, P280, P285, P301+P312, P302+P352, P304+P312, P304+P340, P304+P341, P305+P351+P338, P312, P321, P322, P330, P332+P313, P337+P313, P342+P311, P362, P363, P403+P233, P405, P501
- Except where otherwise noted, data are given for materials in their standard state (at 25 °C [77 °F], 100 kPa). verify (what is ?) Infobox references

Pentamethylcyclopentadienyl rhodium dichloride dimer is an organometallic compound with the formula [(C_{5}(CH_{3})_{5}RhCl_{2})]_{2}, commonly abbreviated [Cp*RhCl_{2}]_{2} This dark red air-stable diamagnetic solid is a reagent in organometallic chemistry.

== Structure and preparation ==
The compound has idealized C_{2h} symmetry. Each metal centre is pseudooctahedral.

The compound is prepared by the reaction of rhodium trichloride trihydrate and pentamethylcyclopentadiene in hot methanol, from which the product precipitates:

2 C_{5}(CH_{3})_{5}H + 2 RhCl_{3}(H_{2}O)_{3} → [(C_{5}(CH_{3})_{5})RhCl_{2}]_{2} + 2 HCl + 6 H_{2}O

It was first prepared by the reaction of hydrated rhodium trichloride with hexamethyl Dewar benzene

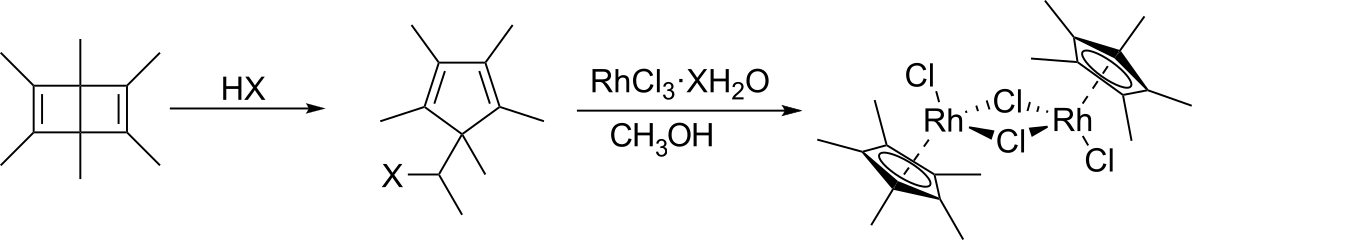
Synthesis of [Cp*RhCl_{2}]_{2} using hexamethyl Dewar benzene.

This complex was first prepared from hexamethyl Dewar benzene and RhCl_{3}(H_{2}O)_{3}. The hydrohalic acid necessary for the ring-contraction rearrangement is generated in situ in methanolic solutions of the rhodium salt, and the second step has been carried out separately, confirming this mechanistic description. The reaction occurs with the formation of 1,1-dimethoxyethane, CH_{3}CH(OCH_{3})_{2}, and hexamethylbenzene is produced by a side reaction.

This rhodium(III) dimer can be reduced with zinc in the presence of CO to produce the rhodium(I) complex [Cp*Rh(CO)_{2}].

== Reactions ==
Reductive carbonylation gives [Cp*Rh(CO)_{2}].

The Rh-μ-Cl bonds are labile and cleave en route to a variety of adducts of the general formula Cp*RhCl_{2}L. Treatment with silver ions in polar coordinating solvents causes precipitation of silver(I) chloride, leaving a solution containing dications of the form [Cp*RhL_{3}]^{2+} (L = H_{2}O, MeCN).

The chemistry is similar to that of the analog pentamethylcyclopentadienyl iridium dichloride dimer.

== Further reading (early literature) ==
- Kang, Jung W.; Mosley, K.; Maitlis, Peter M. (1968). "Mechanisms of Reactions of Dewar Hexamethylbenzene with Rhodium and Iridium Chlorides". Chem. Commun. (21): 1304–1305. doi:10.1039/C19680001304.
- Kang, Jung W.; Maitlis, Peter M. (1968). "Conversion of Dewar Hexamethylbenzene to Pentamethylcyclopentadienylrhodium(III) Chloride". J. Am. Chem. Soc. 90 (12): 3259–3261. doi:10.1021/ja01014a063.
- Criegee, Rudolf; Grüner, H. (1968). "Acid-catalyzed Rearrangements of Hexamethyl-prismane and Hexamethyl-Dewar-benzene". Angew. Chem. Int. Ed. 7 (6): 467–468. doi:10.1002/anie.196804672.
- Kang, Jung W.; Moseley, K.; Maitlis, Peter M. (1969). "Pentamethylcyclopentadienylrhodium and -iridium halides. I. Synthesis and properties". J. Am. Chem. Soc. 91 (22): 5970–5977. doi:10.1021/ja01050a008.
- Herrmann, Wolfgang A.; Zybill, Christian (1996). "Bis{(μ-chloro)[chloro(η-pentamethylcyclopentadienyl)rhodium]} — {Rh(μ-Cl)Cl[η-C_{5}(CH_{3})_{5}]}_{2}". In Herrmann, Wolfgang A.; Salzer, Albrecht (eds.). Synthetic Methods of Organometallic and Inorganic Chemistry – Volume 1: Literature, Laboratory Techniques, and Common Starting Materials. Georg Thieme Verlag. pp. 148–149. ISBN 9783131791610.
- Heck, Richard F. (1974). "Reactions of Dienes Trienes and Tetraenes with Transition Metal Compounds". Organotransition Metal Chemistry: A Mechanistic Approach. Academic Press. pp. 116–117. ISBN 9780323154703.
