= My Name is Benny =

Webcomic by Sokomin

- Author: Sokomin
- Website: My Name is Benny on Webtoon
- Current status/schedule: Completed
- Launch date: January 10, 2018
- End date: May 20, 2020
- Publisher(s): Webtoon, Graphix
- Genre(s): Slice-of-life, comedy

My Name is Benny is a comedy webcomic by Sokomin. It was published digitally on Webtoon from 2018 to 2020, with print volumes being published by Graphix starting in 2025.

== Plot ==
The series follows largely episodic comedic slice-of-life escapades starring Benny, a quirky and often childish teenage girl who constantly wears a gas mask. In many chapters, she is joined by her childhood friend Timothy and later her neighbor Isaac and classmate Fae.

== Print release ==
| Volume | Date | ISBN |
|---|---|---|
| 1 | August 5, 2025 | ISBN 978-1546174448 |
| 2 | October 20, 2026 | ISBN 978-1546174431 |

== Reception ==
Kirkus Reviews described the first print volume as "amusing but light on substance," noting how certain jokes "seem to be aimed at older readers, such as references to infomercial pitchman Billy Mays and the marshmallow test." In regards to the art, they commented on the use of "watercolorlike textures and tones and minimalist backgrounds". In a review of the second volume, they noted an increase in moments of character development with plotlines involving characters engaging in romance and preparing for graduation, concluding that the volume was a "bittersweet conclusion to a humorous and thoughtful web series."

Andrea Lipiniski of School Library Journal remarked that stories in the series were "strangely funny—or sometimes just strange."
