= Tara Behrend =

Industrial and organizational psychologist

Tara S. Behrend
- Occupations: Industrial and organizational psychologist, author, and academic

Academic background
- Education: University of Pittsburgh; North Carolina State University

Academic work
- Institutions: Michigan State University; Workplaces and Virtual Environments Lab

Tara S. Behrend is an industrial and organizational psychologist, author, and academic. She is the John Richard Butler II Endowed Professor at Michigan State University (MSU) and is the director of the MSU Future of Work Initiative. She is also a director of the Workplaces and Virtual Environments Lab (WAVE).

Behrend's research has examined workplace surveillance, artificial intelligence in selection and assessment, and workforce readiness, focusing on how emerging technologies shape employee experiences and organizational decision-making. She is a fellow and past president of the Society for Industrial and Organizational Psychology (SIOP) and a Stanford Cyber Initiative Fellow at the Center for Advanced Study in the Behavioral Sciences (CASBS).

== Education ==
In 2003, Behrend received a B.S. in Psychology from the University of Pittsburgh. Later, from North Carolina State University, she completed an M.S. and a PhD in Industrial and Organizational Psychology in 2006 and 2009, respectively.

== Career ==
Behrend began her academic career at George Washington University (GWU) in 2009 as an assistant professor and was promoted to associate professor in 2015, a position she held until 2020. From 2017 to 2020, she also worked as an affiliated faculty member and as a director at GWU. Subsequently, she joined Purdue University as an associate professor and remained there until 2023. Since then, she has been the John Richard Butler II Endowed Professor at MSU. She is the director of the MSU Future of Work Initiative and directs WAVE Lab.

Behrend worked as program director for the National Science Foundation (NSF) Science of Organizations program from 2020 to 2022 and chaired of the NSF Future of Work at the Human Technology Frontier program. Between 2023 and 2024, she was the president of SIOP. She also holds chair positions at the Board on Human-System Integration of National Academies of Sciences, Engineering, and Medicine and the Board of Scientific Affairs of American Psychological Association (APA).

== Research ==
Behrend's research in industrial-organizational (I-O) psychology has explored how technology, data, and organizational systems shape work, workers, and decision-making. Some of her work centered on the psychological effects of digital workplace surveillance and monitoring. Her studies also focused on the application of big data and artificial intelligence in human resource management to enhance data-driven organizational decision-making while addressing ethical and legal issues in employment settings. Her work also investigated ongoing auditing as a key safeguard for identifying and mitigating bias.

== Works ==
Behrend's edited book, Human‑Technology Partnerships at Work, examined how artificial intelligence, automation, and digital tools are transforming work across industries. The work was defined as a "rich material for courses on work and technology"; however, Ivanovski criticized it for its "limited attention to institutional variation". With Richard N. Landers, she published the book Research Methods for Industrial and Organizational Psychology: Science and Practice.

== Awards and honors ==
- 2016 – Stanford Cyber Initiative Fellow, CASBS
- 2020 – Fellow, SIOP
- 2024 – Futures Fellow, Stanford Center on Longevity
- 2025 – Distinguished Service Contributions Award, SIOP

== Bibliography ==
=== Books ===
- Oswald, Fred; Behrend, Tara S.; Foster, Lori (2019). Workforce Readiness and the Future of Work. Routledge. ISBN 9780815381419.
- Behrend, Tara S.; Sang, E Woo.; Louis, Tay (2023). Technology and Measurement Around the Globe. Cambridge University Press. ISBN 9781316515280.
- Landers, Richard N.; Behrend, Tara S. (2024). Research Methods for Industrial and Organizational Psychology: Science and Practice. Routledge. ISBN 9781315167473.
- Behrend, Tara S. (2025). Human-Technology Partnerships at Work. Cambridge University Press. ISBN 9781009348188.

=== Selected articles ===
- Ravid, Daniel M.; Tomczak, David L.; White, Jerod C.; Behrend, Tara S. (2020). "EPM 20/20: A Review, Framework, and Research Agenda for Electronic Performance Monitoring". Journal of Management. 46 (1): 100–126. doi:10.1177/0149206319869435.
- Ravid, Daniel M.; White, Jerod C.; Tomczak, David L.; Miles, Ahleah F.; Behrend, Tara S. (2023). "A Meta‐Analysis of the Effects of Electronic Performance Monitoring on Work Outcomes". Personnel Psychology. 76 (1): 5–40. doi:10.1111/peps.12514.
- Landers, Richard N.; Behrend, Tara S. (2023). "Auditing the AI auditors: A Framework for Evaluating Fairness and Bias in High Stakes AI Predictive Models". American Psychologist. 78 (1): 36–49. doi:10.1037/amp0000972.
- Behrend, Tara S.; Shoss, Mindy; Tracy, Meaghan; Stolle, Dennis; Blachly, Benjamin; Chan, Mark; Schwartz, Beth (2026). "Work Precarity and Workplace Surveillance Experiences". Journal of Business and Psychology. doi:10.1007/s10869-026-10105-3.
