= Organizational Psychology Review =

- Discipline: Organizational psychology
- Language: English

Publication details
- History: 2011-present
- Publisher: Sage Publishing in partnership with the European Association of Work and Organizational Psychology
- Frequency: Quarterly
- Impact factor: 7.1 (2024)
- ISO 4: Find out here

Indexing
- ISSN: 2041-3866 (print); 2041-3874 (web)
- LCCN: 2010251415
- OCLC no.: 705921982

Links
- Journal homepage; Online access; Online archive

Organizational Psychology Review is a quarterly peer-reviewed academic journal published by Sage Publishing in partnership with the European Association of Work and Organizational Psychology. It publishes meta-analyses and original conceptual work in the field of organizational psychology, understood broadly as including organizational behavior, occupational psychology, applied psychology, industrial psychology, personnel psychology, and work psychology).

== Abstracting and indexing ==
The journal is abstracted and indexed in:

- ABDC: Journal Quality List
- CABS: Academic Journal Guide (AJG)
- Clarivate Analytics: Current Contents
- Clarivate Analytics: Social Sciences Citation Index
- ProQuest databases
- PubsHub PMSolution

According to the Journal Citation Reports, the journal had a 2024 impact factor of 7.1 and a 5-year impact factor of 8.1.
