= Bulky cyclopentadienyl ligands =

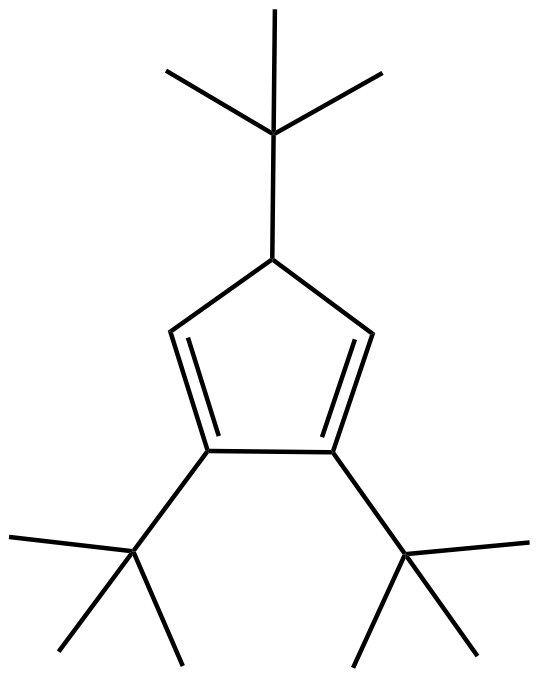
Structure of ^{t}Bu_{3}C_{5}H_{3}, a prototypical bulky cyclopentadiene.

In the area of organometallic chemistry, a bulky cyclopentadienyl ligand is jargon for a ligand of the type C_{5}H_{5−n}R^{−}_{n} where R is a branched alkyl and n = 3 or 4. Representative examples are the tetraisopropyl derivative C_{5}H^{i}Pr^{−}_{4} and the tris(tert-butyl) derivative 1,2,4-C_{5}H_{2}^{t}Bu^{−}_{3}. These ligands are so large that their complexes behave differently from the analogues derived from pentamethylcyclopentadienyl, itself a bulky ligand.

== General properties of complexes ==
Because they cannot closely approach the metal, these bulky ligands can stabilize high spin complexes, such as (C_{5}H_{2}^{t}Bu_{3})_{2}Fe_{2}I_{2}. These large ligands stabilize highly unsaturated derivatives such as (C_{5}H_{2}^{t}Bu_{3})_{2}Fe_{2}N_{2}.

== Synthesis and reactions ==
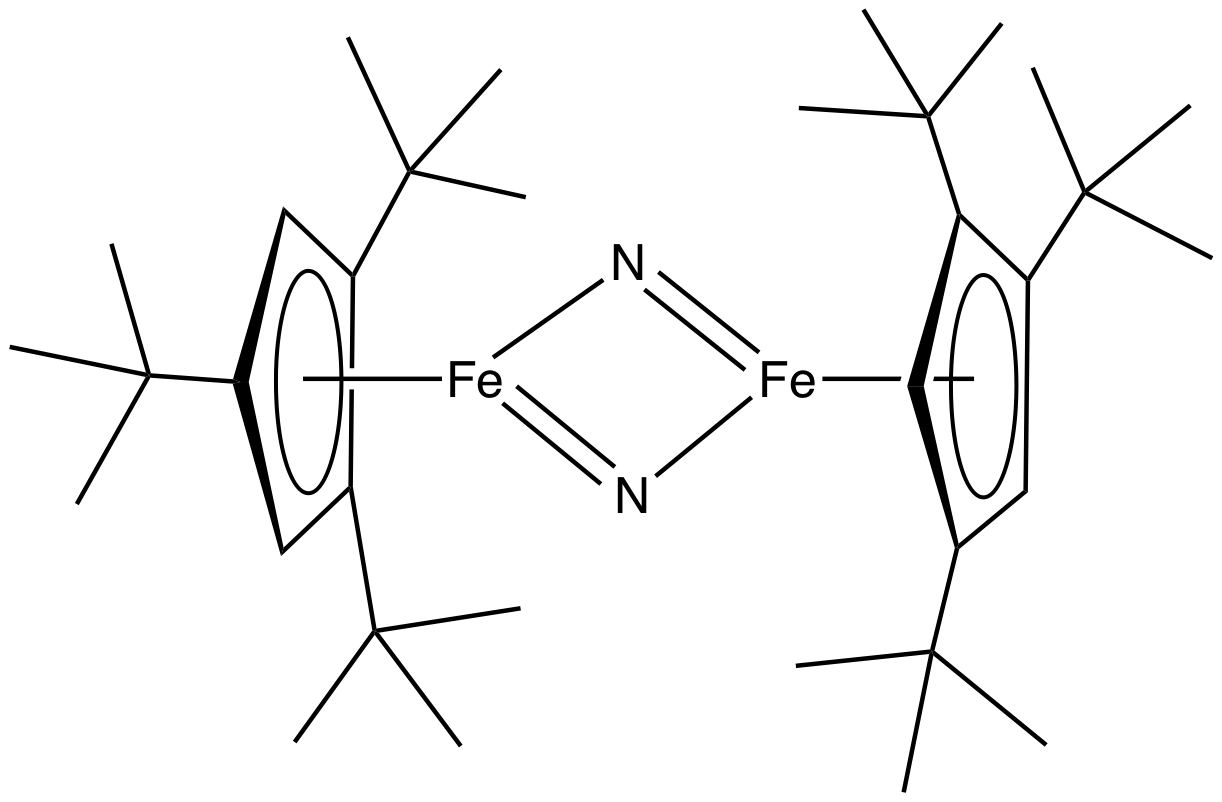
Structure of (^{t}Bu_{3}C_{5}H_{2})_{2}Fe_{2}N_{2}.

The (tert-butyl)cyclopentadiene is prepared by alkylation of cyclopentadiene with tert-butyl bromide in the presence of sodium hydride and dibenzo-18-crown-6. The intermediate in this synthesis is di-tert-butylcyclopentadiene. This compound is conveniently prepared by alkylation of cyclobutadiene with tert-butyl bromide under phase-transfer conditions.

Illustrative of the unusual complexes made possible with these bulky ligands is molecular iron nitrido complex (^{t}Bu_{3}C_{5}H_{2})_{2}Fe_{2}N_{2}. In contrast to (C_{5}Me_{5})_{2}Ir_{2}Cl_{4}, (^{t}Bu_{3}C_{5}H_{2})IrCl_{2} is monomeric.

== Related bulky ligands ==
Less bulky ligand are of the type C_{5}H_{3}R^{−}_{2} where R is a branched alkyl. Examples include the di-tert-butyl and related trimethylsilyl derivatives. One such complex is U(C_{5}H_{3}(SiMe_{3})_{2})_{3}.
