= Sally Maitlis =

British psychologist and academic (born 1965)

Sally Maitlis FBA
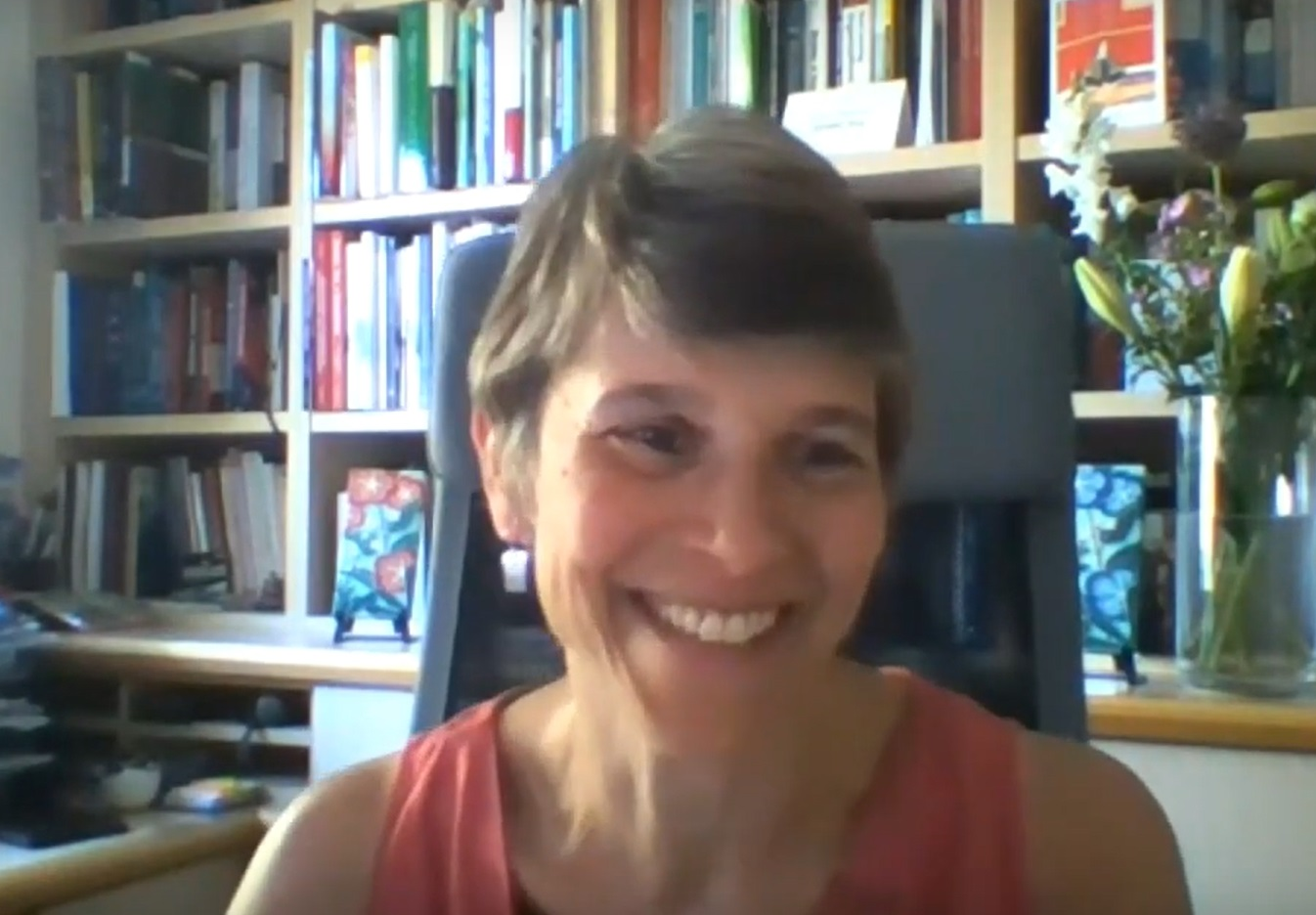
- Maitlis in 2020
- Born: 1965 (age 60–61); Hamilton, Ontario, Canada

Academic work
- Discipline: Psychologist
- Sub-discipline: Occupational psychology; organisational behaviour; sensemaking; integrative psychotherapy
- Institutions: St Mary's Hospital Medical School; University of Sheffield; Sauder School of Business, University of British Columbia; Saïd Business School, University of Oxford

Sally Maitlis, FBA (born 1965) is a British psychologist and academic, who specialises in work psychology and organisational behaviour. Since 2014, she has been Professor of Organisational Behaviour and Leadership at the Saïd Business School, University of Oxford.

== Personal life ==
Maitlis was born in 1965 in Hamilton, Ontario, Canada. Her father, Peter Maitlis, was a chemist and academic, and her mother Marion Maitlis was a linguist and psychoanalytic psychotherapist. She has two sisters including journalist Emily Maitlis, who described her as "the rebel [...] who pushed all the boundaries". She has two daughters.

== Education and career ==
Maitlis studied psychology at University College London, graduating with a Bachelor of Science degree in 1986. She then became a research assistant at St Mary's Hospital Medical School, London, before joining Saville and Holdsworth Ltd as an occupational psychologist in 1988. She joined the University of Sheffield in 1991 as a research scientist in its Social and Applied Psychology Unit. She also undertook a Doctor of Philosophy degree which Sheffield awarded her in 1998 for a doctoral thesis titled "Symphonic dances: a study of decision making in British symphony orchestras". She spent 1998 as a postdoctoral fellow at Harvard University.

In 1999, Maitlis joined the Sauder School of Business, University of British Columbia, as an assistant professor. She was promoted to associate professor in 2007 and made Professor of Organizational Behavior in 2014. Then, also in 2014, she was appointed Professor of Organisational Behaviour and Leadership at the Saïd Business School, University of Oxford.

In addition to her main academic career in work psychology, she has an interest in counselling psychology and psychotherapy. She completed a Master of Education degree in counselling psychology with the University of British Columbia in 2012, and a clinical diploma in integrative psychotherapy with the Metanoia Institute in 2021. Although initially a hobby, she has worked as an integrative psychotherapist since 2012.

== Honours ==
In 2022, Maitlis was elected Fellow of the British Academy (FBA), the United Kingdom's national academy for the humanities and social sciences. In 2023, she was given the MOC Distinguished Scholar Award by the Academy of Management.

== Selected works ==
- Maitlis, Sally (February 2005). "The Social Processes of Organizational Sensemaking". Academy of Management Journal. 48 (1): 21–49. doi:10.5465/amj.2005.15993111. ISSN 0001-4273.
- Maitlis, Sally; Lawrence, Thomas B. (February 2007). "Triggers And Enablers Of Sensegiving In Organizations". Academy of Management Journal. 50 (1): 57–84. doi:10.5465/amj.2007.24160971.
- Maitlis, Sally; Sonenshein, Scott (May 2010). "Sensemaking in Crisis and Change: Inspiration and Insights From Weick (1988)". Journal of Management Studies. 47 (3): 551–580. doi:10.1111/j.1467-6486.2010.00908.x.
- Hernes, Tor; Maitlis, Sally, eds. (2010). Process, sensemaking, and organizing. Oxford: Oxford University Press. ISBN 978-0199594566.
- Maitlis, Sally; Vogus, Timothy J.; Lawrence, Thomas B. (August 2013). "Sensemaking and emotion in organizations". Organizational Psychology Review. 3 (3): 222–247. doi:10.1177/2041386613489062.
- Maitlis, Sally; Christianson, Marlys (January 2014). "Sensemaking in Organizations: Taking Stock and Moving Forward". Academy of Management Annals. 8 (1): 57–125. doi:10.5465/19416520.2014.873177.
