= Steven Bachrach =

American researcher

Steven M. Bachrach is an organic chemist who took up the position of Dean of Science at Monmouth University in 2016. Bachrach had previously been the Dr D. R. Semmes Distinguished Professor of Chemistry at Trinity University in San Antonio, Texas. Bachrach is the author of the textbook Computational Organic Chemistry.

== Education ==
Bachrach earned a Bachelor of Science degree from the University of Illinois Urbana-Champaign and a PhD from the University of California, Berkeley.

== Career ==
Bachrach is an organic chemist specializing in computational organic chemistry and began his career at Northern Illinois University, where he earned a Professorship. He spent 17 years at Trinity University, holding positions including the Dr. D. R. Semmes Distinguished Professor of Chemistry, Chair of the Department of Chemistry, and Assistant Vice-President for Special Projects. He then took up the position of Dean of Science in 2016 at Monmouth University. Bachrach departed from Monmouth University in 2022 and currently holds the position of Dean, Artis College of Science and Technology at Radford University.

== Computational organic chemistry ==
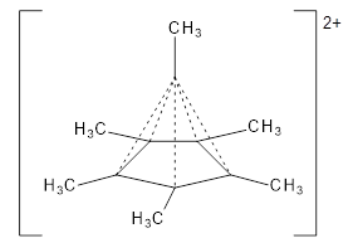
Bachrach's illustration of C_{6}(CH_{3})^{2+}_{6}, the dication of hexamethylbenzene

Bachrach has written a textbook about computational organic chemistry, the second edition of which was published by John Wiley and Sons in 2014. Bachrach maintains a blog to provide supplementary materials for the textbook. For example, following the publication of the structure of the dication of hexamethylbenzene, C_{6}(CH_{3})^{2+}_{6}, in Angewandte Chemie International Edition, Bachrach discussed its pyramidal geometry and six-coordinate carbon moiety in a blog post, demonstrating it is not hypervalent and explaining its three-dimensional aromaticity.

== See also ==
- Roman M. Balabin
