= Decamethylferrocene =

Names
- Preferred IUPAC name Decamethylferrocene
- Other names: Bis(η^{5}-pentamethylcyclopentadienyl)iron(II); Decamethyl-ferrocene; 1,1′,2,2′,3,3′,4,4′,5,5′-Decamethyl-ferrocene; Bis(pentamethylcyclopentadienyl)iron(II); Permethylferrocene

Identifiers
CAS Number	12126-50-0
3D model (JSmol)	Interactive image
ChemSpider	4321548
ECHA InfoCard	100.116.086
PubChem CID	5148079
CompTox Dashboard (EPA)	DTXSID80923743
- InChI: InChI=1S/2C10H15.Fe/c2*1-6-7(2)9(4)10(5)8(6)3;/h2*1-5H3;/q2*-1;+2 Key: SEYZDJPFVVXSRB-UHFFFAOYSA-N; InChI=1/2C10H15.Fe/c2*1-6-7(2)9(4)10(5)8(6)3;/h2*1-5H3;/q2*-1;+2 Key: SEYZDJPFVVXSRB-UHFFFAOYAP
- SMILES: C[c-]1c(c(c(c1C)C)C)C.C[c-]1c(c(c(c1C)C)C)C.[Fe+2]

Properties
Chemical formula	C_{20}H_{30}Fe
Molar mass	326.305 g·mol^{−1}
Appearance	Yellow crystalline solid
Melting point	291 to 295 °C (556 to 563 °F; 564 to 568 K)
Sublimation conditions	413 K, 5.3 Pa
- Except where otherwise noted, data are given for materials in their standard state (at 25 °C [77 °F], 100 kPa). verify (what is ?) Infobox references

Decamethylferrocene or bis(pentamethylcyclopentadienyl)iron(II) is a chemical compound with formula Fe(C_{5}(CH_{3})_{5})_{2} or C_{20}H_{30}Fe. It is a sandwich compound, whose molecule has an iron(II) cation Fe^{2+} attached by coordination bonds between two pentamethylcyclopentadienyl anions (Cp*^{−}, (CH_{3})_{5}C^{−}_{5}). It can also be viewed as a derivative of ferrocene, with a methyl group replacing each hydrogen atom of its cyclopentadienyl rings. The name and formula are often abbreviated to DmFc, Me_{10}Fc or FeCp*_{2}.

This compound is a yellow crystalline solid that is used in chemical laboratories as a weak reductant. The iron(II) core is easily oxidized to iron(III), yielding the monovalent cation decamethylferrocenium, and even to higher oxidation states.

== Preparation ==
Decamethylferrocene is prepared in the same manner as ferrocene from pentamethylcyclopentadiene. This method can be used to produce other decamethylcyclopentadienyl sandwich compounds.

2 Li(C_{5}Me_{5}) + FeCl_{2} → Fe(C_{5}Me_{5})_{2} + 2 LiCl

The product can be purified by sublimation. FeCp*_{2} has staggered Cp* rings. The average distance between iron and each carbon is approximately 2.050 Å. This structure has been confirmed by X-ray crystallography.

== Redox reactions ==
Like ferrocene, decamethylferrocene forms a stable cation because Fe(II) is easily oxidized to Fe(III). Because of the electron donating methyl groups on the Cp* groups, decamethylferrocene is more reducing than is ferrocene. In a solution of acetonitrile the reduction potential for the [FeCp*_{2}]^{+/0} couple is −0.59 V compared to a [FeCp_{2}]^{0/+} reference (−0.48 V vs Fc/Fc^{+} in CH_{2}Cl_{2}). Oxygen is reduced to hydrogen peroxide by decamethylferrocene in acidic solution.

Using powerful oxidants (e.g. SbF_{5} or AsF_{5} in SO_{2}, or XeF^{+}/Sb_{2}F^{−}_{11} in HF/SbF_{5}) decamethylferrocene is oxidized to a stable dication with an iron(IV) core. In the Sb_{2}F^{−}_{11} salt, the Cp* rings are parallel. In contrast, a tilt angle of 17° between the Cp* rings is observed in the crystal structure of the SbF^{−}_{6} salt.
