= Pentamethylcyclopentadiene =

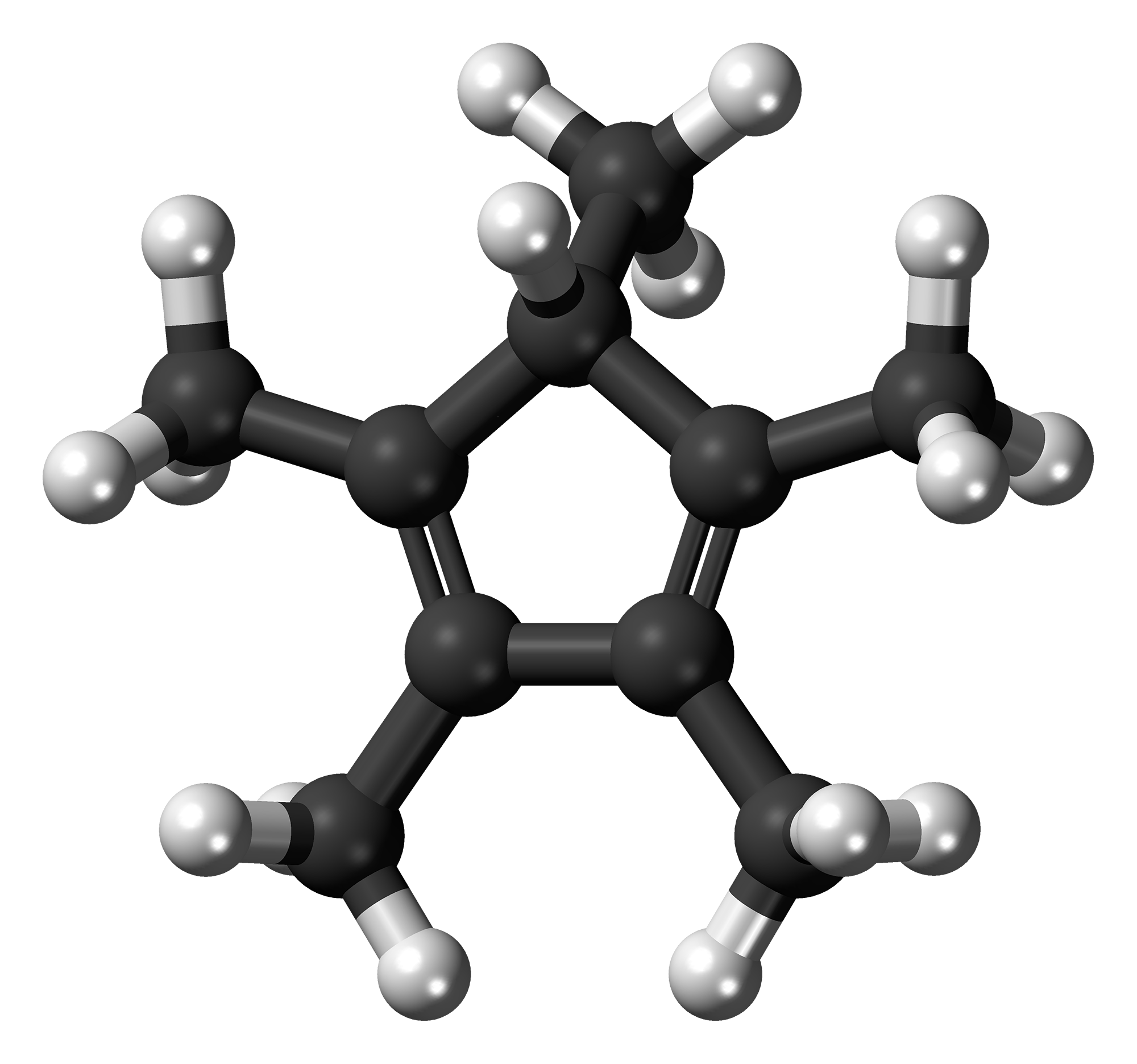

Names
- Preferred IUPAC name 1,2,3,4,5-Pentamethylcyclopenta-1,3-diene

Identifiers
CAS Number	4045-44-7
3D model (JSmol)	Interactive image
ChemSpider	70069
ECHA InfoCard	100.021.586
PubChem CID	77667
UNII	DSE3MRZ77C
CompTox Dashboard (EPA)	DTXSID00193466
- InChI: InChI=1S/C10H16/c1-6-7(2)9(4)10(5)8(6)3/h6H,1-5H3 Key: WQIQNKQYEUMPBM-UHFFFAOYSA-N; InChI=1/C10H16/c1-6-7(2)9(4)10(5)8(6)3/h6H,1-5H3 Key: WQIQNKQYEUMPBM-UHFFFAOYAI
- SMILES: CC1=C(C)C(C)C(C)=C1C

Properties
Chemical formula	C_{10}H_{16}
Molar mass	136.238 g·mol^{−1}
Appearance	Colorless liquid
Odor	Mild
Density	0.87 g/cm^{3}
Boiling point	55 to 60 °C (131 to 140 °F; 328 to 333 K) at 13 mmHg (1.7 kPa)
Solubility in water	Sparingly soluble

Hazards
- Occupational safety and health (OHS/OSH)
Main hazards	Flammable
- GHS labelling
Pictograms	(GHS02: Flammable)
Signal word	Warning
Hazard statements	H226
Flash point	114 °C (237 °F; 387 K)
- Except where otherwise noted, data are given for materials in their standard state (at 25 °C [77 °F], 100 kPa). verify (what is ?) Infobox references

1,2,3,4,5-Pentamethylcyclopentadiene is a cyclic diene with the formula C_{5}(CH_{3})_{5}H, often written C_{5}Me_{5}H, where Me is CH_{3}. It is a colorless liquid.

1,2,3,4,5-Pentamethylcyclopentadiene is the precursor to the ligand 1,2,3,4,5-pentamethylcyclopentadienyl, which is often denoted Cp* (C_{5}Me_{5}) and read as "C P star", the "star" signifying the five methyl groups radiating from the core of the ligand. Thus, the 1,2,3,4,5-pentamethylcyclopentadiene's formula is also written Cp*H. In contrast to less-substituted cyclopentadiene derivatives, Cp*H is not prone to dimerization.

== Synthesis ==
Pentamethylcyclopentadiene is commercially available. It was first prepared from tiglaldehyde and 2-butenyllithium, via 2,3,4,5-tetramethylcyclopent-2-enone, with a Nazarov cyclization reaction as a key step.

Alternatively, 2-butenyllithium adds to ethyl acetate followed by acid-catalyzed dehydrocyclization:

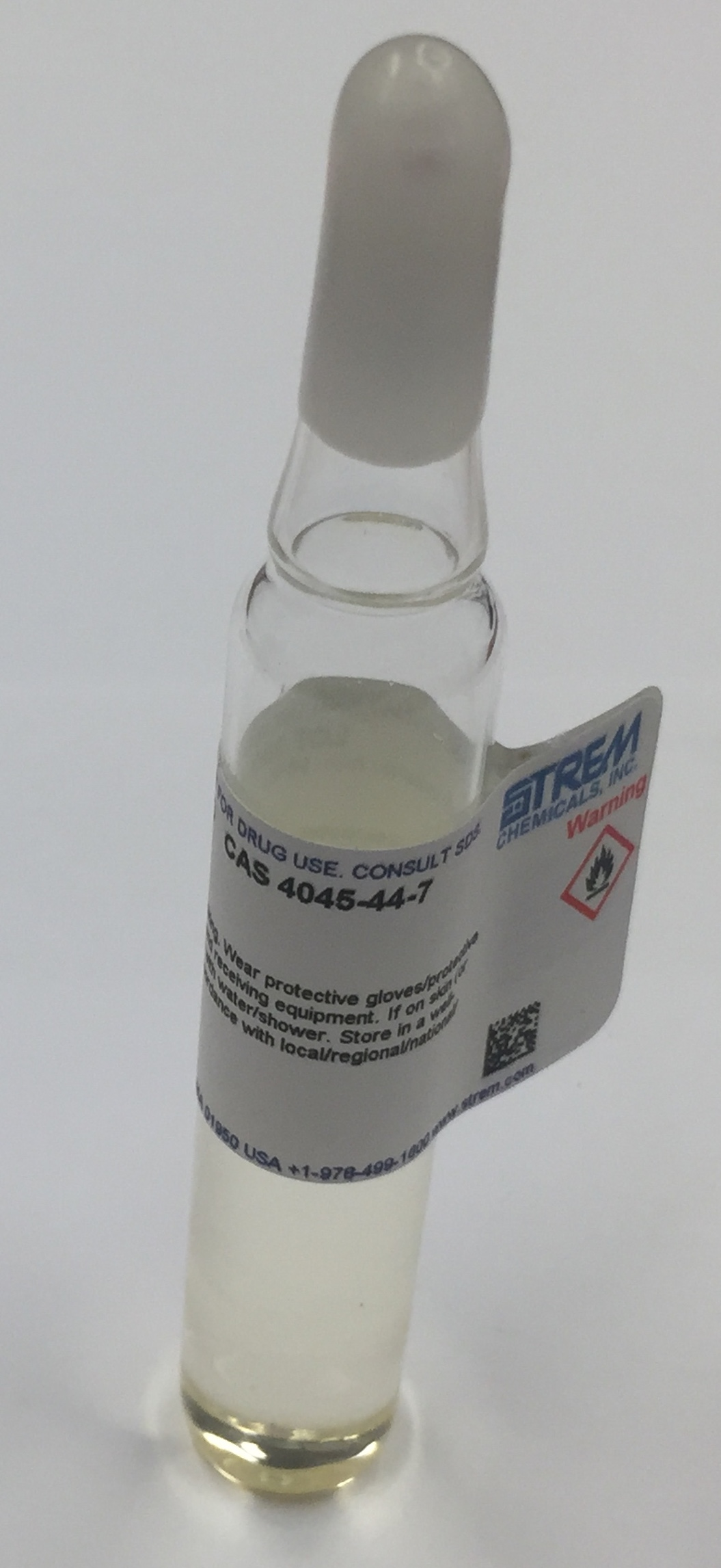

== Organometallic derivatives ==
Cp*–metal complexes
Cp*_{2}Fe	yellow
Cp*TiCl_{3}	red
[Cp*Fe(CO)_{2}]_{2}	red-violet
[Cp*RhCl_{2}]_{2}	red
[Cp*IrCl_{2}]_{2}	orange
Cp*Re(CO)_{3}>	colorless
Cp*Mo(CO)_{2}CH_{3}	orange

Cp*H is a precursor to organometallic compounds containing the C_{5}Me^{−}_{5} ligand, commonly called Cp*^{−}. Some representative reactions leading to such Cp*–metal complexes follow: Deprotonation with n-butyllithium:

Cp*H + C_{4}H_{9}Li → Cp*Li + C_{4}H_{10}

Synthesis of (pentamethylcyclopentadienyl)titanium trichloride:

Cp*Li + TiCl_{4} → Cp*TiCl_{3} + LiCl

Synthesis of (pentamethylcyclopentadienyl)iron dicarbonyl dimer from iron pentacarbonyl:

2 Cp*H + 2 Fe(CO)_{5}< → [η^{5}-Cp*Fe(CO)_{2}]_{2} + H_{2} + 6 CO

This method is analogous to the route to the related Cp complex, see cyclopentadienyliron dicarbonyl dimer.

Some Cp* complexes are prepared using silyl transfer:

Cp*Li + Me_{3}SiCl → Cp*SiMe_{3} + LiCl
Cp*SiMe_{3} + TiCl_{4} → Cp*TiCl_{3} + Me_{3}SiCl

A now-obsolete route to Cp* complexes involves the use of hexamethyl Dewar benzene. This method was traditionally used for preparation of the chloro-bridged dimers [Cp*IrCl_{2}]_{2} and [Cp*RhCl_{2}]_{2}, but has been discontinued with the increased commercial availability of Cp*H. Such syntheses rely on a hydrohalic acid induced rearrangement of hexamethyl Dewar benzene to a substituted pentamethylcyclopentadiene prior to reaction with the hydrate of either iridium(III) chloride or rhodium(III) chloride.

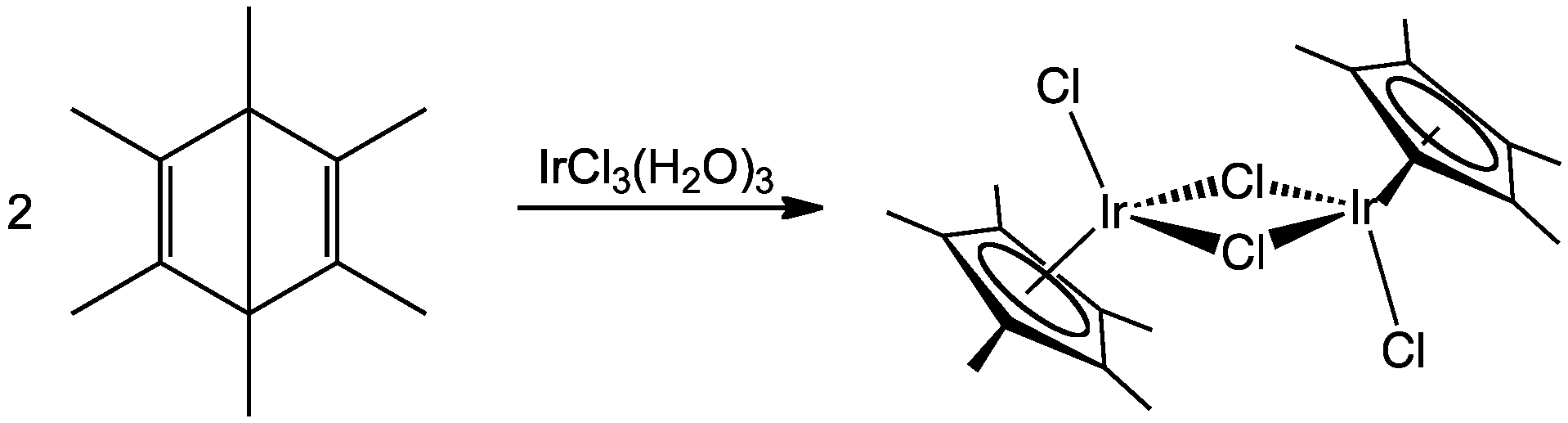
Synthesis of the iridium(III) dimer [Cp*IrCl_{2}]_{2} using hexamethyl Dewar benzene

The methyl group in Cp* complexes can undergo C–H activation leading to "tuck-in complexes".

=== Comparison to other Cp ligands ===
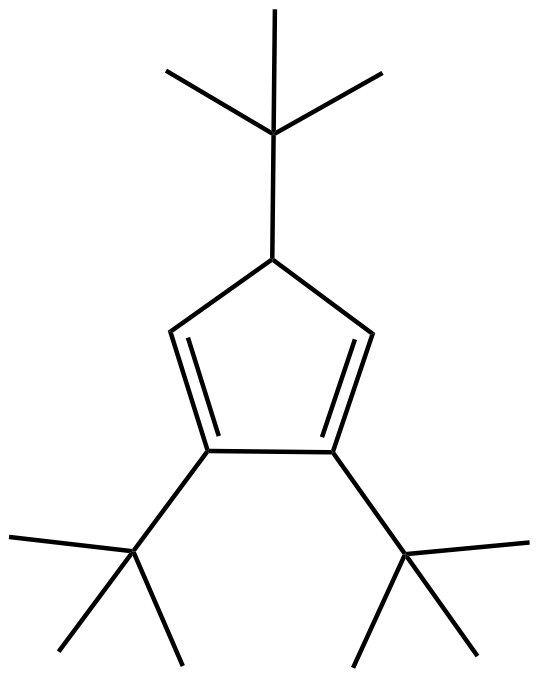
Structure of ^{t}Bu_{3}C_{5}H_{3}, a prototypical bulky cyclopentadienyl ligand

Complexes of pentamethylcyclopentadienyl differ in several ways from the more common cyclopentadienyl (Cp) derivatives. Being more electron-rich, Cp*^{−} is a stronger donor and dissociation, like ring-slippage, is more difficult with Cp* than with Cp. Its complexes tend to be more soluble in non-polar solvents.

Bulky cyclopentadienyl ligands and 1,2,3-trisubstituted Cp ligands are also known. (Trifluoromethyl)tetramethylcyclopentadienyl (C_{5}Me_{4}CF_{3}) has the steric properties of Cp* and the electronic properties of Cp.

== See also ==
- Cyclopentadiene
- Methylcyclopentadiene
