= Applied Psychology (journal) =

- Discipline: Applied psychology
- Language: English
- Edited by: Ute Stephan

Publication details
- History: 2002–present
- Publisher: Wiley-Blackwell
- Frequency: Quarterly
- Impact factor: 3.712 (2020)

Standard abbreviations
- ISO 4: Appl. Psychol.

Indexing
- CODEN: ADPYE4
- ISSN: 0269-994X (print); 1464-0597 (web)
- OCLC no.: 52066723

Links
- Journal homepage; Online access

Applied Psychology: An International Review (Psychologie Appliquée: Revue Internationale) is a peer-reviewed academic journal covering the field of applied psychology. Established in 1952, it is an official journal of the International Association of Applied Psychology and is published on their behalf by Wiley-Blackwell. It was formerly published by the Psychology Press, a subsidiary of Taylor & Francis. The editor-in-chief is Ute Stephan. Applied Psychology occasionally publishes special issues with guest editors and invited contributions which focus on certain themes.

Editors were: L. S. Hearnshaw (Great Britain), Claude Levy-Leboyer (France), Gerry Randell (Great Britain), Bernhard Wilpert (Germany), Michael Frese (Germany), Miriam Erez (Israel), Robert Wood (Australia), Vivien Lim (Singapore), and Ute Stephan (United Kingdom).

According to the Journal Citation Reports, the journal has a 2020 impact factor of 3.712, ranking it 27th out of 82 journals in the category "Psychology, Applied".
