= Stanford marshmallow experiment =

1970 study on delayed gratification

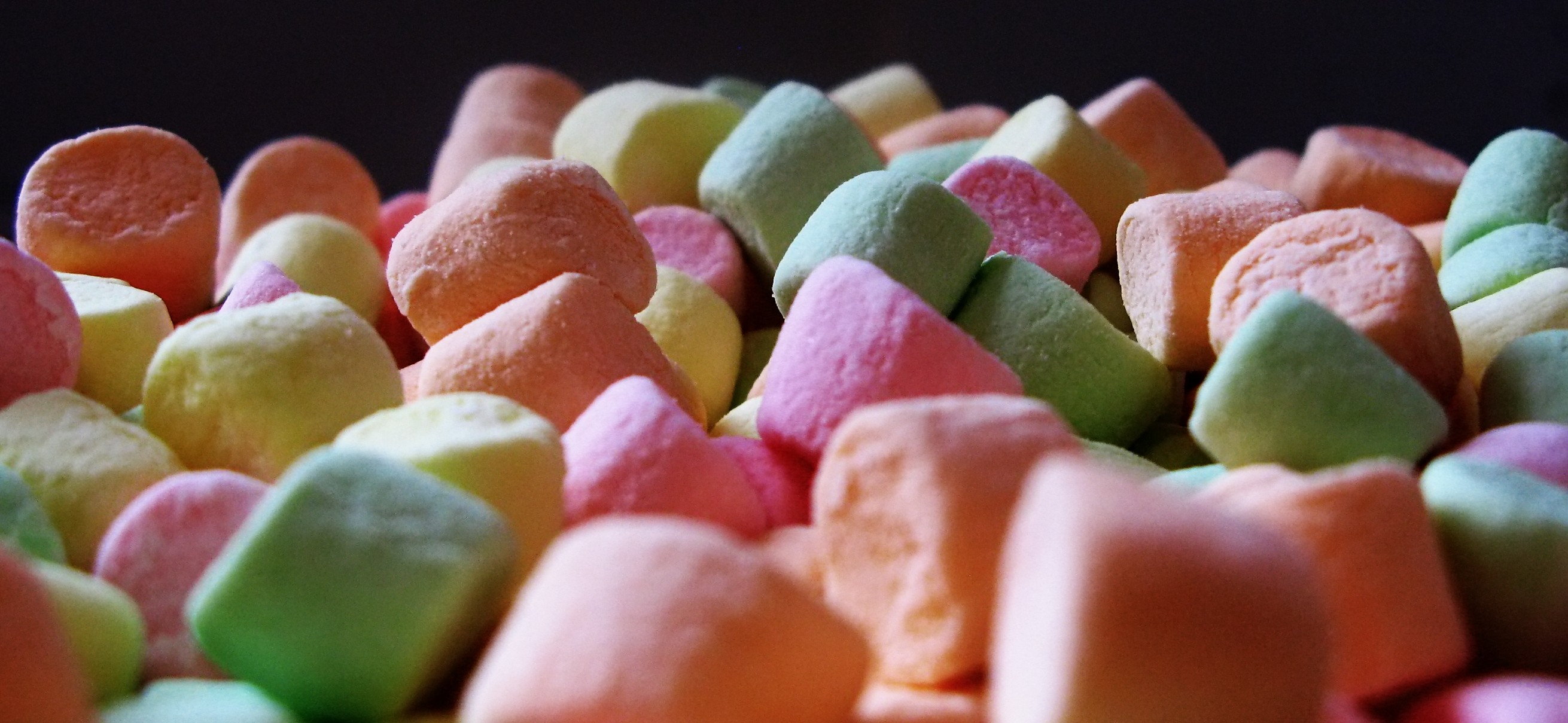
Colored marshmallows

The Stanford marshmallow experiment refers to a series of studies on delayed gratification led by psychologist Walter Mischel and collaborators at Stanford University starting in the late 1960s. The studies involved offering child participants a smaller, immediate reward, or a larger (or more preferred) reward if they waited for a period of time. Marshmallows were first introduced as a reward in the 1972 study by Mischel, Ebbe B. Ebbesen, and Antonette Raskoff Zeiss. Prior to that, Mischel and Ebbesen had run a 1970 delay-of-gratification study using animal cookies and pretzel sticks. Although alternative treats continued to be offered, the popular name focusing on marshmallows quickly stuck.

In follow-up studies, the researchers found that children who were able to wait longer for the preferred rewards tended to have better life outcomes, as measured by SAT scores, educational attainment, body mass index (BMI), and other life measures.

A replication attempt with a sample from a more diverse population that was over 10 times larger than the original study showed only half the effect of the original study. The replication suggested that economic background, rather than willpower, explained the other half. The predictive power of the marshmallow test was challenged in a 2020 study. Work done in 2018 and 2024 found that the marshmallow test "does not reliably predict adult functioning".

== Original Stanford experiment ==
The first experiment in delayed gratification was conducted by Walter Mischel and Ebbe B. Ebbesen at Stanford University in 1970. The purpose of the study was to understand when the control of delayed gratification, the ability to wait to obtain something that one wants, develops in children. Most of the research conducted during that time was done with delayed rewards in areas such as time perspective and the delay of rewards, resistance to temptation, and psychological disturbances. Not many studies had been conducted in the area of human social behavior. The authors hypothesized that an increased salience of a reward would in turn increase the amount of time children would be able to delay gratification (or wait). Since the rewards were presented in front of them, children were reminded of why they were waiting. The attention on the reward (that was right in front of them) was supposed to make them wait longer (for the larger reward).

The children were led into a room, empty of distractions, where a treat of their choice (either two animal cookies or five pretzel sticks) were placed on a table. The researchers let the children know they could eat the treat, but if they waited 15 minutes without giving in to the temptation, they would be rewarded with a second treat. Mischel and Ebbesen observed, "(some children) covered their eyes with their hands, rested their heads on their arms, and found other similar techniques for averting their eyes from the reward objects. Many seemed to try to reduce the frustration of delay of reward by generating their own diversions: they talked to themselves, sang, invented games with their hands and feet, and even tried to fall asleep while waiting – as one successfully did."

=== Participants ===
32 children were enrolled as participants in this experiment, including 16 boys and 16 girls. The participants attended the Bing Nursery School of Stanford University. The children ranged in age from three years and six months, to five years and eight months. The median age was four years and six months. Three subjects were disqualified from the experiment because they were unable to understand the instructions and choices given by the experimenters.

=== Detailed procedure ===
The procedures were conducted by two experimenters. There was an opaque cake tin presented on a table in the experimental room. Under the cake tin, there were five pretzels and two animal cookies. There were two chairs in front of the table; on one chair was an empty cardboard box. Near the chair with the empty cardboard box, there were four battery operated toys on the floor. The experimenter pointed out the four toys before the child could play with the toys. The experimenter asked the child to sit in the chair and then demonstrated each toy briefly, and in a friendly manner said they would play with the toys later on. Then the experimenter placed each toy in the cardboard box and out of sight of the child. The experimenter explained to the child that he needed to leave the room, and if the child ate the pretzel, the experimenter would return to the room. These instructions were repeated until the child seemed to understand them completely. The experimenter left the room and waited for the child to eat the pretzel – they repeated this procedure four times. The experimenter returned to the experimental room and opened the cake tin to reveal two sets of rewards (in the form of edibles): five pretzels and two animal crackers. The experimenter asked the child which of the two they preferred. Once the child chose, the experimenter explained that the child could either continue to wait for the more preferred reward until the experimenter returned, or the child could stop waiting by bringing back the experimenter. If the child stopped waiting then the child would receive the less preferred reward and forgo the more preferred one. Depending on the condition and the child's choice of preferred reward, the experimenter picked up the cake tin and along with it either nothing, one of the rewards, or both. The experimenter returned either as soon as the child signaled him to do so or after 15 minutes.

=== Results ===
The results indicated the exact opposite of what was originally predicted. Instead of the rewards serving as a cue to attend to possible delayed rewards, the rewards themselves served to increase the children's frustration and ultimately decreased the delay of gratification. The results seemed to indicate that not thinking about a reward enhances the ability to delay gratification, rather than focusing attention on the future reward.

== Stanford marshmallow experiment ==
=== Purpose ===
The following study, conducted by Mischel, Ebbesen, and Zeiss (1972), is generally recognized as the Stanford marshmallow experiment due to its use of marshmallows as a preferred reward item. Building on information obtained in previous research regarding self-control, Mischel et al hypothesized that any activity that distracts a participant from the reward they are anticipating will increase the time of delay gratification. It was expected that overt activities, internal cognitions, and fantasies would help in this self-distraction. Through such distraction it was also hypothesized that the subject would be able to take the frustrative nature of the situation and convert it into one psychologically less aversive. To test their expectations, the researchers contrived three settings under which to test participants; an overt activity, a covert activity, or no activity at all. They predicted that under the overt and covert activities that delay of gratification should increase, while under the no activity setting it would decrease. To assess the children's ability to understand the instructions they were given, the experiment asked them three comprehension questions; "Can you tell me, which do you get to eat if you wait for me to come back by myself?", "But if you want to, how can you make me come back?", and "If you ring the bell and bring me back, then which do you get?" Three distinct experiments were conducted under multiple differing conditions.

=== Experiment 1 ===
==== Participants ====
The participants consisted of 50 children (25 boys and 25 girls) from the Bing Nursery School at Stanford University. They ranged in age from 3 years 6 months to 5 years 6 months. The median age was 4 years 6 months. Six subjects were eliminated because they failed to comprehend the instructions given by the experimenters. Whitney Tilson, later a hedge fund manager, philanthropist, author, and Democratic political activist, was a participant in the study.

==== Procedures ====
The procedures were conducted by one male and one female experimenter. During the test conditions the male experimenter conducted his session with 3 male and 2 female participants, while the female experimenter conducted her session with 3 female and 2 male participants. The small room where the tests were conducted contained a table equipped with a barrier between the experimenter and the child. On the table, behind the small barrier, was a slinky toy along with an opaque cake tin that held a small marshmallow and pretzel stick. Next to the table equipped with the barrier there was another table that contained a box of battery- and hand-operated toys, which were visible to the child. Against one wall of the small room there was a chair, another table, and a desk bell. In experiment 1, the children were tested under the conditions of (1) waiting for delayed reward with an external distractor (toy), (2) waiting for delayed reward with an internal distractor (ideation), (3) waiting for a delayed reward (no distractor), (4) external distractor (toy) without delay-of-reward waiting contingency, and (5) internal distractor (ideation) without delay of reward contingency.

=== Experiment 2 ===
==== Participants ====
The participants consisted of 32 children from the Bing Nursery School of Stanford University. They ranged in age from 3 years 9 months to 5 years 3 months. The mean age was 4 years and 9 months. Six of the subjects were eliminated from the study because they failed to comprehend the instructions or because they ate one of the reward objects while waiting for the experimenter.

==== Procedures ====
Experiment 2 focused on how the substantive content of cognitions can affect subsequent delay behavior. The conditions in Experiment 2 were the same as in Experiment 1, with the exception that after the three comprehension questions were asked of the children the experimenter suggested ideas to think about while they were waiting. These suggestions are referred to as "think food rewards" instructions in the study. They were intended to induce in the subject various types of ideation during the delay-of-gratification period.

=== Experiment 3 ===
==== Participants ====
The participants consisted of 16 children (11 boys and 5 girls). They ranged in age from 3 years 5 months to 5 years 6 months. The mean age was 4 years 6 months.

==== Procedures ====
In experiment 3 all of the conditions and procedures were the same as in experiment 1 and experiment 2, except that the reward items were not visible to the children while they waited. In the previous experiments both of the reward objects were directly available to the children while they waited in the delay period. To achieve this change in condition the children were told that the food items needed to be kept fresh. The marshmallow and pretzel stick were then placed under the opaque cake tin and put under the table out of sight of the child. In this experiment the same "think food rewards" were given to the children as in experiment 2.

=== Overall results ===
The three separate experiments demonstrate a number of significant findings. The effective delay of gratification depends heavily on the cognitive avoidance or suppression of the reward objects while waiting for them to be delivered. Additionally, when the children thought about the absent rewards, it was just as difficult to delay gratification as when the reward items were directly in front of them. Conversely, when the children in the experiment waited for the reward and it was not visibly present, they were able to wait longer and attain the preferred reward. The Stanford marshmallow experiment is important because it demonstrated that effective delay is not achieved by merely thinking about something other than what we want, but rather, it depends on suppressive and avoidance mechanisms that reduce frustration. The frustration of waiting for a desired reward is demonstrated by the authors when describing the behavior of the children. "They made up quiet songs ... hid their head in their arms, pounded the floor with their feet, fiddled playfully and teasingly with the signal bell, verbalized the contingency ... prayed to the ceiling, and so on. In one dramatically effective self-distraction technique, after obviously experiencing much agitation, a little girl rested her head, sat limply, relaxed herself, and proceeded to fall sound asleep."

== Follow-up studies ==
In follow-up studies, Mischel found unexpected correlations between the results of the marshmallow experiment and the success of the children many years later. In 1988, the first follow-up study showed that "preschool children who delayed gratification longer in the self-imposed delay paradigm, were described more than 10 years later by their parents as adolescents who were significantly more competent." In 1990, a second follow-up study showed that the ability to delay gratification also correlated with higher SAT scores. A 2006 paper to which Mischel contributed reports a similar experiment, this time relating ability to delay in order to receive a cookie (at age 4) and reaction time on a go/no go task.

A 2011 brain imaging study of a sample from the original Stanford participants when they reached mid-life showed key differences between those with high delay times and those with low delay times in two areas: the prefrontal cortex (more active in high delayers) and the ventral striatum, (more active in low delayers) when they were trying to control their responses to alluring temptations. A 2012 study at the University of Rochester (with a smaller N= 28) altered the experiment by dividing children into two groups: one group was given a broken promise before the marshmallow test was conducted (the unreliable tester group), and the second group had a fulfilled promise before their marshmallow test (the reliable tester group). The reliable tester group waited up to four times longer (12 min) than the unreliable tester group for the second marshmallow to appear. The authors argue that this calls into question the original interpretation of self-control as the critical factor in children's performance, since self-control should predict ability to wait, not strategic waiting when it makes sense. Prior to the marshmallow experiment at Stanford, Walter Mischel had shown that the child's belief that the promised delayed rewards would actually be delivered is an important determinant of the choice to delay, but his later experiments did not take this factor into account or control for individual variation in beliefs about reliability when reporting correlations with life successes.

In the studies Mischel and his colleagues conducted at Stanford University, in order to establish trust that the experimenter would return, at the beginning of the "marshmallow test" children first engaged in a game in which they summoned the experimenter back by ringing a bell; the actual waiting portion of the experiment did not start until after the children clearly understood that the experimenter would keep the promise. Participants of the original studies at the Bing School at Stanford University appeared to have no doubt that they would receive a reward after waiting and chose to wait for the more desirable reward. However, Mischel's earlier studies showed there are many other situations in which children cannot be certain that they would receive the delayed outcome. In such situations, waiting for delayed rewards may not be an adaptive response. Watts, Duncan, and Quan's 2018 conceptual replication yielded mostly statistically insignificant correlations with behavioral problems but a significant correlation with achievement tests at age 15. These effects were lower than in the original experiment and reduced further when controlling for early cognitive ability and behavior, family background, and home environment.

A 2020 study at University of California showed that "reputation management" plays a significant role in the experiment—children would wait for nearly twice as long when told that their teacher would know how long they waited for. In findings presented in the journal Proceedings of the Royal Society B in 2021, Marine Biological Laboratory, researchers described cuttlefish (Sepia officinalis) that were able to pass an adapted version of the marshmallow test. Cephalopods engage in "future-oriented foraging" and the nine-month-old cuttlefish in the experiments were able to tolerate delays of 50 to 130 seconds, comparable to the performances of chimpanzees and crows. Individuals that had better self-control also demonstrated greater cognition in learning tests. A 2022 paper published in Psychological Science found that cultural differences can affect the marshmallow test. The study assessed Japanese and American children, with each child given a marshmallow or a wrapped gift with a delay before they could obtain a second. Results showed the Japanese group waited longer for another marshmallow, while the American group excelled on wrapped gifts. The authors argued this was due to how cultures contrast. In Japan, people gift more often around the year without a wait versus in the United States where people hold back opening presents on specific occasions like in birthdays. Additionally, parents of the Japanese participants reported having their children wait longer for meals compared to their American counterparts. A 2024 study extended the approach of Watts et al and found that "Marshmallow Test performance does not reliably predict adult outcomes."
