= Pentamethylcyclopentadienyl iridium dichloride dimer =

Names
- IUPAC name Di-μ-chloro-bis[chloro(pentamethylcyclopentadienyl)iridium(III)]
- Other names Dichloro(pentamethylcyclopentadienyl)iridium(III)

Identifiers
CAS Number	12354-84-6
3D model (JSmol)	Interactive image
ChemSpider	26583490
ECHA InfoCard	100.205.779
EC Number	680-648-4
PubChem CID	131674877
UNII	6OY4UUC534
- InChI: InChI=1S/2C10H16.4ClH.2Ir/c2*1-6-7(2)9(4)10(5)8(6)3;;;;;;/h2*6H,1-5H3;4*1H;;/p-4 Key: PGQVOTGCKISIMD-UHFFFAOYSA-J
- SMILES: c1(C)=c(C)c(C)=c(C)c1(C)[Ir](Cl)(Cl1)Cl[Ir](Cl)1C1(C)C(C)=C(C)C(C)=C1C

Properties
Chemical formula	C_{20}H_{30}Cl_{4}Ir_{2}
Molar mass	796.71 g/mol
Appearance	orange solid
Melting point	>230 °C
Solubility in water	Dichloromethane, Chloroform
- Except where otherwise noted, data are given for materials in their standard state (at 25 °C [77 °F], 100 kPa). verify (what is ?) Infobox references

Pentamethylcyclopentadienyl iridium dichloride dimer is an organometallic compound with the formula [(C_{5}(CH_{3})_{5}IrCl_{2})]_{2}, commonly abbreviated [Cp*IrCl_{2}]_{2} This bright orange air-stable diamagnetic solid is a reagent in organometallic chemistry.

== Structure ==
The compound has C_{2h} symmetry. Each metal is pseudo-octahedral. The terminal and bridging Ir-Cl bonds have the lengths 2.39 and 2.45 Å, respectively.

== Preparation, reactions ==
Pentamethylcyclopentadienyl iridium dichloride dimer was first prepared by the reaction of hydrated iridium trichloride with hexamethyl Dewar benzene. More conveniently, the compound is prepared by the reaction of hydrated iridium trichloride and pentamethylcyclopentadiene in hot methanol, from which the product precipitates

2 Cp*H + 2 IrCl_{3}(H_{2}O)_{3} → [Cp*IrCl_{2}]_{2} + 2 HCl + 6 H_{2}O

The Ir-μ-Cl bonds are labile and can be cleaved to give a variety of adducts of the general formula Cp*IrCl_{2}L. Such adducts undergo further substitution to afford cations [Cp*IrClL_{2}]^{+} and [Cp*IrL_{3}]^{2+}. The chloride ligands can also be replaced by other anions such as carboxylates, nitrite, and azide.

Reduction of [Cp*IrCl_{2}]_{2} in the presence of CO affords [Cp*Ir(CO)_{2}], which can be decarbonylated to give the unsaturated derivative [Cp*Ir(CO)]_{2}. Treatment of [Cp*IrCl_{2}]_{2} with borohydride under an atmosphere of H_{2} gives the iridium(V) derivative Cp*IrH_{4}.

[Cp*IrCl_{2}]_{2} is a precursor to catalysts for the asymmetric transfer hydrogenation of ketones.

== Related compounds ==
- The 16e monomer (^{t}Bu_{3}C_{5}H_{2})IrCl_{2}
- Pentamethylcyclopentadienyl rhodium dichloride dimer
