= Metallomesogen =

Metal complexes with liquid crystalline behavior

Metallomesogens are metal complexes that exhibit liquid crystalline behavior. Thus, they adopt ordered structures in the molten phase, e.g. smectic and nematic phases. The dominant interactions responsible for their phase behavior are the nonbonding contacts between organic substituents. Two early classes of such materials are based on substituted ferrocenes and dithiolene complexes; more recent work shows that alkoxystilbazoles have similar utility.
