= Antonette M. Zeiss =

American clinical psychologist

Antonette Zeiss
- Occupation: Psychologist
- Spouse: Robert Zeiss
- Awards: Society of Clinical Geropsychology Distinguished Mentorship Award (2004); APA Committee on Aging Award (2006); United States Presidential Rank Award of Meritorious (2009); Antonette Zeiss Distinguished Leadership Award (2010); Association for Behavioral and Cognitive Therapy Lifetime Achievement Award (2011); APA Award for Lifetime Contributions to Psychology (2013)

Academic background
- Education: Stanford University; University of Oregon

Academic work
- Discipline: Clinical psychology
- Institutions: United States Department of Veterans Affairs

Antonette Marie Zeiss (née Wood; formerly Raskoff) is an American clinical psychologist. Zeiss was chief consultant for mental health services at the Central Office of the United States Department of Veterans Affairs – the first woman and the first psychologist and nonphysician to hold this position. In 2013, she received the APA Award for Lifetime Contributions to Psychology from the American Psychological Association (APA).

== Biography ==
Antonette Marie Wood was born in Solano County, California and grew up in Santa Crux with two brothers. She credited her mother for teaching her to "Never turn your back on a wave. If you turn around, face the wave, dive under it and don't be afraid of it." Her advice to women in leaderships includes being nice, being responsible, staying involved, having vision, and growing things.

She received her undergraduate degree at Stanford University, where she did research on delayed gratification, including the famous Stanford marshmallow experiment together with Walter Mischel. She completed her PhD in Clinical Psychology at the University of Oregon in 1977, mentored by Peter Lewinsohn.

In 1971, she married a fellow psychologist, Robert Zeiss, whom she met when he was an undergraduate at Stanford University and she was the research director for Walter Mischel, after her graduation. It was her second marriage.

== Research and work ==
Zeiss worked as a faculty member at Arizona State University and as a visiting faculty member Stanford University. Afterwards she joined the Department of Veterans Affairs (VA), where she was Director of Interdisciplinary Team Training in Geriatrics and later Director of Psychology Training at the Palo Alto Health Care System. In 2005 she became the deputy chief consultant for the Office of Mental Health Services at the Department of Veterans Affairs Central Office (VACO), from 2010 to 2012 she was chief consultant. Her research career focused on cognitive behavioral therapy in the treatment of depression, and mental health and sexuality in later life.

Zeiss is active in the Women in Leadership Special Interest Group of the Association of VA Psychology Leaders. The group wants to promote topics relevant for female psychologists in leadership positions and support them. She was co-chair of this group in the past, as well. In 2010 the Association of VA Psychology Leaders established the Antonette Zeiss Distinguished Leadership Award to honor VA psychologists who have shown expert leadership during their career and a strong commitment to the work of providing health care for Veterans. Zeiss herself was the first recipient of this award.

After her retirement in 2012, Zeiss served as a member of the APA Board of Professional Affairs.

== Books ==
- Heinemann, G. D., & Zeiss, A. M. (Eds.). (2002). Team performance in health care: Assessment and development. Kluwer Academic/Plenum Publishers.
- Zeiss, R. A., & Zeiss, A. (1978). Prolong your pleasure. Pocket books.

== Representative papers ==
- Zeiss, A. M., Gallagher-Thompson, D., Lovett, S., Rose, J., & McKibbin, C. (1999). Self-efficacy as a mediator of caregiver coping: Development and testing of an assessment model. Journal of Clinical Geropsychology, 5(3), 221–230.
- Zeiss, A. M., & Karlin, B. E. (2008). Integrating mental health and primary care services in the Department of Veterans Affairs health care system. Journal of Clinical Psychology in Medical Settings, 15(1), 73–78.
- Zeiss, A., & Kasl-Godley, J. (2001). Sexuality in older adults' relationships. Generations, 25(2), 18–25.
- Zeiss, A. M., & Lewinsohn, P. M. (1988). Enduring deficits after remissions of depression: A test of the scar hypothesis. Behaviour Research and Therapy, 26(2), 151–158.
- Zeiss, A. M., Lewinsohn, P. M., & Muñoz, R. F. (1979). Nonspecific improvement effects in depression using interpersonal skills training, pleasant activity schedules, or cognitive training. journal of Consulting and Clinical Psychology, 47(3), 427–439.
- Zeiss, A. M., Lewinsohn, P. M., Rohde, P., & Seeley, J. R. (1996). Relationship of physical disease and functional impairment to depression in older people. Psychology and Aging, 11(4), 572–581.

== Awards and honors ==
2004: Society of Clinical Geropsychology's Distinguished Clinical Mentorship Award

2006: Award for the Advancement of Psychology and Aging from the APA Committee on Aging (CONA)

2007: APA Presidential Citation

2009: United States Presidential Rank Award of Meritorious

2010: Antonette Zeiss Distinguished Leadership Award

2011: Lifetime Achievement Award from the Association for Behavioral and Cognitive Therapy

2013: Award for Lifetime Contributions to Psychology from the American Psychological Association
