= Journal of School Psychology =

- Discipline: School psychology
- Language: English
- Edited by: Craig Albers

Publication details
- History: 1963–present
- Publisher: Elsevier on behalf of the Society for the Study of School Psychology
- Frequency: Quarterly
- Impact factor: 3.000 (2016)

Standard abbreviations
- ISO 4: J. Sch. Psychol.

Indexing
- ISSN: 0022-4405 (print); 1873-3506 (web)
- LCCN: 68052341
- OCLC no.: 780562464

Links
- Journal homepage; Online archive

The Journal of School Psychology is a quarterly peer-reviewed scientific journal covering school psychology. It was established in 1963 and is published by Elsevier on behalf of the Society for the Study of School Psychology, of which it is the official journal. The editor-in-chief is Craig Albers (University of Wisconsin–Madison). According to the Journal Citation Reports, the journal has a 2016 impact factor of 3.000.
