= Dication =

Divalent positive ion

A dication is any cation, of general formula X^{2+}, formed by the removal of two electrons from a neutral species.

Diatomic dications corresponding to stable neutral species (e.g. H^{2+}_{2} formed by removal of two electrons from H_{2}) often decay quickly into two singly charged particles (H^{+}), due to the loss of electrons in bonding molecular orbitals. Energy levels of diatomic dications can be studied with good resolution by measuring the yield of pairs of zero-kinetic-energy electrons from double photoionization of a molecule as a function of the photoionizing wavelength (threshold photoelectrons coincidence spectroscopy – TPEsCO). The He^{2+}_{2} dication is kinetically stable.

An example of a stable diatomic dication which is not formed by oxidation of a neutral diatomic molecule is the dimercury dication Hg^{2+}_{2}. An example of a polyatomic dication is S^{2+}_{8}, formed by oxidation of S_{8} and unstable with respect to further oxidation over time to form SO_{2}.

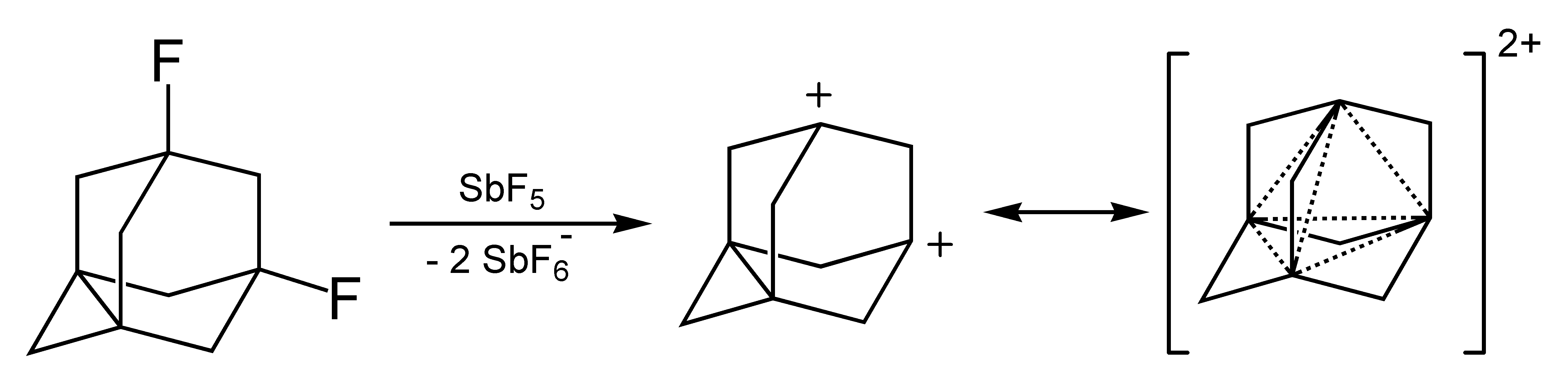
Many organic dications can be detected in mass spectrometry for example CH^{2+}_{4} (a CH^{2+}_{2}·H_{2} complex) and the acetylene dication C_{2}H^{2+}_{2}. The adamantyl dication has been synthesized.

== Divalent metals ==
Some metals are commonly found in the form of dications when in the form of salts, or dissolved in water. Examples include the alkaline earth metals (Be^{2+}, Mg^{2+}, Ca^{2+}, Sr^{2+}, Ba^{2+}, Ra^{2+}); later 3d transition metals (V^{2+}, Cr^{2+}, Mn^{2+}, Fe^{2+}, Co^{2+}, Ni^{2+}, Cu^{2+}, Zn^{2+}); group 12 elements (Zn^{2+}, Cd^{2+}, Hg^{2+}); and the heavy members of the carbon group (Sn^{2+}, Pb^{2+}).

== Presence in space ==
Multiply-charged atoms are quite common in the Solar System in the so-called Solar wind. Among these, the most abundant dication is He^{2+} (an alpha particle). However, molecular dications, in particular CO_{2}^{2+}, have never been observed so far though predicted to be present for instance at Mars. Indeed, this ion by means of its symmetry and strong double bounds is more stable (longer lifetime) than other dications. In 2020, the molecular dication CO_{2}^{2+} has been confirmed to be present in the atmosphere of Mars and around Comet 67P.
