= European Association of Work and Organizational Psychology =

- Abbreviation: EAWOP
- Predecessor: European Congress of Work and Organizational Psychology
- Formation: 1991
- Founded at: Rouen, France
- Type: Professional association
- Purpose: Research
- Headquarters: Rotterdam, Netherlands
- Region served: Europe
- Fields: Industrial and organizational psychology
- President: Frederik Anseel
- Website: www.eawop.org

The European Association of Work and Organizational Psychology (abbreviated EAWOP) is the primary professional organization for industrial and organizational psychologists in Europe. Its registered office is located in Rotterdam, Netherlands. Its official journal is the European Journal of Work and Organizational Psychology, which is published bimonthly by Routledge.

== History ==
The EAWOP grew out of the European Network on Work and Organizational Psychology, which was founded in 1980. The EAWOP itself was established in 1991 at the 5th European Congress for Work & Organizational Psychology in Rouen, France. Its founding president, Robert Roe, established links between the newly formed organization and the European Federation of Psychologists' Associations.
