= European Journal of Work and Organizational Psychology =

- Discipline: Industrial and organizational psychology
- Language: English

Publication details
- History: 1991-present
- Publisher: European Association of Work and Organizational Psychology (Belgium)
- Frequency: Quarterly

Standard abbreviations
- ISO 4: Eur. J. Work Organ. Psychol.

Indexing
- ISSN: 1359-432X

Links
- Journal homepage

The European Journal of Work and Organizational Psychology was established in 1991 and is a peer-reviewed academic journal published quarterly by the European Association of Work and Organizational Psychology. Content includes papers on organizational change, organizational climate, teamwork, motivation, innovation, leadership, bullying, stress in the workplace, burnout, job satisfaction, job design, selection and training.

== See also ==
- Industrial and organizational psychology
- Occupational health psychology
