= Journal of Occupational and Organizational Psychology =

- Discipline: occupational and organizational psychology
- Language: English

Publication details
- Former names: Journal of Occupational Psychology, Occupational Psychology
- History: 1976-present
- Publisher: Wiley-Blackwell on behalf of the British Psychological Society (United Kingdom)
- Frequency: Quarterly
- Impact factor: 5.119 (2021)

Standard abbreviations
- ISO 4: J. Occup. Organ. Psychol.

Indexing
- CODEN: JOCCEF
- ISSN: 0963-1798 (print); 2044-8325 (web)
- LCCN: 92643970
- OCLC no.: 44539624

Links
- Journal homepage; Online access; Online archive

The Journal of Occupational and Organizational Psychology is a quarterly peer-reviewed academic journal published by Wiley-Blackwell on behalf of the British Psychological Society. It covers all aspects of occupational and organizational psychology, and also includes behavioral and cognitive aspects of industrial relations and human factors and ergonomics. The journal is also an outlet for articles in the management fields of organizational behavior and human resource management. It was established in 1922 as Occupational Psychology and was renamed Journal of Occupational Psychology in 1975 when ownership was transferred to the British Psychological Society.

== Abstracting and indexing ==
The journal is abstracted and indexed in:

- Current Index to Statistics
- EBSCO databases
- Environmental Sciences & Pollution Management
- International Bibliography of the Social Sciences
- InfoTrac
- Inspec
- ProQuest databases
- PsycINFO/Psychological Abstracts
- Scopus
- Social Sciences Citation Index

According to the Journal Citation Reports, the journal has a 2017 impact factor of 4.561.
