= Society for Industrial and Organizational Psychology =

Professional psychology organization

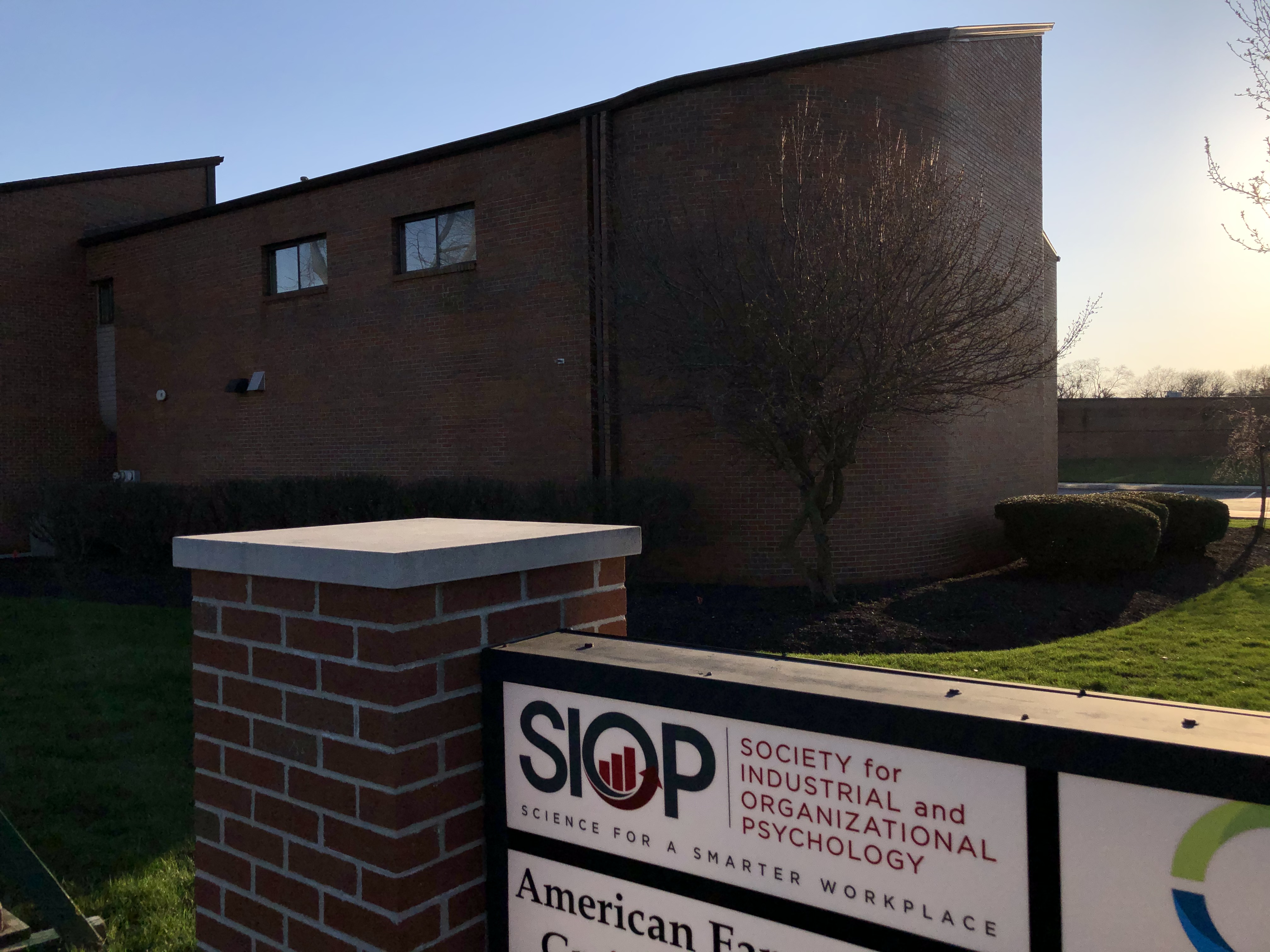
- The office of SIOP in Bowling Green, Ohio.
- Location: Bowling Green, Ohio

The Society for Industrial and Organizational Psychology (SIOP) is a professional organization that promotes the "science, practice, and teaching" of industrial and organizational (I/O) psychology. SIOP is also known as Division 14 of the American Psychological Association (APA). The society publishes I/O-related journals, provides its members with resources (e.g., continuing education, salary information), and organizes an annual conference.

SIOP publishes a quarterly newsletter The Industrial/Organizational Psychologist (TIP) that contains articles about the association and the profession. It is available open access on the SIOP website (www.siop.org).

== History ==
In its original charter, APA was dedicated to advancing psychology as a science. APA did not originally embrace applied psychology although a number of important figures in industrial psychology, including Hugo Munsterberg and Walter Dill Scott, were early members of the organization. Applied psychologists began to militate for recognition by APA. In 1919, APA created a division to accommodate clinical psychology. APA nonetheless did not enlarge its charter to include the promotion of applied psychology. In response applied psychologists developed other professional organizations.

Applied psychologists founded in 1921 the New York Association of Consulting Psychologists (ACP), an organization that embraced clinical, educational, and industrial psychology. By 1930, many applied psychologists who had become dissatisfied with APA had joined ACP. In 1936, ACP president Gertrude Hildreth asked industrial psychologist members to form a committee devoted to improving the status of industrial psychology and developing standards and a code of ethics to govern practice. In 1937, ACP established the Journal of Consulting Psychology, which in 1968 changed its name to the Journal of Consulting and Clinical Psychology.

Beginning in 1936, under the leadership of Douglas Fryer of NYU, applied psychologists organized themselves into several groupings. State and local organizations were formed. By 1937 the American Association of Applied Psychology (AAAP) was formed to provide representation for applied professionals. Within the organization, a section devoted to business and industry was formed along with sections for educational, consulting, and clinical psychology.

In 1945, the AAAP, APA, and the Society for the Psychological Study of Social Issues (SPSSI) began to collaborate in response to a request from the National Research Council. Eventually the three organizations merged. The four sections of the AAAP became divisions within APA. The industrial psychology division of AAAP became Division 14 of APA, and was initially called the Industrial and Business Psychology Division.

The division's name was changed in 1962 to the Industrial Psychology Division. In 1973, it was renamed again, this time to the Division of Industrial and Organizational Psychology. In 1982, in response to "tension between science and practice" in APA and APA's attempt to control the practice of I/O psychology, the division incorporated as the Society for Industrial and Organizational Psychology, and gained "an independent and secure base."
