= Methylmagnesium bromide =

Names
- IUPAC name bromido(methyl)magnesium

Identifiers
CAS Number	75-16-1
3D model (JSmol)	Interactive image
ChEBI	CHEBI:51492
ChemSpider	21171184
ECHA InfoCard	100.000.768
EC Number	200-844-1
PubChem CID	6349
UNII	22CW9773DF
UN number	1928
CompTox Dashboard (EPA)	DTXSID7052496
- InChI: InChI=1S/CH3.BrH.Mg/h1H3;1H;/q;;+1/p-1; InChI=1/CH3.BrH.Mg/h1H3;1H;/q;;+1/p-1/rCH3Mg.BrH/c1-2;/h1H3;1H/q+1;/p-1
- SMILES: [Br-].[Mg+]C

Properties
Chemical formula	CH_{3}MgBr
Molar mass	119.244 g·mol^{−1}
Appearance	colorless solid
Solubility in water	Reacts with water
Solubility	soluble in diethyl ether and THF

Hazards
- Occupational safety and health (OHS/OSH)
Main hazards	Flammable, reacts violently with water, severe skin burns and serious eye damage
- GHS labelling
Pictograms	(GHS02: Flammable) (GHS05: Corrosive)
Signal word	Danger
Hazard statements	H225, H250, H260, H314
Precautionary statements	P210, P222, P223, P231+P232, P233, P240, P241, P242, P243, P260, P264, P280, P301+P330+P331, P302+P334, P303+P361+P353, P304+P340, P305+P351+P338, P310, P321, P335+P334, P363, P370+P378, P402+P404, P403+P235, P405, P422, P501
NFPA 704 (fire diamond)	3 3 2 W
Flash point	−17 °C (1 °F; 256 K)

Related compounds
Related compounds	Phenylmagnesium bromide; Dimethylmagnesium; Dibutylmagnesium
- Except where otherwise noted, data are given for materials in their standard state (at 25 °C [77 °F], 100 kPa). verify (what is ?) Infobox references

Methylmagnesium bromide is an organomagnesium compound described with the general formula CH_{3}MgBr. It is a colorless and moisture-sensitive compound. It is one of the simplest Grignard reagents. It is commercially available as a solution in tetrahydrofuran (thf).

== Synthesis and reactions ==
It is prepared by the reaction of methyl bromide and magnesium in ethyl ether. and methylmagnesium iodide, methylmagnesium chloride offers the advantages of low equivalent weight and low cost.

Like methyllithium, it is the synthetic equivalent to the methyl carbanion synthon. It reacts with water, alcohols and other protic reagents to give methane, e.g.,:

CH_{3}MgBr + ROH → CH_{4} + "ROMgBr"

When treated with dioxane, ether solutions of methylmagnesium bromide reacts to give the insoluble coordination polymer with the formula MgCl_{2}(dioxane)_{2}. Remaining in the solution is the dioxane adduct of dimethylmagnesium. This conversion exploits the Schlenk equilibrium, which is driven to the right by the precipitation of the magnesium halide:

2 CH_{3}MgBr + 2 dioxane → (CH_{3})_{2}Mg + MgBr_{2}(dioxane)_{2}

== Structure ==
As with most Grignard reagents, methylmagnesium bromide is usually deployed as a complex containing ether or thf as ligands. In these etherial solutions multiple species may coexist. The trigonal bipyramidal complex CH_{3}MgBr(thf)_{3} has been crystallized and identified by X-ray crystallography.

== See also ==
- Methylation
- Methylmagnesium chloride
