= Methylmagnesium chloride =

Names
- IUPAC name chlorido(methyl)magnesium
- Other names (chloromagnesio)methane

Identifiers
| CAS Number | 676-58-4; 75-16-1 (bromide) |
| 3D model (JSmol) | Interactive image |
| ChEBI | CHEBI:51492 |
| ChemSpider | 10610396 |
| ECHA InfoCard | 100.010.573 |
| EC Number | 211-629-7 |
| PubChem CID | 12670 |
| UNII | M5E1132G4W; 22CW9773DF (bromide) |
| CompTox Dashboard (EPA) | DTXSID7052365 |
- InChI: InChI=1S/CH3.ClH.Mg/h1H3;1H;/q;;+1/p-1 Key: RQNMYNYHBQQZSP-UHFFFAOYSA-M; InChI=1/CH3.ClH.Mg/h1H3;1H;/q;;+1/p-1/rCH3Mg.ClH/c1-2;/h1H3;1H/q+1;/p-1 Key: RQNMYNYHBQQZSP-OWCPXFRBAR
- SMILES: [Cl-].[Mg+]C

Properties
| Chemical formula | CH_{3}MgCl |
| Molar mass | 74.79 g·mol^{−1} |
| Appearance | colorless solid |
| Solubility in water | Reacts with water |
| Solubility | soluble in diethyl ether and THF |

Hazards
- Occupational safety and health (OHS/OSH)
| Main hazards | Flammable, reacts violently with water, severe skin burns and serious eye damage |
- GHS labelling
| Pictograms | (GHS02: Flammable) (GHS05: Corrosive) |
| Signal word | Danger |
| Hazard statements | H225, H250, H260, H314 |
| Precautionary statements | P210, P222, P223, P231+P232, P233, P240, P241, P242, P243, P260, P264, P280, P301+P330+P331, P302+P334, P303+P361+P353, P304+P340, P305+P351+P338, P310, P321, P335+P334, P363, P370+P378, P402+P404, P403+P235, P405, P422, P501 |
| NFPA 704 (fire diamond) | 3 3 2 W |
| Flash point | −17 °C (1 °F; 256 K) |

Related compounds
| Related compounds | Phenylmagnesium bromide; Dimethylmagnesium; Dibutylmagnesium |
- Except where otherwise noted, data are given for materials in their standard state (at 25 °C [77 °F], 100 kPa). verify (what is ?) Infobox references

Methylmagnesium chloride is an organomagnesium compound described with the general formula CH_{3}MgCl. This highly flammable, colorless, and moisture sensitive compound is the simplest Grignard reagent and is commercially available, usually as a solution in tetrahydrofuran.

== Synthesis and reactions ==
Relative to the more commonly encountered methylmagnesium bromide and methylmagnesium iodide, methylmagnesium chloride offers the advantages of low equivalent weight and low cost. It is prepared by the reaction of methyl chloride and magnesium in ethyl ether.

Like methyllithium, it is the synthetic equivalent to the methyl carbanion synthon. It reacts with water, alcohols and other protic reagents to give methane, e.g.,:

CH_{3}MgCl + ROH → CH_{4} + ROMgCl

When treated with dioxane, ether solutions of methylmagnesium chloride reacts to give the insoluble coordination polymer with the formula MgCl_{2}(dioxane)_{2}. Remaining in the solution is the dioxane adduct of dimethylmagnesium. This conversion exploits the Schlenk equilibrium, which is driven to the right by the precipitation of the magnesium halide:

2 CH_{3}MgCl + 2 dioxane → (CH_{3})_{2}Mg + MgCl_{2}(dioxane)_{2}

== Structure and speciation ==
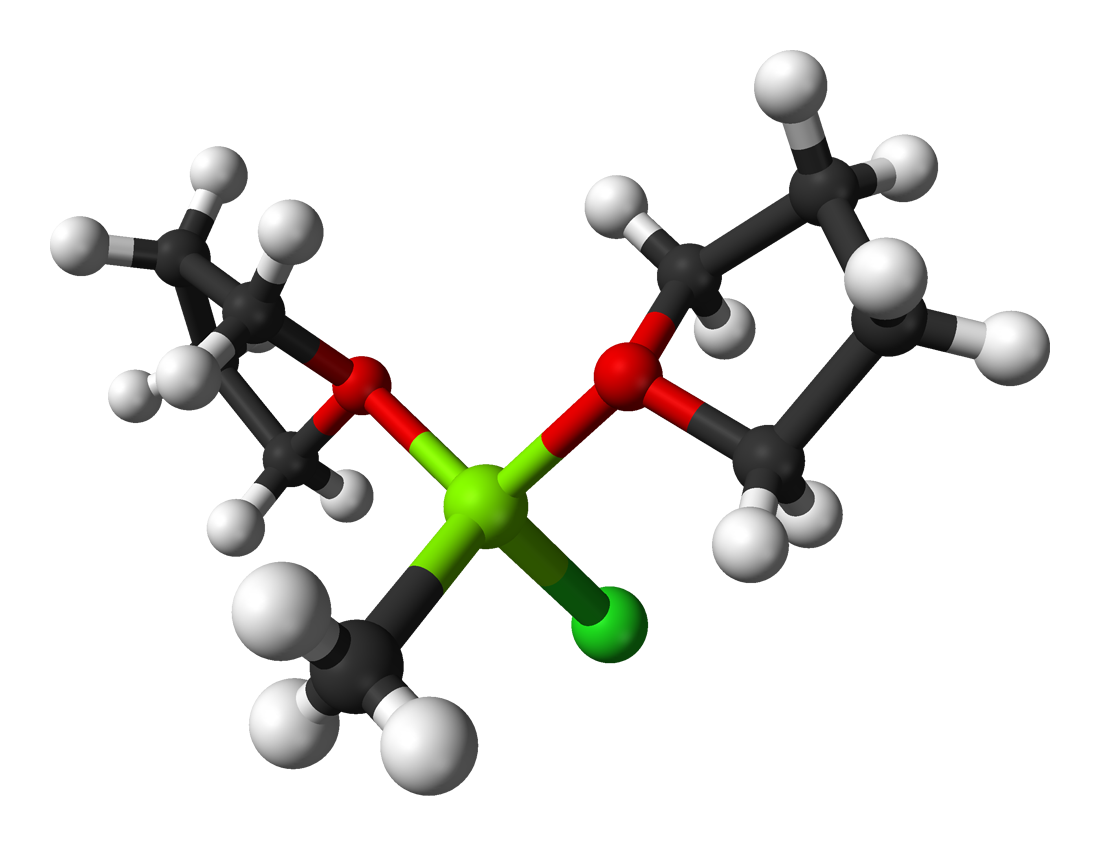
Structure of CH_{3}MgCl(THF)_{2}, which is representative of the species in donor solvents.

As with most Grignard reagents, methylmagnesium chloride is a coordination complex. The Mg center is bonded to two ether ligands to give a tetrahedrally bonded magnesium center.

In ether solution, methylmagnesium chloride consists at least in part of the cluster (CH_{3})_{2}Mg_{4}Cl_{6}(THF)_{6}.

== See also ==
- Methylation
