= Albert Leon Henne =

American chemist

Albert Leon Henne (1901–1967) was an American chemist known for his work on refrigerants.

Henne was born in Brussels, Belgium in 1901. He earned his PhD from the University of Brussels in 1925 with a dissertation titled "The Stereoisomers of Chloroiodoethylene". He came to the United States in 1925 as a fellow of the Belgian-American Education foundation at Massachusetts Institute of Technology and became a naturalized citizen in 1933.

Henne's association with the Ohio State University Department of Chemistry began in 1931 when he began service as a Special Lecturer and as Director of Research for what was formally called the Midgley Foundation housed in the organic chemistry laboratories at OSU. He served in this capacity until 1938 when he was appointed associate professor of chemistry. He assisted Professor Cecil E. Boord in setting up and organizing the American Petroleum Institute Project at Ohio State. Henne was appointed Professor of Chemistry in 1942 and served in this capacity as a teacher and research advisor until just before his death in 1967.

In his research, Henne developed many of the different freon variants, bringing modern refrigeration to the masses, and pioneering organofluorine chemistry.
