= Phenylmagnesium bromide =

Names
- IUPAC name Bromido(phenyl)magnesium
- Other names PMB, (bromomagnesio)benzene

Identifiers
CAS Number	100-58-3
3D model (JSmol)	Interactive image
ChEBI	CHEBI:51238
ChemSpider	10254417
ECHA InfoCard	100.002.607
EC Number	202-867-2
PubChem CID	66852
UNII	XU8P4V3J7G
CompTox Dashboard (EPA)	DTXSID3059214
- InChI: InChI=1S/C6H5.BrH.Mg/c1-2-4-6-5-3-1;;/h1-5H;1H;/q;;+1/p-1 Key: ANRQGKOBLBYXFM-UHFFFAOYSA-M; InChI=1/C6H5.BrH.Mg/c1-2-4-6-5-3-1;;/h1-5H;1H;/q;;+1/p-1/rC6H5BrMg/c7-8-6-4-2-1-3-5-6/h1-5H Key: ANRQGKOBLBYXFM-ZAQPMBKGAV
- SMILES: Br[Mg]c1ccccc1

Properties
Chemical formula	C_{6}H_{5}MgBr
Molar mass	181.315 g·mol^{−1}
Appearance	Colorless crystals
Density	1.14 g cm^{−3}
Solubility in water	Reacts with water
Solubility	3.0M in diethyl ether, 1.0M in THF, 2.9M in 2-MeTHF
Acidity (pK_{a})	45 (conjugate acid)

Hazards
- Occupational safety and health (OHS/OSH)
Main hazards	Causes severe skin burns and serious eye damage, very flammable, volatile
- GHS labelling
Pictograms	(GHS02: Flammable) (GHS05: Corrosive)
Signal word	Danger
Hazard statements	H225, H314
Precautionary statements	P210, P233, P240, P241, P242, P243, P260, P264, P280, P301+P330+P331, P303+P361+P353, P304+P340, P305+P351+P338, P310, P321, P363, P370+P378, P403+P235, P405, P501
Flash point	−45 °C (−49 °F; 228 K)
Safety data sheet (SDS)	External MSDS

Related compounds
Related compounds	Phenyllithium; Magnesium bromide; Methylmagnesium chloride; Dibutylmagnesium
- Except where otherwise noted, data are given for materials in their standard state (at 25 °C [77 °F], 100 kPa). verify (what is ?) Infobox references

Phenylmagnesium bromide, with the simplified formula C_{6}H_{5}MgBr, is an organomagnesium compound. It forms colorless crystals although its solutions generally appear dark. It is commercially available as a solution in diethyl ether or tetrahydrofuran (THF). Phenylmagnesium bromide is a Grignard reagent. It is used as a synthetic equivalent for the phenyl "Ph^{−}" synthon.

== Preparation ==
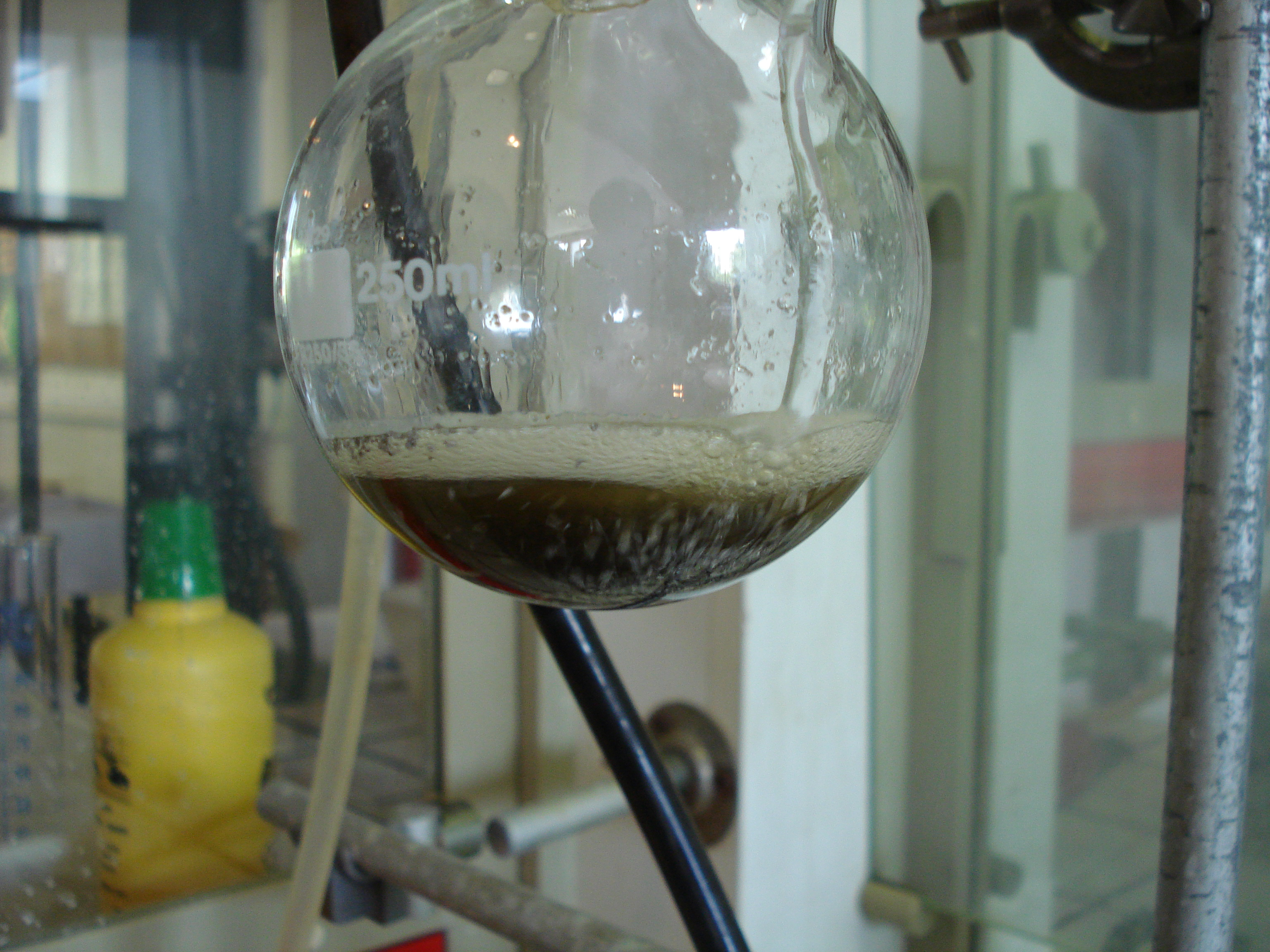
Phenylmagnesium bromide is prepared by reaction of bromobenzene with magnesium metal.

Phenylmagnesium bromide is commercially available as solutions of diethyl ether or THF. Laboratory preparation involves treating bromobenzene with magnesium metal, usually in the form of turnings. A small amount of iodine may be used to activate the magnesium to initiate the reaction.

Coordinating solvents such as ether or THF, are required to solvate (complex) the magnesium(II) center. The solvent must be aprotic since alcohols and water contain an acidic proton and thus react with phenylmagnesium bromide to give benzene. Carbonyl-containing solvents, such as acetone and ethyl acetate, are also incompatible with the reagent.

== Structure ==
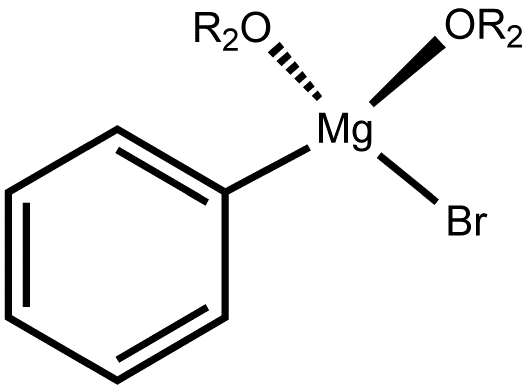
Structure of ether adducts of phenylmagnesium bromide where OR_{2} an ether.

Although phenylmagnesium bromide is routinely represented as C_{6}H_{5}MgBr, the compound's structure is more complicated. Like most Grignard reagents, phenylmagnesium bromide is invariably observed as an adduct with various Lewis bases. Examples include the diethyl ether and tetrahydrofuran complexes C_{6}H_{5}MgBr[O(C_{2}H_{5})_{2}]_{2} and C_{6}H_{5}MgBr(OC_{4}H_{8})_{2}, respectively. Thus, the Mg in those adducts is tetrahedral and obeys the octet rule. The Mg–O distances are 201 and 206 pm, and the Mg–C and Mg–Br distances are 220 pm and 244 pm, respectively in the diethyl ether complex. In their reactions of these complexes, these ether ligands dissociate.

== Reactions ==
Phenylmagnesium bromide is a strong nucleophile as well as a strong base. It can abstract even mildly acidic protons. It often adds to ketones to give tertiary alcohols. With carbon dioxide, it reacts to give benzoic acid after an acidic workup. If it is treated equivalents with one third equivalent of phosphorus trichloride, triphenylphosphine results.
