= Butane =

Flammable organic fuel (C4H10)

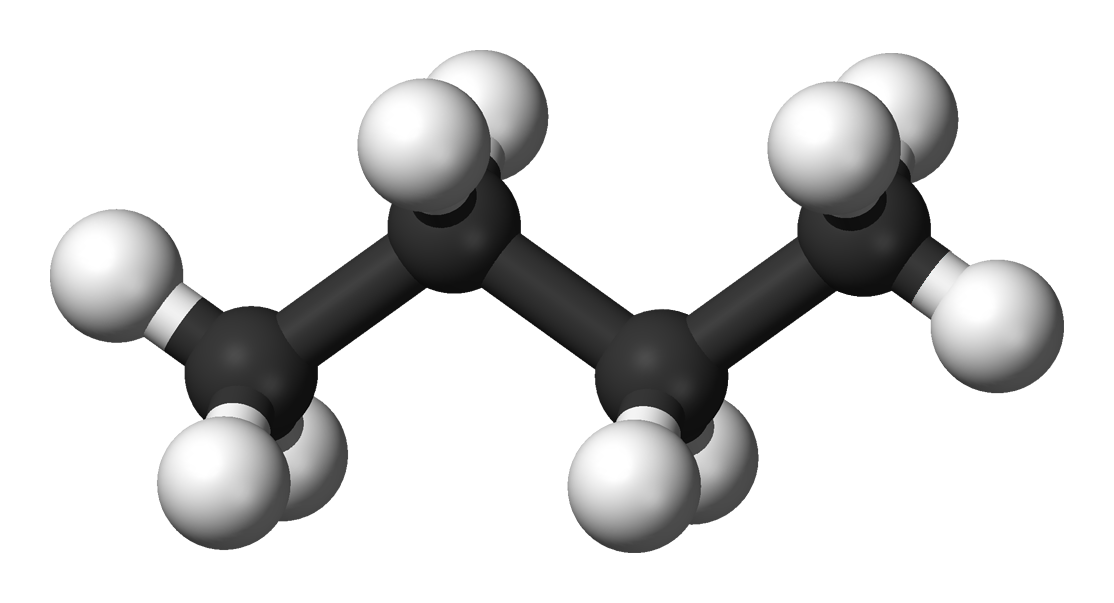

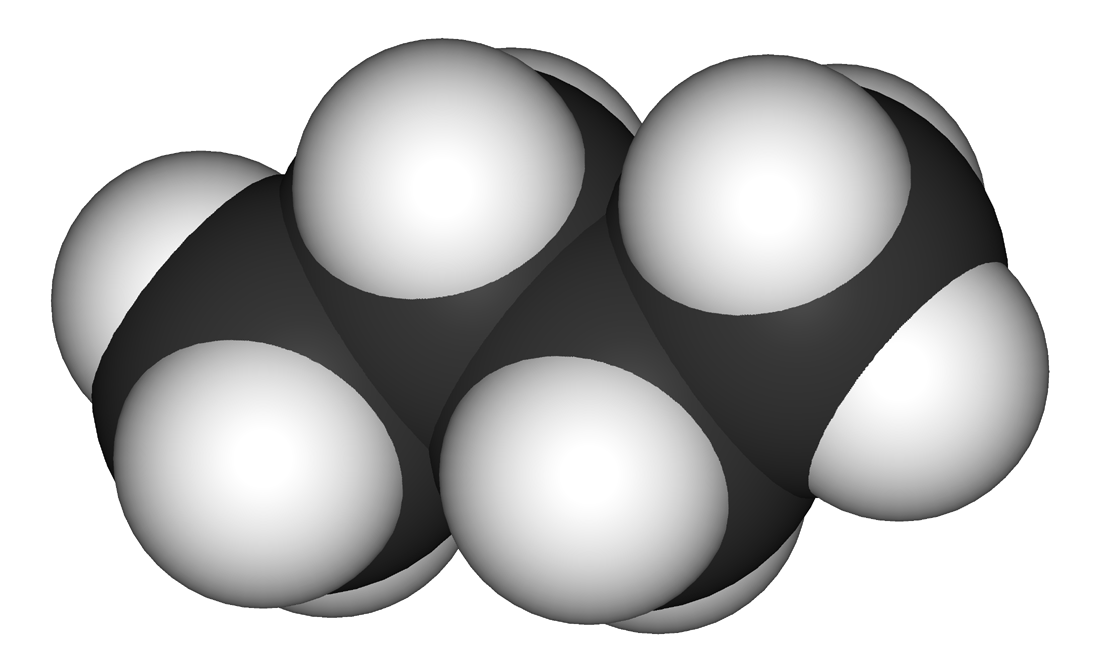

Names
- Preferred IUPAC name Butane
- Systematic IUPAC name Tetracarbane (never recommended)
- Other names: Butyl hydride; Quartane; R600

Identifiers
CAS Number	106-97-8
3D model (JSmol)	Interactive image
Beilstein Reference	969129
ChEBI	CHEBI:37808
ChEMBL	ChEMBL134702
ChemSpider	7555
ECHA InfoCard	100.003.136
EC Number	203-448-7
E number	E943a (glazing agents, ...)
Gmelin Reference	1148
KEGG	D03186
MeSH	butane
PubChem CID	7843
RTECS number	EJ4200000
UNII	6LV4FOR43R
UN number	1011
CompTox Dashboard (EPA)	DTXSID7024665
- InChI: InChI=1S/C4H10/c1-3-4-2/h3-4H2,1-2H3 Key: IJDNQMDRQITEOD-UHFFFAOYSA-N
- SMILES: CCCC

Properties
Chemical formula	C_{4}H_{10}
Molar mass	58.124 g·mol^{−1}
Appearance	Colorless gas
Odor	Gasoline-like or natural gas-like
Density	2.48 kg/m^{3} (at 15 °C (59 °F))
Melting point	−140 to −134 °C; −220 to −209 °F; 133 to 139 K
Boiling point	−1 to 1 °C; 30 to 34 °F; 272 to 274 K
Solubility in water	61 mg/L (at 20 °C (68 °F))
log P	2.745
Vapor pressure	~170 kPa at 283 K
Henry's law constant (k_{H})	11 nmol Pa^{−1} kg^{−1}
Magnetic susceptibility (χ)	−57.4·10^{−6} cm^{3}/mol

Thermochemistry
Heat capacity (C)	98.49 J/(K·mol)
Std enthalpy of formation (Δ_{f}H^{⦵}_{298})	−126.3–−124.9 kJ/mol
Std enthalpy of combustion (Δ_{c}H^{⦵}_{298})	−2.8781–−2.8769 MJ/mol

Hazards
- GHS labelling
Pictograms	(GHS02: Flammable) (GHS04: Compressed Gas)
Signal word	Danger
Hazard statements	H220
Precautionary statements	P203, P210, P222, P280, P377, P381, P403
NFPA 704 (fire diamond)	1 4 0 SA
Flash point	−60 °C (−76 °F; 213 K)
Autoignition temperature	405 °C (761 °F; 678 K)
Explosive limits	1.8–8.4%
- NIOSH (US health exposure limits)
PEL (Permissible)	none
REL (Recommended)	TWA 800 ppm (1900 mg/m^{3})
IDLH (Immediate danger)	1600 ppm

Related compounds
Related alkanes	Propane; Isobutane; Pentane
Related compounds	Perfluorobutane

Supplementary data page
- Butane (data page)
- Except where otherwise noted, data are given for materials in their standard state (at 25 °C [77 °F], 100 kPa). verify (what is ?) Infobox references

Butane (/ˈbjuːteɪn/) is an alkane with the formula C_{4}H_{10}. Butane exists as two isomers, n-butane, CH_{3}CH_{2}CH_{2}CH_{3} and iso-butane, (CH_{3})_{3}CH. Both isomers are highly flammable, colorless, easily liquefied gases that quickly vaporize at room temperature and pressure. Butanes are a trace component of natural gases, which contain higher concentrations of other hydrocarbons such as propane, ethane, and especially methane. Liquefied petroleum gas is a mixture of propane and some butanes.

The name butane comes from the root but- (from butyric acid, named after the Greek word for butter) and the suffix -ane (for organic compounds).

== History ==
The first synthesis of butane was accidentally achieved by British chemist Edward Frankland in 1849 from ethyl iodide and zinc, but he had not realized that the ethyl radical had dimerized, and thus misidentified the substance.

Butane was discovered in crude petroleum in 1864 by Edmund Ronalds, who was the first to describe its properties, which he named "hydride of butyl", based on the naming for the then-known butyric acid, which had been named and described by the French chemist Michel Eugène Chevreul 40 years earlier. Other names arose in the 1860s: "butyl hydride", "hydride of tetryl" and "tetryl hydride", "diethyl" or "ethyl ethylide" and others. August Wilhelm von Hofmann, in his 1866 systemic nomenclature, proposed the name "quartane", and the modern name was introduced to English from German around 1874.

Butane did not have much practical use until the 1910s, when W. Snelling identified butane and propane as components in gasoline. He found that if they were cooled, they could be stored in a volume-reduced liquified state in pressurized containers. In 1911, Snelling's liquified petroleum gas was publicly available, and his process for producing the mixture was patented in 1913. Butane is one of the most produced industrial chemicals in the 21st century, with around 80 to 90 billion lbs (40 million US tons, 36 million metric tons) produced by the United States every year.

== Isomers ==
Common name	normal butane unbranched butane n-butane	isobutane i-butane
IUPAC name	butane	methylpropane
Molecular diagram		
Skeletal diagram		

Rotation about the central C−C bond produces four different conformations (trans, gauche, cis and anticlinal) for n-butane.

== Reactions ==
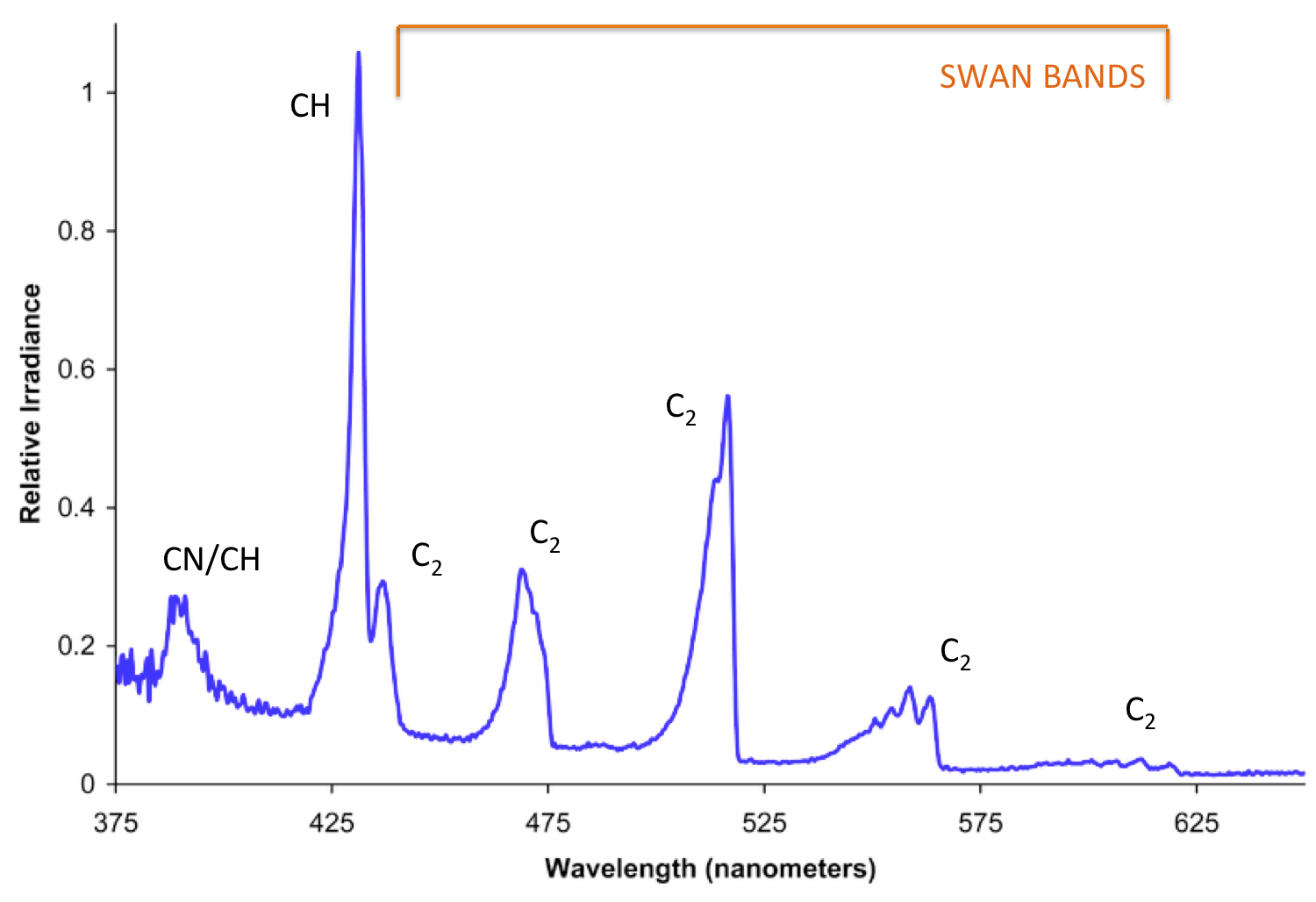
Spectrum of the blue flame from a butane torch showing CH molecular radical band emission and C_{2} Swan bands

When oxygen is plentiful, butane undergoes complete combustion to form carbon dioxide and water vapor; when oxygen is limited, due to incomplete combustion, carbon (soot) or carbon monoxide may be formed instead of carbon dioxide. Butane is denser than air.

When there is sufficient oxygen:

2 C_{4}H_{10} + 13 O_{2} → 8 CO_{2} + 10 H_{2}O

When oxygen is limited:

2 C_{4}H_{10} + 9 O_{2} → 8 CO + 10 H_{2}O

By weight, butane contains about 49.5 MJ/kg (13.8 kWh/kg; 22.5 MJ/lb; 21,300 Btu/lb) or by liquid volume 29.7 megajoules per liter (8.3 kWh/L; 112 MJ/U.S. gal; 107,000 Btu/U.S. gal).

The maximum adiabatic flame temperature of butane with air is 2,243 K (1,970 °C; 3,578 °F).

n-Butane is the feedstock for DuPont's catalytic process for the preparation of maleic anhydride:

2 CH_{3}CH_{2}CH_{2}CH_{3} + 7 O_{2} → 2 C_{2}H_{2}(CO)_{2}O + 8 H_{2}O

n-Butane, like all hydrocarbons, undergoes free radical chlorination providing both 1-chloro- and 2-chlorobutanes, as well as more highly chlorinated derivatives. The relative rates of the chlorinations are partially explained by the differing bond dissociation energies: 425 and 411 kJ/mol for the two types of C-H bonds.

== Uses ==
Normal butane can be used for gasoline blending, as a fuel gas, fragrance extraction solvent, either alone or in a mixture with propane, and as a feedstock for the manufacture of ethylene and butadiene, a key ingredient of synthetic rubber. Isobutane is primarily used by refineries to enhance (increase) the octane number of motor gasoline.

For gasoline blending, n-butane is the main component used to manipulate the Reid vapor pressure (RVP). Since winter fuel require much higher vapor pressure for engines to start, refineries raise the RVP by blending more butane into the fuel. n-Butane has a relatively high research octane number (RON) and motor octane number (MON), which are 93 and 92 respectively.

When blended with propane and other hydrocarbons, the mixture may be referred to commercially as liquefied petroleum gas (LPG). It is used as a petrol component, as a feedstock for the production of base petrochemicals in steam cracking, as fuel for cigarette lighters and as a propellant in aerosol sprays such as deodorants.

Pure forms of butane, especially isobutane, are used as refrigerants and have largely replaced the ozone-layer-depleting halomethanes in refrigerators, freezers, and air conditioning systems. The operating pressure for butane is lower than operating pressures for halomethanes such as Freon-12 (R-12). Hence, R-12 systems, such as those in automotive air conditioning systems, when converted to pure butane, will function poorly. Instead, a mixture of isobutane and propane is used to give cooling system performance comparable to R-12.

Butane is also used as lighter fuel for common lighters or butane torches, and is sold bottled as a fuel for cooking, barbecues and camping stoves. In the 20th century, the Braun company of Germany made a cordless hair styling device product that used butane as its heat source to produce steam.

As fuel, butane is often mixed with small amounts of mercaptans to give the unburned gas an offensive smell easily detected by the human nose. In this way, butane leaks can easily be identified. While hydrogen sulfide and mercaptans are toxic, they are present in levels so low that suffocation and fire hazard by the butane becomes a concern far before toxicity. Most commercially available butane also contains some contaminant oil, which can be removed by filtration. If not removed, it will otherwise leave a deposit at the point of ignition and may eventually block the uniform flow of gas.

The butane used as a solvent for fragrance extraction does not contain these contaminants. Butane gas can cause gas explosions in poorly ventilated areas if leaks go unnoticed and are ignited by spark or flame. Purified butane is used as a solvent in the industrial extraction of cannabis oils.

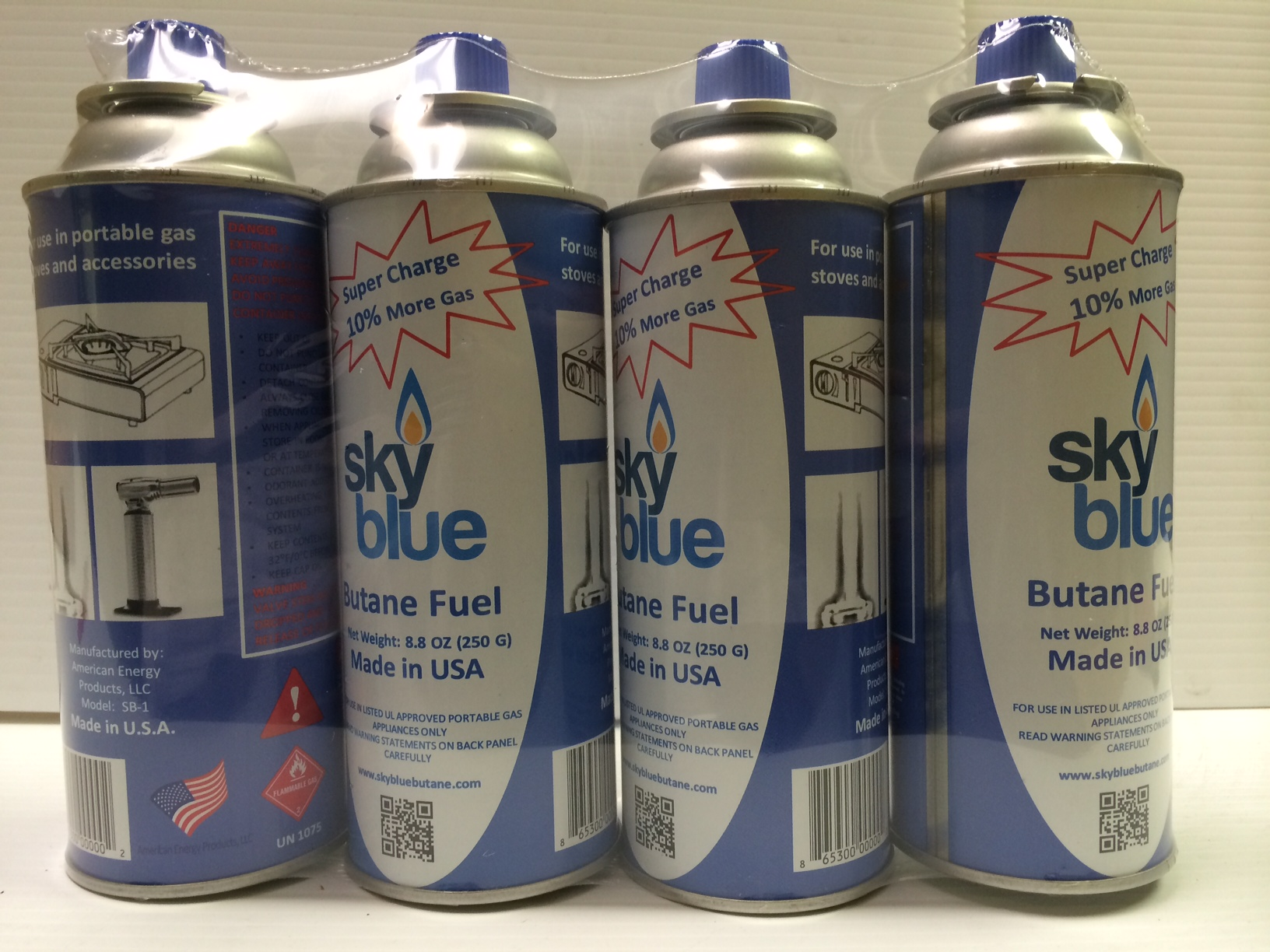
Butane fuel canisters for use in camping stoves

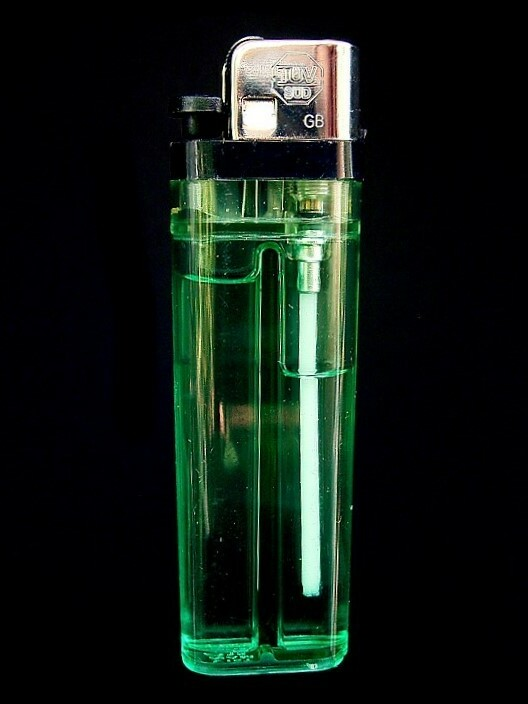
Butane lighter, showing liquid butane reservoir

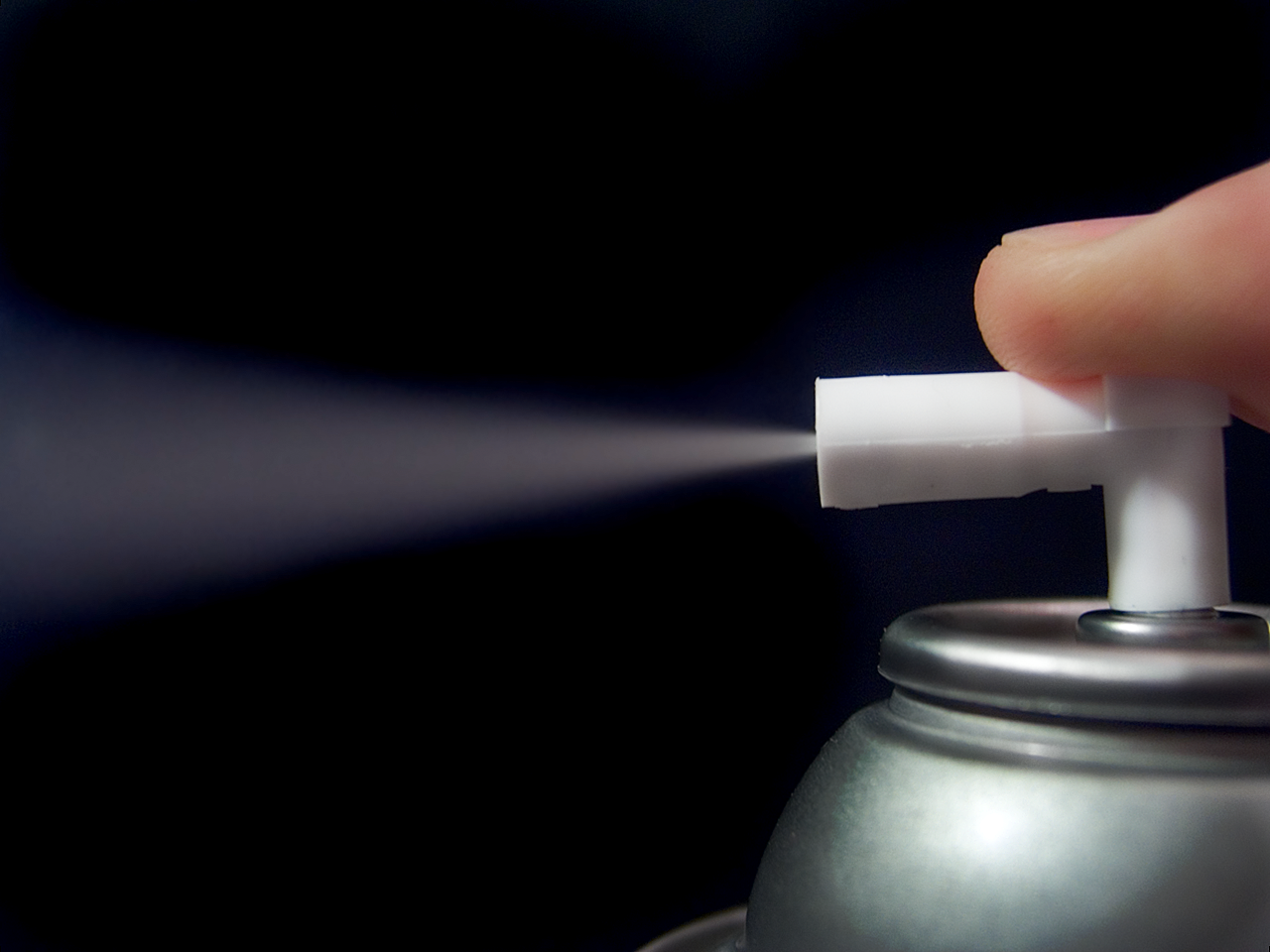
An aerosol spray can, which may be using butane as a propellant

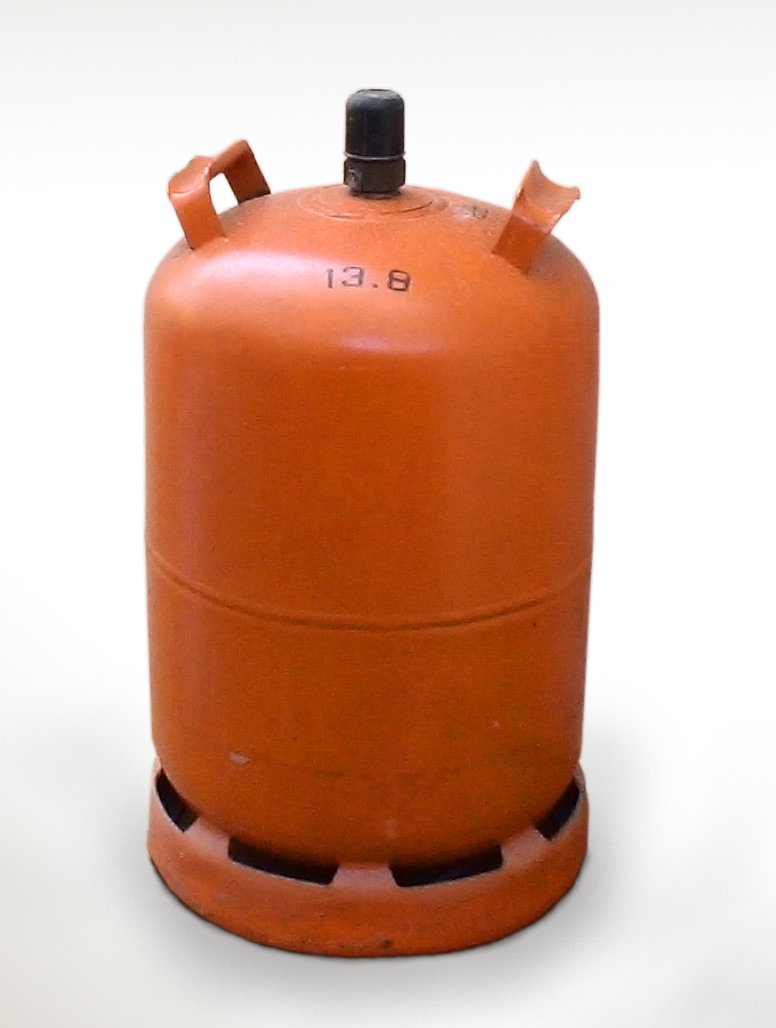
Butane gas cylinder used for cooking

== Health effects ==
Table from the 2010 ISCD study ranking various drugs (legal and illegal) based on statements by drug-harm experts. Butane was found to be the 14th overall most dangerous drug.

Inhalation of butane can cause euphoria, drowsiness, unconsciousness, asphyxia, cardiac arrhythmia, fluctuations in blood pressure and temporary memory loss, when abused directly from a highly pressurized container, and can result in death from asphyxiation and ventricular fibrillation. Butane enters the blood supply, and within seconds, leads to intoxication. Butane is the most commonly abused volatile substance in the UK, and was the cause of 52% of solvent related deaths in 2000. By spraying butane directly into the throat, the jet of fluid can cool rapidly to −20 °C (−4 °F) by expansion, causing prolonged laryngospasm. "Sudden sniffer's death" syndrome, first described by Bass in 1970, is the most common single cause of solvent related deaths, resulting in 55% of known fatal cases.

== See also ==
- Cyclobutane
- Volatile substance abuse
- Butane (data page)
- Industrial gas
