= Rieke metal =

Group specially prepared, highly reactive metal powder

A Rieke metal is a highly reactive metal powder generated by reduction of a metal salt with an alkali metal. These materials are named after Reuben D. Rieke, who first described along with an associate in 1972 the recipes for their preparation. In 1974 he wrote about Rieke-magnesium. A 1989 paper by Rieke lists several metals that are allowed by the periodic table to be produced by his process: Cd, Zn, Ni, Pt, Pd, Fe, In, Tl, Co, Cr, Mo, W, Cu, which in turn are called Rieke-nickel, Rieke-platinum, etc.

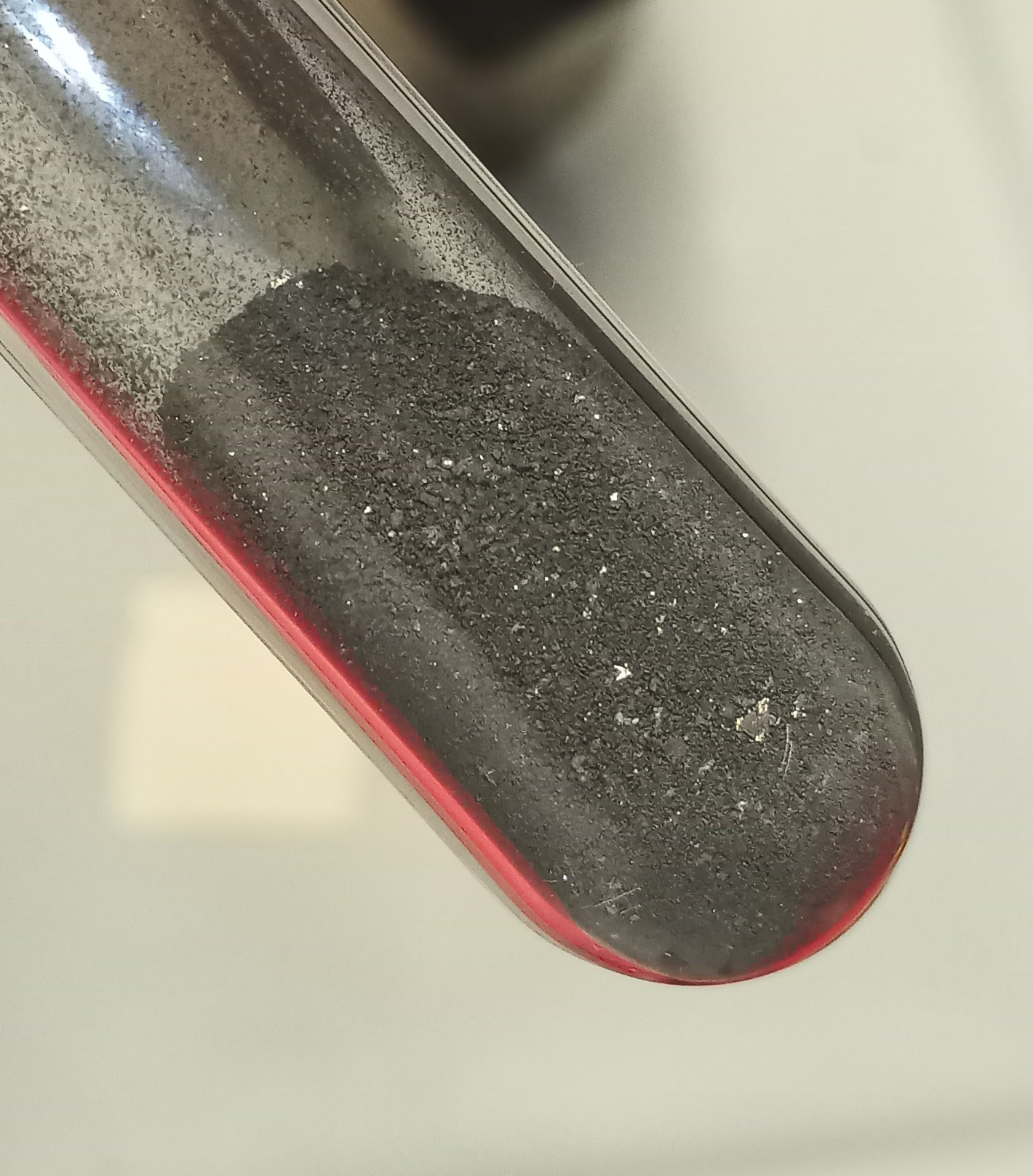
Highly reactive activated magnesium (Rieke magnesium)

Rieke metals are highly reactive because they have high surface area and lack surface oxides that can retard reaction of bulk materials. The particles are very small, ranging from 1-2 μm down to 0.1 μm or less. Some metals like nickel and copper give black colloidal suspensions that do not settle, even with centrifugation, and cannot be filtered. Other metals such as magnesium and cobalt give larger particles, but these are found to be composed mainly of the alkali salt by-product, with the metal dispersed in them as much finer particles or even as an amorphous phase.

== Preparation ==
Rieke metals are usually prepared by a reduction of an anhydrous metal chloride with an alkali metal, in a suitable solvent. For example, Rieke magnesium can be prepared from magnesium chloride with potassium as the reductant:

Rieke originally described three general procedures:

- Reaction with molten sodium or potassium in a solvent whose boiling point is higher than the metal's melting point, and which can dissolve some of the anhydrous salt, in an inert atmosphere. Suggested combinations were potassium in tetrahydrofuran (THF), sodium in 1,2-dimethoxyethane, and either metal with benzene or toluene. The exothermic reaction takes a few hours, and usually requires refluxing.
- Reaction with an alkali metal at temperatures below its melting point, with a catalytic amount (5-10% by mole) of an electron carrier such as naphthalene or biphenyl. This method can be used with lithium as the reducing agent, even at room temperature, and is therefore less hazardous than the previous method; and often results in more reactive powders.
- Reaction with previously prepared lithium naphthalide or lithium biphenylide instead of lithium. This process can be carried out at even lower temperatures, below ambient. Although slower, it was found to produce even smaller particles.

The alkali metal chloride coprecipitates with the finely divided metal, which can be used in situ or separated by washing away the alkali chloride with a suitable solvent.

== Uses ==
Rieke zinc has attracted the greatest attention of all the Rieke metals. Interest is motivated by the ability of Rieke Zn to convert 2,5-dibromothiophenes to the corresponding polythiophene. Rieke-Zn also reacts with bromoesters to give organozinc reagents of value for the Reformatsky reaction.

Rieke magnesium reacts with aryl halides, some even at −78 °C, to afford the corresponding Grignard reagents, often with considerable selectivity. Rieke magnesium is famous for enabling the formation of "impossible Grignard reagents" such as those derived from aryl fluorides and from 2-chloronorbornane.

== History ==
The use of highly reactive metals in chemical synthesis was popularized in the 1960s. One development in this theme is the use of metal vapor synthesis, as described by Skell, Timms, Ozin, and others. All of these methods relied on elaborate instrumentation to vaporize the metals, releasing an atomic form of these reactants.

In 1972, Reuben D. Rieke, a professor of chemistry at the University of North Carolina, published the method that now bears his name. In contrast to previous methods, it did not require special equipment, and the main challenges were only the handling of pyrophoric reagents and/or products, and the need for anhydrous reagents and air-free techniques. Thus his discovery gained much attention because of its simplicity and the reactivity of the activated metals.

Rieke continued this work at the University of Nebraska–Lincoln. He and his wife Loretta founded Rieke Metals LLC in 1991, based on these materials.

== Safety ==
Production and use of Rieke metals often involves the handling of highly pyrophoric materials, requiring the use of air-free techniques.
