= Dimethylmagnesium =

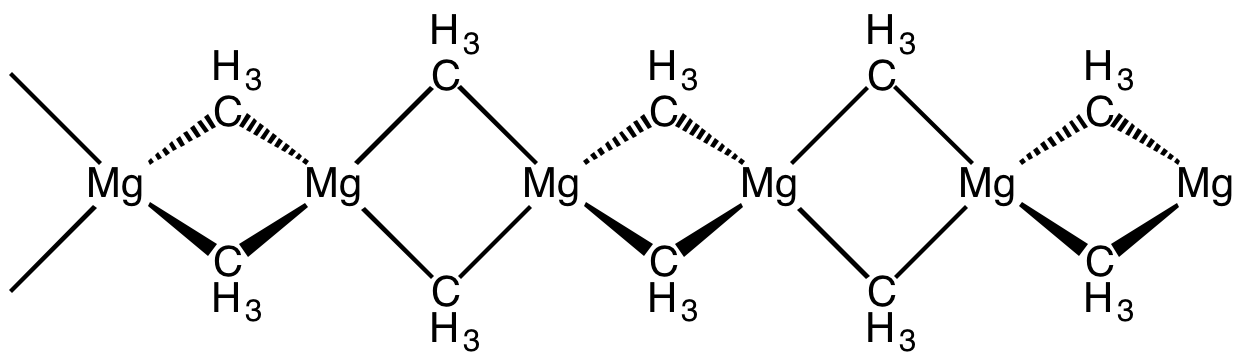

Names
- IUPAC name Dimethylmagnesium

Identifiers
CAS Number	2999-74-8
3D model (JSmol)	Interactive image
ChemSpider	10430979
PubChem CID	18141
UNII	3CAY272DHS
CompTox Dashboard (EPA)	DTXSID0062765
- InChI: InChI=1S/2CH3.Mg/h2*1H3; Key: KZLUHGRPVSRSHI-UHFFFAOYSA-N
- SMILES: C[Mg]C

Properties
Chemical formula	(CH_{3})_{2}Mg
Molar mass	54.375 g·mol^{−1}
Appearance	White solid
Density	0.96 g/cm3
Solubility in water	Reacts

Related compounds
Related compounds	Dibutylmagnesium; Dimethylzinc
- Except where otherwise noted, data are given for materials in their standard state (at 25 °C [77 °F], 100 kPa). verify (what is ?) Infobox references

Dimethylmagnesium is an organomagnesium compound with the chemical formula (CH_{3})_{2}Mg. It is a white pyrophoric solid. Dimethylmagnesium is used in the synthesis of organometallic compounds.

== Preparation ==
Like other dialkylmagnesium compounds, dimethylmagnesium is prepared by adding dioxane to a solution of methylmagnesium halide:

2 CH_{3}MgX + 2 dioxane ⇌ (CH_{3})_{2}Mg + MgX_{2}(μ-dioxane)_{2}↓

In such procedures, the dimethylmagnesium exists as the ether adduct, not the polymer.

Addition of 1,4-dioxane causes precipitation of solid MgX_{2}(μ-dioxane)_{2}, a coordination polymer. This precipitation drives the Schlenk equilibrium toward (CH_{3})_{2}Mg. Related methods have been applied to other dialkylmagnesium compounds.

Dimethylmagnesium can also be prepared by combining dimethylmercury and magnesium.

Calcium metal, magnesium metal and methyl iodide react in diethyl ether to produce dimethylmagnesium.

Ca + Mg + 2 CH_{3}I → CaI_{2} + (CH_{3})_{2}Mg

== Properties ==
Single crystals can be obtained by recrystallization of crude dimethylmagnesium from trimethylgallium. The structure of this compound has been determined by X-ray crystallography. The material is a polymer with the same connectivity as silicon disulfide, featuring tetrahedral magnesium centres, each surrounded by bridging methyl groups. The Mg-C distances are 223 pm. The Mg-Mg distances are 272 pm.

== Related compounds ==
The linear chain structure seen for dimethylmagnesium is also observed for diethylmagnesium and dimethylberyllium. Di(tert-butyl)magnesium is however a dimer.
