= Butane (data page) =

Chemical data page

This page provides supplementary chemical data on n-butane.

== Material Safety Data Sheet ==
The handling of this chemical may incur notable safety precautions. It is highly recommended to seek the Material Safety Datasheet (MSDS) for this chemical from a reliable source such as eChemPortal, and follow its directions.

== Structure and properties ==
Structure and properties
Index of refraction, n_{D}	1.3326 at 20 °C
Dielectric constant, ε_{r}	1.7697 ε_{0} at 23 °C
Symmetry group	C_{2h}
Magnetic susceptibility	?
Surface tension	12.46 dyn/cm at 20 °C; P ≈ 225 kPa

== Thermodynamic properties ==
Phase behavior
Density (liquid) 0 °C	600 kg/m³
Density (saturated vapor) 1 atm, -0.5 °C	2.6 kg/m³
Triple point	134.6 K (–138.5 °C), 0.7 Pa
Critical point	425.1 K (152.0 °C), 3796.0 kPa
Std enthalpy change of fusion, Δ_{fus}H^{~~o~~}	4.66 kJ/mol
Std entropy change of fusion, Δ_{fus}S^{~~o~~}	34.56 J/(mol·K)
Std enthalpy change of vaporization, Δ_{vap}H^{~~o~~}	22.44 kJ/mol
Std entropy change of vaporization, Δ_{vap}S^{~~o~~}	82.30 J/(mol·K)
Solid properties
Std enthalpy change of formation, Δ_{f}H^{~~o~~}_{solid}	? kJ/mol
Standard molar entropy, S^{~~o~~}_{solid}	? J/(mol K)
Heat capacity, c_{p}	? J/(mol K)
Liquid properties
Std enthalpy change of formation, Δ_{f}H^{~~o~~}_{liquid}	-147.6 kJ/mol
Standard molar entropy, S^{~~o~~}_{liquid}	229.7 J/(mol K)
Heat capacity, c_{p}	132.42 J/(mol K) –262 °C to –3 °C
Gas properties
Std enthalpy change of formation, Δ_{f}H^{~~o~~}_{gas}	–124.7 kJ/mol
Standard molar entropy, S^{~~o~~}_{gas}	310.23 J/(mol K)
Enthalpy of combustion, Δ_{c}H^{~~o~~}	–2877.5 kJ/mol
Heat capacity, c_{p}	98.49 J/(mol K) at 25 °C
n-butane van der Waals' constants	a = 1466.2 L^{2} kPa/mol^{2} b = 0.1226 liter per mole

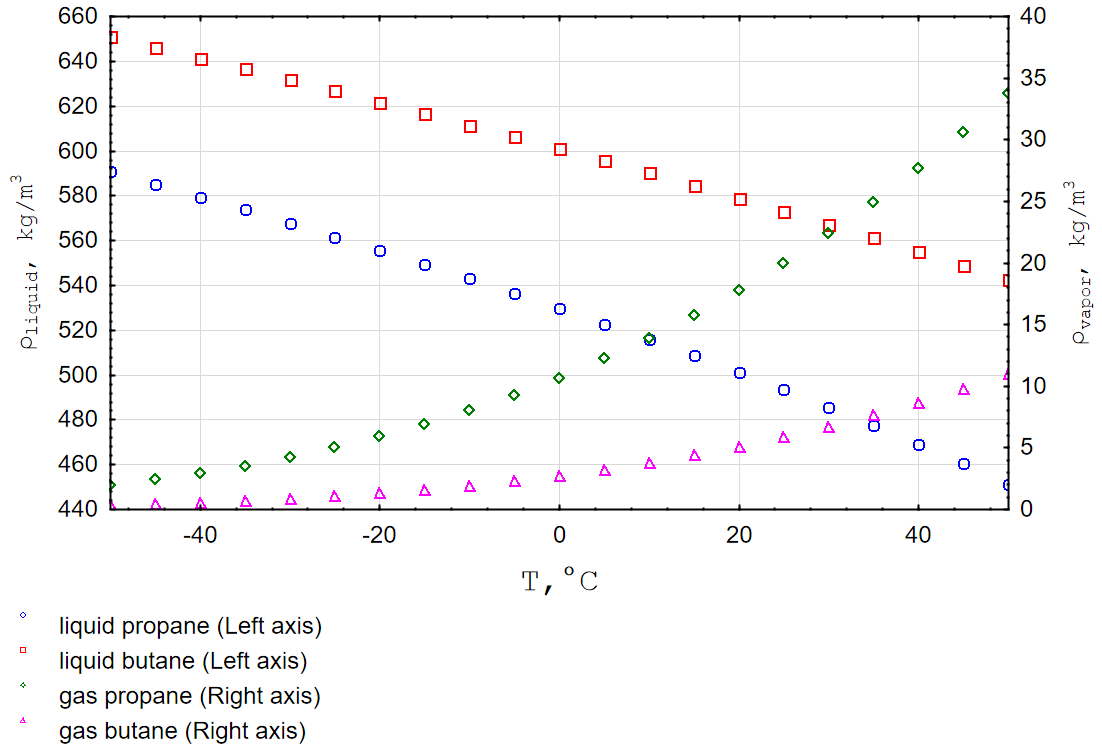
The data about butane density over a range of temperature [−50; +50] °C

== Vapor pressure of liquid ==
P in mm Hg	1	10	40	100	400	760	1520	3800	7600	15200	30400	45600
T in °C	–101.5	–77.8	–59.1	–44.2	–16.3	–0.5	18.8	50.0	79.5	116.0	—	—

n-Butane: Table data obtained from CRC Handbook of Chemistry and Physics 44th ed.

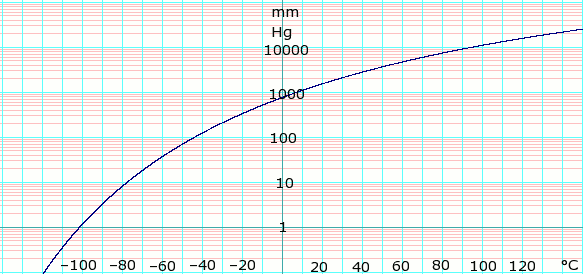
Vapor pressure of n-butane. From formula: $\scriptstyle \log_{10} P_{mmHg} = 6.83029 - \frac {945.90} {240.0+T}$ obtained from Lange's Handbook of Chemistry, 10th ed.

== Spectral data ==
UV-Vis
λ_{max}	? nm
Extinction coefficient, ε	?
IR
Major absorption bands	? cm^{−1}
NMR
Proton NMR
Carbon-13 NMR
Other NMR data
MS
Masses of main fragments
