= Boord olefin synthesis =

Reaction in organic chemistry

The Boord olefin synthesis is an organic reaction forming alkenes from ethers carrying a halogen atom 2 carbons removed from the oxygen atom (β-halo-ethers) using a metal such as magnesium or zinc. The reaction, discovered by Cecil E. Boord in 1930 is a classic named reaction with high yields and broad scope.

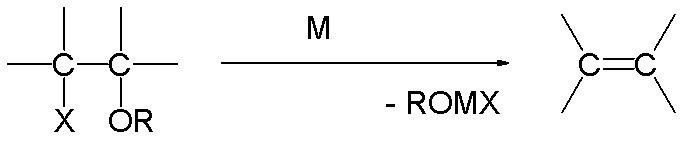

The reaction type is an elimination reaction with magnesium forming an intermediate Grignard reagent. The alkoxy group is a poor leaving group and therefore an E1cB elimination reaction mechanism is proposed. The original publication describes the organic synthesis of the compound isoheptene in several steps.

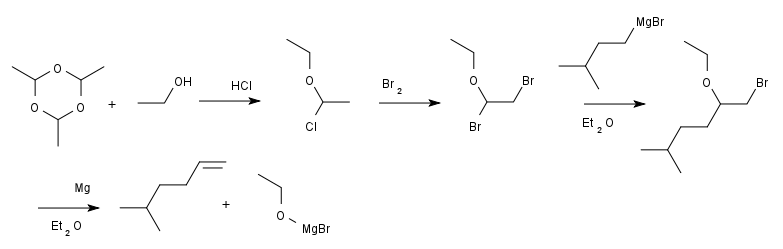

In a 1931 publication the scope is extended to 1,4-dienes with magnesium replaced by zinc (see also: Barbier reaction). In the first part of the reaction the allyl Grignard acts as a nucleophile in nucleophilic aliphatic substitution.

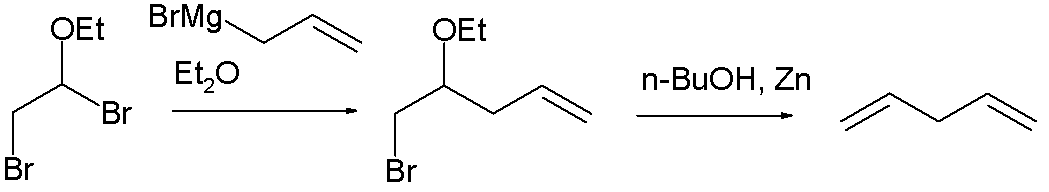
