= 2-Chlorobutane =

Structural formula of (R)-2-Chlorobutane
Structural formula of (S)-2-Chlorobutane

Names
- Preferred IUPAC name 2-Chlorobutane

Identifiers
CAS Number	78-86-4; 22157-31-9 (R); 22156-91-8 (S)
3D model (JSmol)	Interactive image; (R): Interactive image; (S): Interactive image
Abbreviations	2-CB s-CB; SCB s-BuCl sBuCl^{s}BuCl
ChEBI	CHEBI:166855
ChEMBL	ChEMBL346529
ChemSpider	6315; 19952591 (R); 552795 (S)
ECHA InfoCard	100.001.047
EC Number	201-151-7
PubChem CID	6563; 23616278 (R); 637146 (S)
UNII	AV999R2773; GRV78Y270O (R); 7DV15J668O (S)
CompTox Dashboard (EPA)	DTXSID9023966
- InChI: InChI=1S/C4H9Cl/c1-3-4(2)5/h4H,3H2,1-2H3 Key: BSPCSKHALVHRSR-UHFFFAOYSA-N; (R): InChI=1S/C4H9Cl/c1-3-4(2)5/h4H,3H2,1-2H3/t4-/m1/s1 Key: BSPCSKHALVHRSR-SCSAIBSYSA-N; (S): InChI=1S/C4H9Cl/c1-3-4(2)5/h4H,3H2,1-2H3/t4-/m0/s1 Key: BSPCSKHALVHRSR-BYPYZUCNSA-N
- SMILES: CCC(C)Cl; (R): C[C@@H](Cl)CC; (S): CC[C@H](C)Cl

Properties
Chemical formula	C_{4}H_{9}Cl
Molar mass	92.57 g·mol^{−1}
Density	0.873 g/cm^{−3}
Melting point	−140 °C (−220 °F; 133 K)
Boiling point	70 °C (158 °F; 343 K)
Magnetic susceptibility (χ)	−67.40·10^{−6} cm^{3}/mol

Hazards
- GHS labelling
Pictograms	(GHS02: Flammable) (GHS07: Exclamation mark)
Signal word	Danger
Hazard statements	H225, H315, H319, H335
Precautionary statements	P210, P233, P240, P241, P242, P243, P261, P264, P271, P280, P302+P352, P303+P361+P353, P304+P340, P305+P351+P338, P312, P321, P332+P313, P337+P313, P362, P370+P378, P403+P233, P403+P235, P405, P501
- Except where otherwise noted, data are given for materials in their standard state (at 25 °C [77 °F], 100 kPa). Infobox references

2-Chlorobutane is a compound with formula C_{4}H_{9}Cl or CH_{3}CHClCH_{2}CH_{3}. It is also called sec-butyl chloride. It is a colorless, volatile liquid at room temperature that is not miscible in water.

== Physical properties ==
It is a colorless, volatile liquid at room temperature that is not miscible in water. Being an alkyl chloride, its boiling point varies depending on what kind of halide is attached and where it is attached. The boiling points of chlorides are lower than bromides or iodides due to the small size of chlorine relative to other halogens, and its weaker intermolecular forces.

Despite its polarity, 2-chlorobutane is only slightly soluble in water due to the hydrocarbon chain its attached to, this makes it soluble in nonpolar-organic solvents. Like many alkyl halides, it is relativity reactive, although not as reactive as iodides and bromides (I>Br>Cl>F), because of this reactivity, alkyl fluorides are more stable than others, and are not readily reactive.

== Synthesis ==
2-Chlorobutane can be synthesized through the addition of hydrochloric acid to 2-butene in the following reaction:

The reaction is two-step, with the pi electrons attacking the chloride hydrogen, which forms a chloride nucleophile. In the second step, the nucleophile attacks the carbocation generated in the first step.

Although addition of a hydrogen halide to an alkene is stereoselective, the symmetrical structure of 2-butene prevents an anti-Marknikov product from forming due to both sides of the double bond having the same stability.

In addition, 2-chlorobutane can be synthesized in a substitution reaction by reacting 2-butanol with hydrochloric acid.

In this case, the reaction is S_{N}1 because 2-butanol generates a carbocation in a 2-step reaction. Because a hydroxyl group is not a good leaving group, it first attacks the chloride hydrogen, creating water, which is a good leaving group, this generates the carbocation. In the second step, the chloride nucleophile attacks the carbocation to form the product.

== Uses ==
2-Chlorobutane, along with other alkyl halides, is a useful intermediate in many different organic reactions. The halogen group is an effective leaving group, leading to its use in both elimination and substitution reactions. In addition, the compound is also a candidate for coupling reactions via a Grignard reagent.

=== Substitution reactions ===
In an S_{N}2 reaction, a nucleophile (iodine) attacks the partially positive carbon, which eliminates the chlorine. This occurs in one step.

A less favorable but still possible reaction is an S_{N}1 reaction, where a secondary carbocation is formed once the leaving group is removed. The nucleophile then attacks the carbocation, forming the product.

=== Elimination reactions ===
Additionally, because 2-chlorobutane is antiperiplanar, it can undergo E2 elimination reactions with strong bases. In it, the chlorine leaving group is removed, and the double bond is restored to yield different constitutional isomers. This is because 2-chlorobutane possesses two different sets of β-hydrogens at the first and third carbons respectively, resulting in 1-butene or 2-butene. As a secondary alkyl halide, both E2 and S_{N}2 reactions are equally likely when reacting with a substance that can act as both a base and a nucleophile. Which reaction occurs is dependent on the surrounding conditions. In an E2 mechanism, a strong base (e.g. sodium hydroxide) abstracts a beta hydrogen, causing the elections from the former carbon-hydrogen bond to re-form the double bond. This action removes the leaving group, converting 2-chlorobutane to 2-butene or 1-butene depending on which beta hydrogen is removed, because of Zaitsev's rule, the more stable 2-butene product is favored.

The mechanism for the formation of 2-butene (favored):

The mechanism for the formation of 1-butene (not favored):

=== Grignard reactions ===
As an alkyl halide, 2-chlorobutane can be used to prepare a Grignard reagent for use in forming a carbon-carbon bond. In the first step, a magnesium ion donates an electron to the alpha carbon in 2-chlorobutane, removing chlorine and forming an allyl radical as well as a magnesium radical. In the second step, the magnesium radical couples with the allyl radical while the chloride ion interacts with the magnesium ion.
