= Cecil E. Boord =

American chemist

- Born: June 29, 1884; Veedersburg, Indiana, United States
- Died: November 3, 1969 (aged 85); Columbus, Ohio, United States
- Education: Ohio State University
- Known for: Boord olefin synthesis
- Scientific career
- Thesis: Ortho Hydroxyazo Compounds (1912)
- Doctoral advisor: William McPherson

Cecil Ernest Boord (June 29, 1884 – November 3, 1969) was an American chemist.

He graduated in 1907 from Wabash College and joined Ohio State University. He earned the titles of "dean of hydrocarbon chemistry" and "designer and builder of gasolines" through his years of pioneering research in the syntheses and testing of hydrocarbon components of gasoline. In 1955, Dr. Boord was awarded the prized Joseph Sullivant Medal in recognition of "notable achievement" in the arts and sciences by an alumnus or faculty member of Ohio State.

The Boord olefin synthesis, a reaction he discovered in 1930, is named after him. It is a classic named reaction with high yields and broad scope.

He wrote the chapter on aliphatic compounds in the 1933 Annual Survey of American Chemistry published for the National Research Council.
