= Grignard reagent =

Organometallic compounds used in organic synthesis

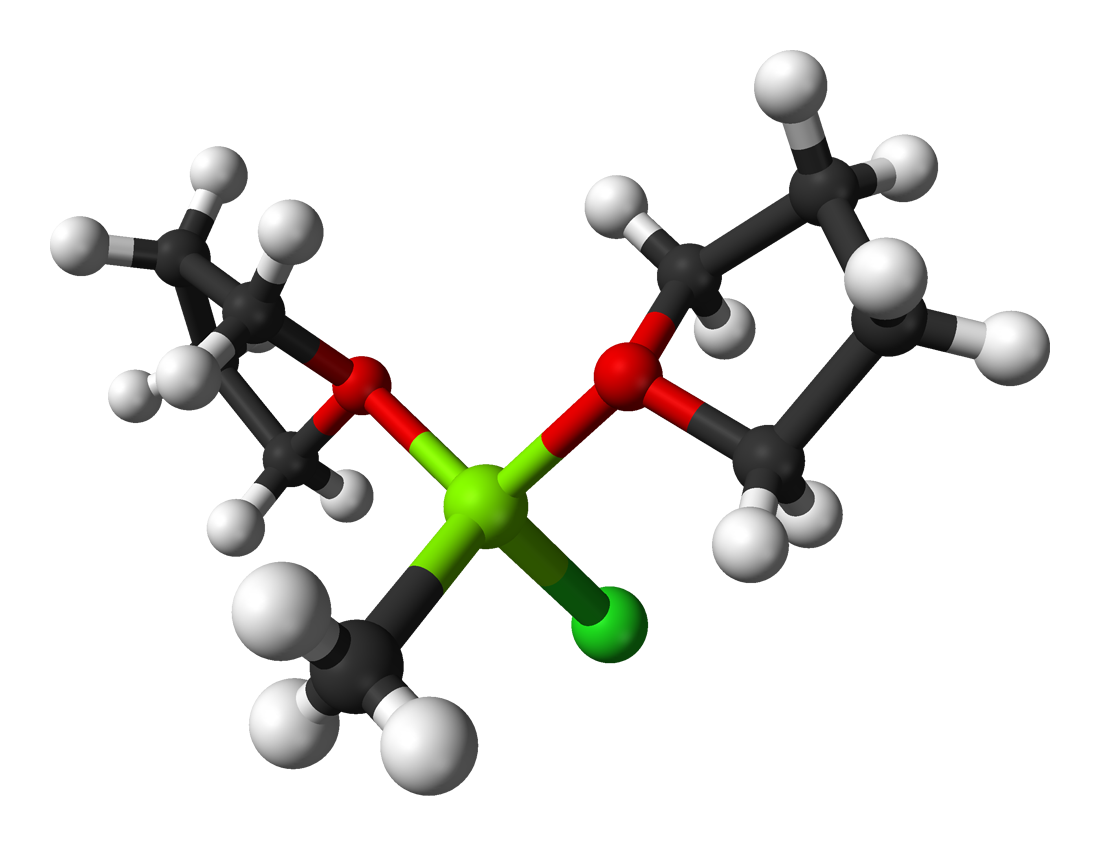
Usually Grignard reagents are written as R-Mg-X, but in fact the magnesium(II) centre is tetrahedral when dissolved in Lewis basic solvents, as shown here for the bis-adduct of methylmagnesium chloride and THF.

Grignard reagents or Grignard compounds are chemical compounds with the general formula RMgX(S)_{n}, where X is a halide, R is an organic group (normally an alkyl or aryl), S is an ether, and n is usually 2. Usually, the ether groups are omitted from the formula. Thus, two typical examples are methylmagnesium chloride ClMgCH_{3} and phenylmagnesium bromide C_{6}H_{5}MgBr. They are a subclass of the organomagnesium compounds.

Grignard compounds are popular reagents in organic synthesis for creating new carbon–carbon bonds. The carbon-magnesium bond in Grignard reagent is a polar covalent bond. The carbon atom has negative excess charge and acts as a nucleophile.

Grignard reagents are rarely isolated as solids. Instead, they are normally handled as solutions in solvents such as diethyl ether or tetrahydrofuran using air-free techniques. Grignard reagents are complexes with the magnesium atom bonded to two ether ligands as well as the halide and organyl ligands.

The discovery of the Grignard reaction in 1900 was recognized with the Nobel Prize awarded to Victor Grignard in 1912.

== Synthesis ==
=== From Mg metal ===
Traditionally Grignard reagents are prepared by treating an organic halide (normally organobromine) with magnesium metal. Ethers are required to stabilize the organomagnesium compound. Water and air, which rapidly destroy the reagent by protonolysis or oxidation, are excluded. Although the reagents still need to be dry, ultrasound can allow Grignard reagents to form in wet solvents by activating the magnesium such that it consumes the water.

As is common for reactions involving solids and solution, the formation of Grignard reagents is often subject to an induction period. During this stage, the passivating oxide on the magnesium is removed. After this induction period, the reactions can be highly exothermic. This exothermicity must be considered when a reaction is scaled-up from laboratory to production plant. Most organohalides will work, but carbon-fluorine bonds are generally unreactive, except with specially activated magnesium (through Rieke metals).

==== Magnesium ====
Typically the reaction to form Grignard reagents involves the use of magnesium ribbon. All magnesium is coated with a passivating layer of magnesium oxide, which inhibits reactions with the organic halide. Many methods have been developed to weaken this passivating layer, thereby exposing highly reactive magnesium to the organic halide. Mechanical methods include crushing of the Mg pieces in situ, rapid stirring, and sonication. Iodine, methyl iodide, and 1,2-dibromoethane are common activating agents. The use of 1,2-dibromoethane is advantageous as its action can be monitored by the observation of bubbles of ethylene. Furthermore, the side-products are innocuous:

Mg + BrC_{2}H_{4}Br → C_{2}H_{4} + MgBr_{2}

The amount of Mg consumed by these activating agents is usually insignificant. When treated with small amounts of mercuric chloride, magnesium pieces become coated with an amalgam, enhancing its reactivity.

Activated magnesium, such as Rieke magnesium, circumvents this problem. The oxide layer can also be broken up using ultrasound, using a stirring rod to scratch the oxidized layer off, or by adding a few drops of iodine or 1,2-Diiodoethane. Another option is to use sublimed magnesium or magnesium anthracene.

"Rieke magnesium" is prepared by a reduction of anhydrous magnesium chloride with potassium:

MgCl_{2} + 2 K → Mg + 2 KCl

==== Mechanism ====
In terms of mechanism, the reaction proceeds through single electron transfer:

$$\begin{align}
\ce{R-X {}+ Mg} &\longrightarrow  \ce{[R-X^\bullet]^- {}+ [Mg^\bullet]+} \\
\ce{[R-X^\bullet]-} &\longrightarrow \ce{R^\bullet {}+ X-} \\
\ce{R^\bullet {}+ [Mg^\bullet]+} &\longrightarrow \ce{R-Mg+} \\
\ce{R-Mg+ {}+ X-} &\longrightarrow \ce{R-MgX}
\end{align}$$

=== Mg transfer reaction (halogen–Mg exchange) ===
An alternative preparation of Grignard reagents involves transfer of Mg from a preformed Grignard reagent to an organic halide. Other organomagnesium reagents are used as well. This method offers the advantage that the Mg transfer tolerates many functional groups. An illustrative reaction involves isopropylmagnesium chloride and aryl bromide or iodides:

i-PrMgCl + ArBr → i-PrCl + ArMgBr

=== From alkylzinc compounds (reductive transmetalation) ===
A further method to synthesize Grignard reagents involves reaction of Mg with an organozinc compound. This method has been used to make adamantane-based Grignard reagents, which are, due to C-C coupling side reactions, difficult to make by the conventional method from the alkyl halide and Mg. The reductive transmetalation achieves:

AdZnBr + Mg → AdMgBr + Zn

=== Organomagnesium fluorides ===
Grignard reagents with chloride, bromide, and iodide are routine reagents. The corresponding fluorides (RMgF) were not synthesized until 1970. A reduction of amyl fluoride to the corresponding hydrocarbon with activated magnesium was reported in 1920, although no intermediates were identified. Alkylmagnesium fluorides were first prepared in 1970, using magnesium, catalytic iodine, and the alkyl fluoride in refluxing tetrahydrofuran or 1,2-dimethoxyethane.

== Testing Grignard reagents ==
Because Grignard reagents are so sensitive to moisture and oxygen, many methods have been developed to test the quality of a batch. Typical tests involve titrations with weighable, anhydrous protic reagents, e.g. menthol in the presence of a color-indicator. The interaction of the Grignard reagent with phenanthroline or 2,2'-biquinoline causes a color change.

== Reactions of Grignard reagents ==
Grignard reagent reactions
Named after	Victor Grignard
Reaction type	Coupling reaction

Reaction
Carbon electrophiles
+
R-MgX
+
(H_{3}O^{+})
↓
Coupling Product

=== As nucleophiles ===
Grignard reagents react with a variety of carbonyl derivatives.

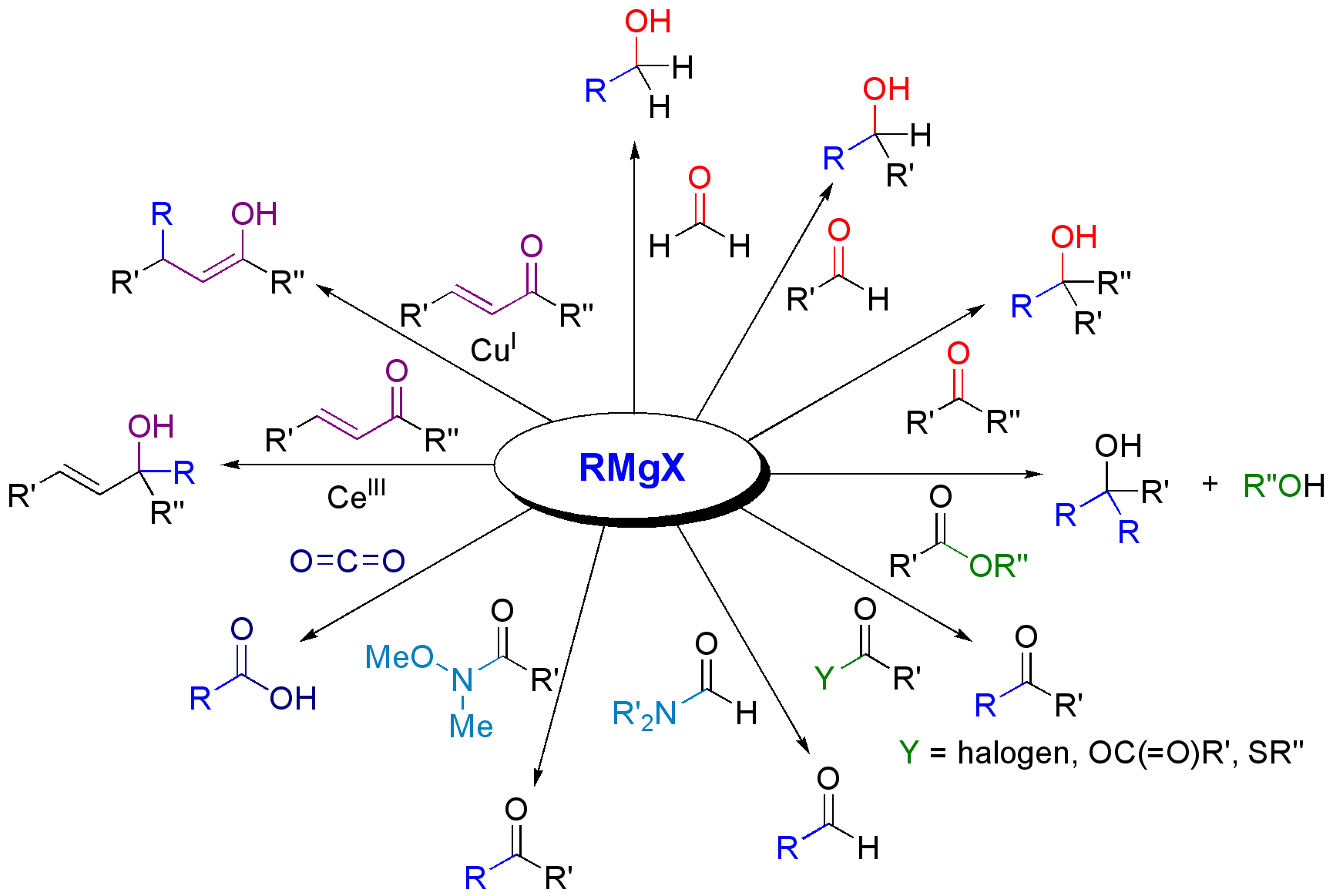
Reactions of Grignard reagents with carbonyls

Such reactions usually involve an aqueous acidic workup, though this step is rarely shown in reaction schemes.

The most common application of Grignard reagents is the alkylation of aldehydes and ketones, i.e. the Grignard reaction:

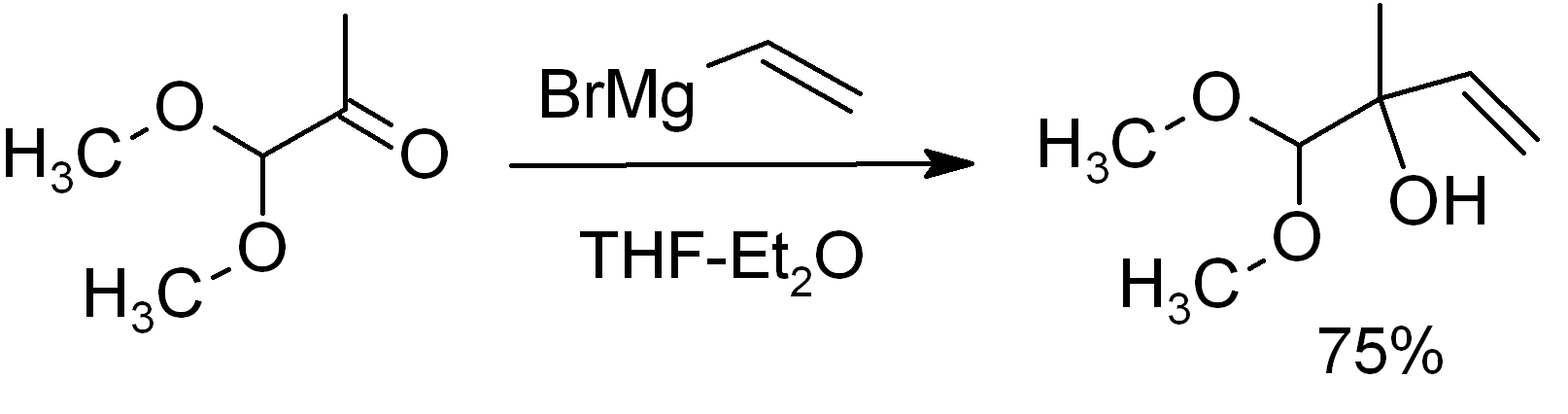
Reaction of CH_{3}C(=O)CH(OCH_{3})_{2} with H_{2}C=CHMgBr

Note that the acetal functional group (a protected carbonyl) does not react.

Grignard reagents also react with many "carbonyl-like" electrophiles:

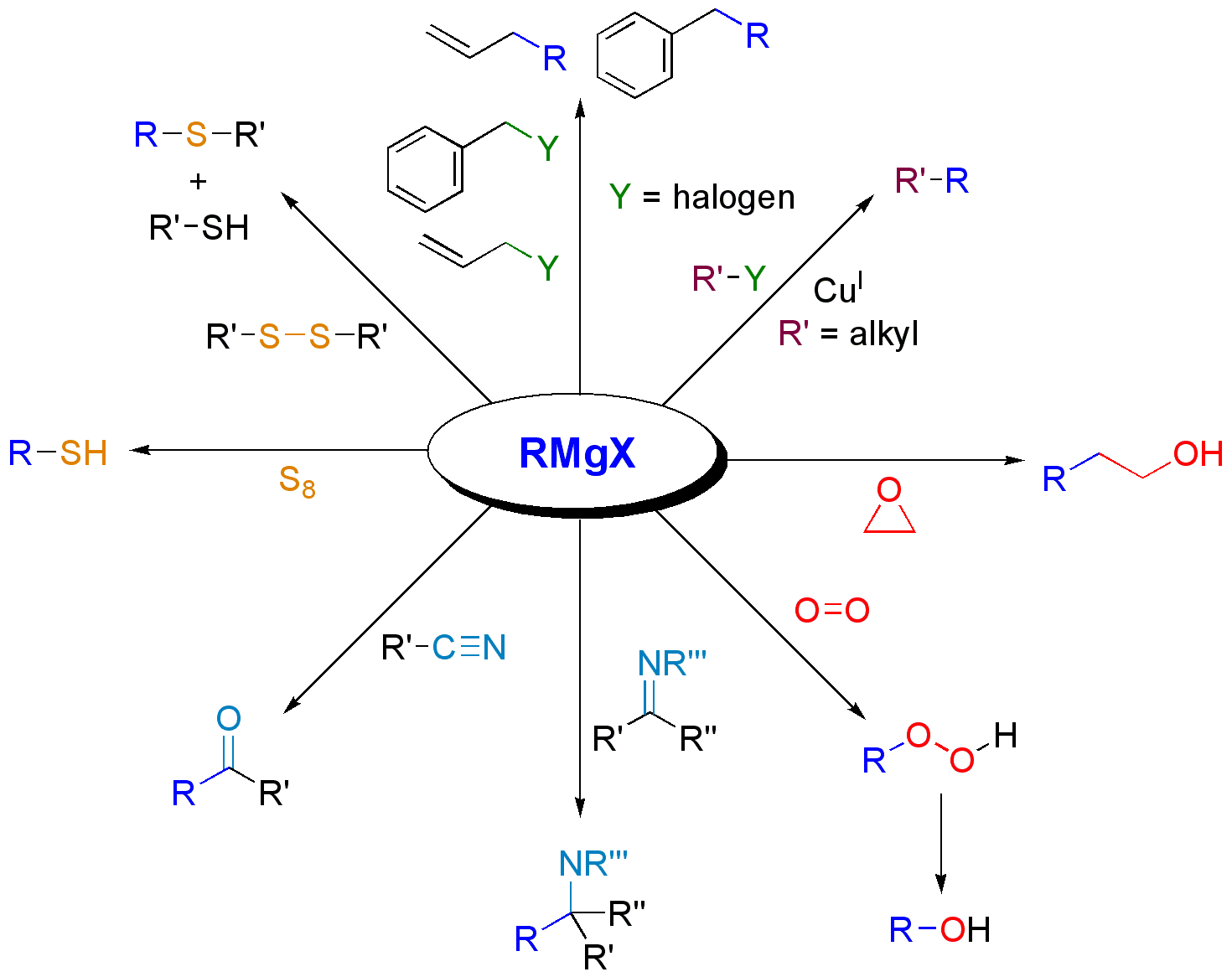
Reactions of Grignard reagents with various electrophiles

Compounds with labile protons are unsuitable electrophiles, because Grignard reagents are strong bases, and protonative quenching occurs much faster than addition.

Grignard reagents are nucleophiles in nucleophilic aliphatic substitutions for instance with alkyl halides in a key step in industrial Naproxen production:

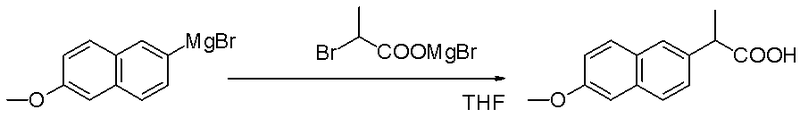
Naproxen synthesis

=== Reactions as a base ===
Grignard reagents are basic and react with alcohols, phenols, etc. to give alkoxides (ROMgBr). 1,3-Diketones and related substrates are also acidic enough that the Grignard reagent RMgX functions merely as a base, liberating the alkane RH to give a magnesium enolate.

=== Alkylation of metals and metalloids ===
Like organolithium compounds, Grignard reagents usefully form carbon–heteroatom bonds with many metal-based electrophiles.
$$\begin{matrix}
\ce{R4B-}\\
{\color{White}\scriptstyle\ce{Et2O.BF3\ or\ NaBF4}}\Bigg\uparrow\scriptstyle\ce{Et2O.BF3\ or\ NaBF4}\\
\ce{Ph2PR <-[\ce{Ph2PCl}] RMgX ->[\ce{Bu3SnCl}] Bu3SnR}\\
{\color{White}\scriptstyle\ce{B(OMe)3}}\Bigg\downarrow\scriptstyle\ce{B(OMe)3}\\
\ce{RB(OMe)2}
\end{matrix}$$
For example, they undergo transmetallation with cadmium chloride (CdCl_{2}) to give dialkylcadmium:

2 RMgX + CdCl_{2} → R_{2}Cd + 2 Mg(X)Cl

=== Schlenk equilibrium ===
Most Grignard reactions are conducted in ethereal solvents, especially diethyl ether and THF. Grignard reagents react with 1,4-dioxane to give the diorganomagnesium compounds and insoluble coordination polymer MgX_{2}(dioxane)_{2} and (R = organic group, X = halide):

2 RMgX + dioxane ⇌ R_{2}Mg + MgX_{2}(dioxane)_{2}

This reaction exploits the Schlenk equilibrium, driving it toward the right.

=== Precursors to magnesiates ===
Grignard reagents react with organolithium compounds to give ate complexes (Bu = butyl):

BuMgBr + 3 BuLi → LiMgBu_{3} + BuBr

=== Coupling with organic halides ===
Grignard reagents do not typically react with organic halides, in contrast with their high reactivity with other main group halides. In the presence of metal catalysts, however, Grignard reagents participate in C-C coupling reactions. For example, nonylmagnesium bromide reacts with methyl p-chlorobenzoate to give p-nonylbenzoic acid, in the presence of Tris(acetylacetonato)iron(III) (Fe(acac)_{3}), after workup with NaOH to hydrolyze the ester, shown as follows. Without the Fe(acac)_{3}, the Grignard reagent would attack the ester group over the aryl halide.

4-nonylbenzoicacid synthesis using a grignard reagent

For the coupling of aryl halides with aryl Grignard reagents, nickel chloride in tetrahydrofuran (THF) is also a good catalyst. Additionally, an effective catalyst for the couplings of alkyl halides is the Gilman catalyst lithium tetrachlorocuprate (Li_{2}CuCl_{4}), prepared by mixing lithium chloride (LiCl) and copper(II) chloride (CuCl_{2}) in THF. The Kumada-Corriu coupling gives access to (substituted) styrenes.

=== Oxidation ===
Treatment of a Grignard reagent with oxygen gives the magnesium organoperoxide. Hydrolysis of this material yields hydroperoxides or alcohol. These reactions involve radical intermediates.

$$\begin{array}{lcrll}
\ce{{R-MgX} + O2 ->}\ {\color{Red}\ce{R^{\bullet} {}+ [O2^\bullet]-}} + \ce{MgX+ ->} & \ce{R-O-O-MgX} & {\color{Gray}+\ \ce{H3O+}} & \ce{-> {R-O-O-H}} &{\color{Gray}+\ \ce{{HO-MgX} + H+}}\\
& \Bigg\downarrow \ce{R-MgX} \\
& \ce{R-O-MgX} & {\color{Gray}+\ \ce{H3O+}} &\ce{-> {R-O-H}} &{\color{Gray}+\ \ce{{HO-MgX} + H+}}\\
\end{array}$$

The simple oxidation of Grignard reagents to give alcohols is of little practical importance as yields are generally poor. Oxidations of Grignard reagents with oxygen (O_{2}) in presence of an alkene can give an ethylene-extended alcohol. This modification requires aryl or vinyl Grignard reagents. The Grignard and the alkene do not react, demonstrating that oxygen is essential for the coupling. One drawback to this procedure is the requirement of at least two equivalents of Grignard although this can partly be circumvented by the use of a dual Grignard system with a cheap reducing Grignard such as n-butylmagnesium bromide.

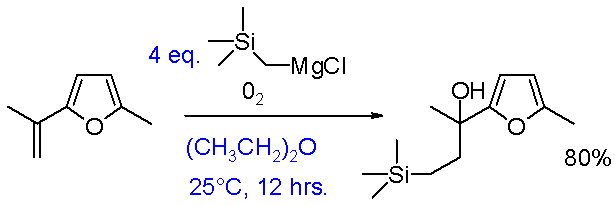
Grignard oxygen oxidation example

=== Elimination ===
In the Boord olefin synthesis, the addition of magnesium to certain β-haloethers results in an elimination reaction to the alkene. This reaction can limit the utility of Grignard reactions.

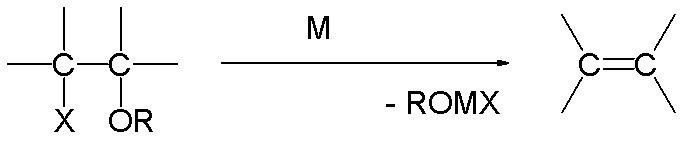
Boord olefin synthesis, X = Br, I, M = Mg, Zn

=== Allyl Grignard reagents ===
Allyl Grignard reagents exhibit high reactivity and special selectivity compared to alkyl ones.

== Industrial use ==
An example of the Grignard reaction is a key step in the (non-stereoselective) industrial production of Tamoxifen (currently used for the treatment of estrogen receptor positive breast cancer in women):

Tamoxifen production

== See also ==
- Dibutylmagnesium
- Hauser base

== Gallery ==
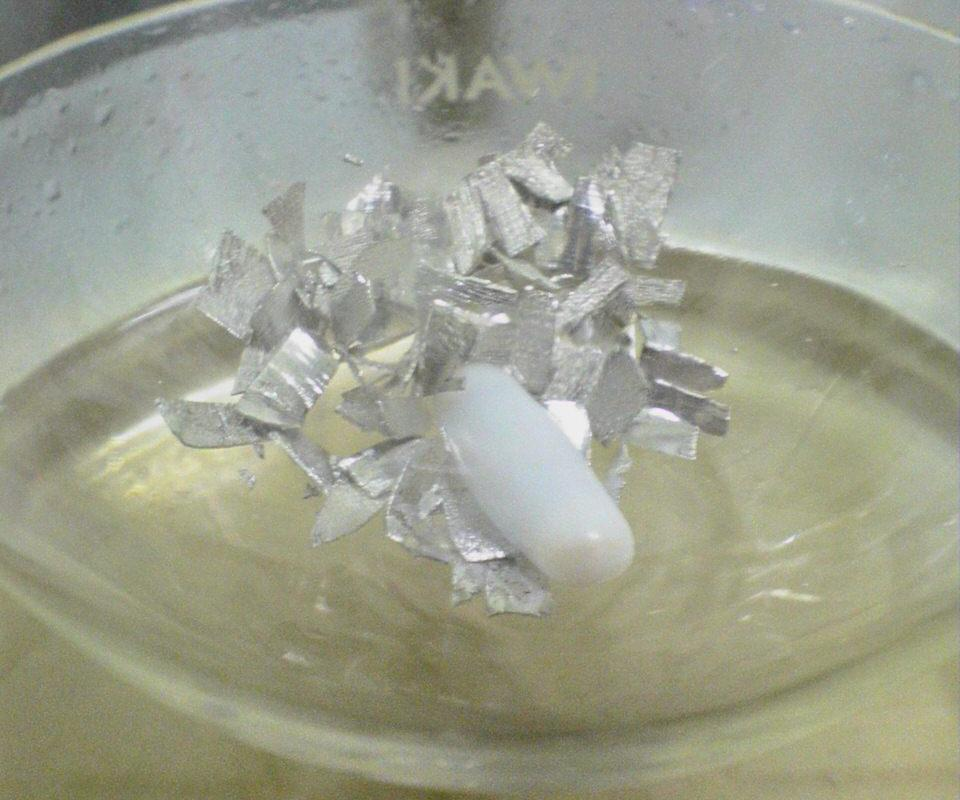
Magnesium turnings are placed in a flask.

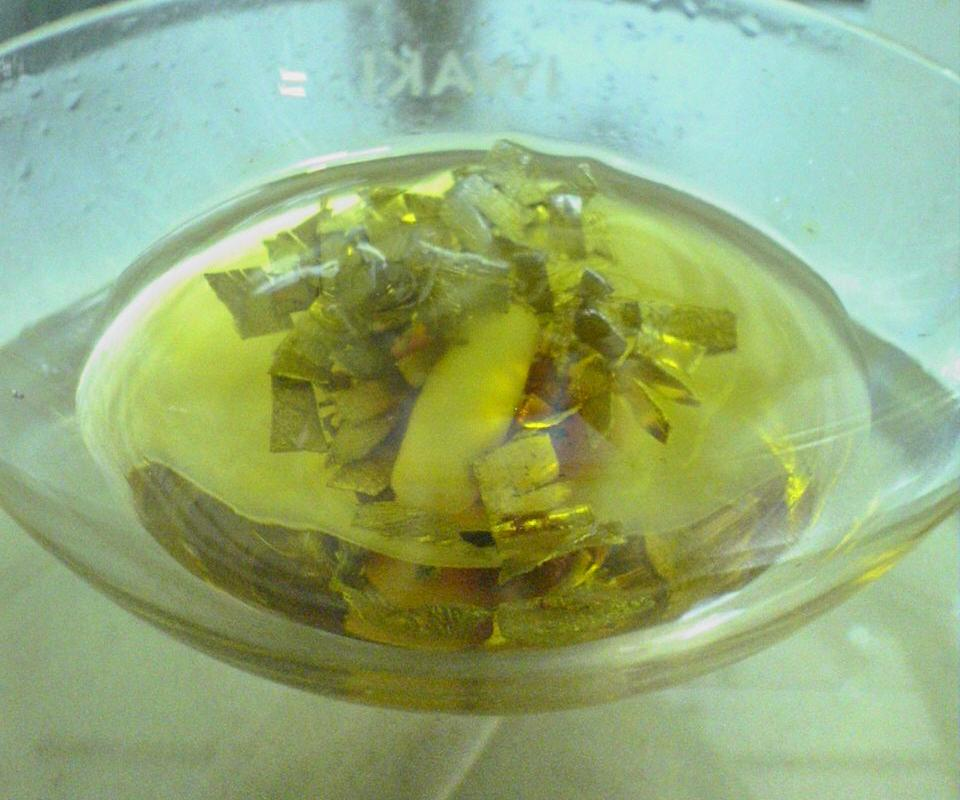
Tetrahydrofuran and a small piece of iodine are added.

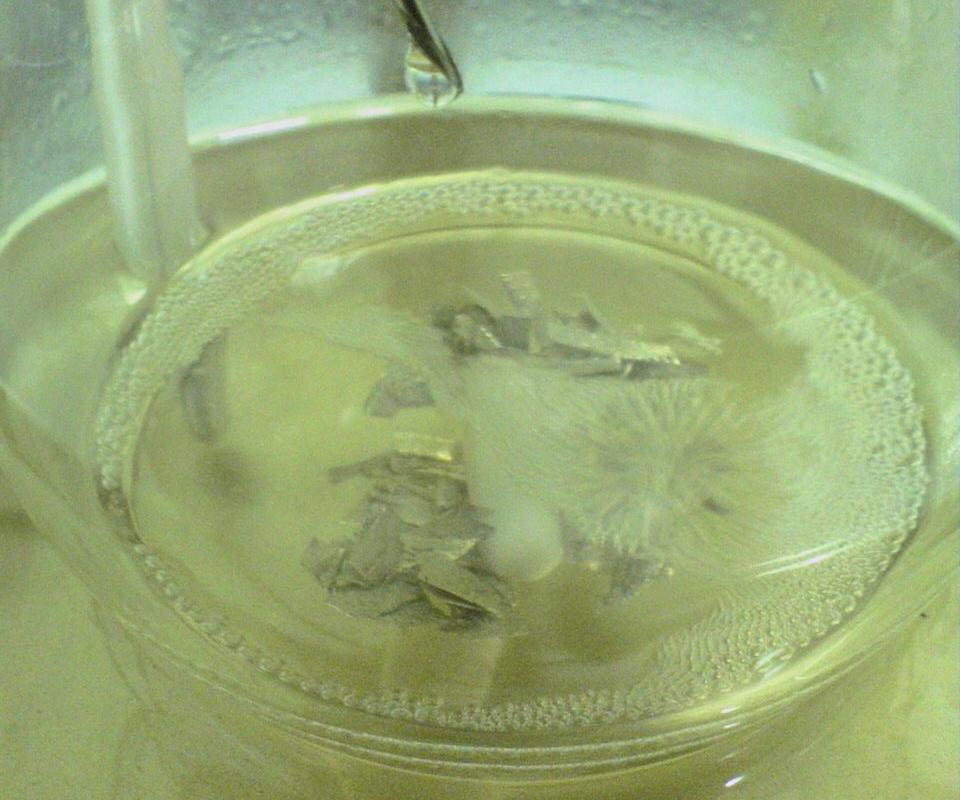
A solution of alkyl bromide is added while heating.

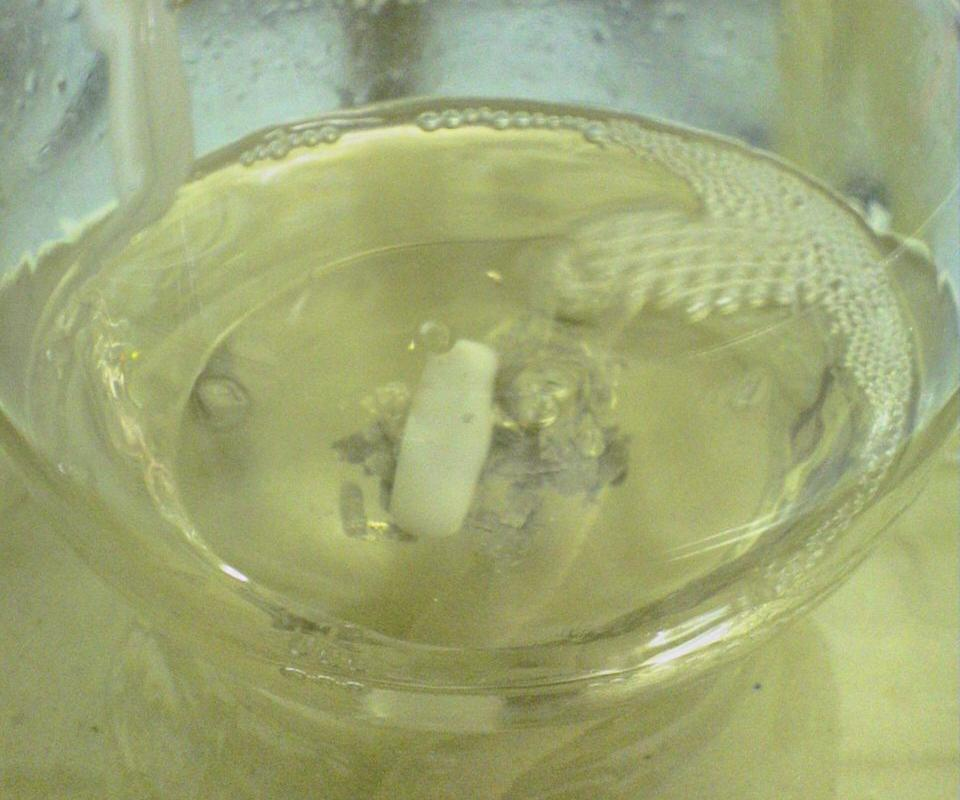
After completion of the addition, the mixture is heated for a while.

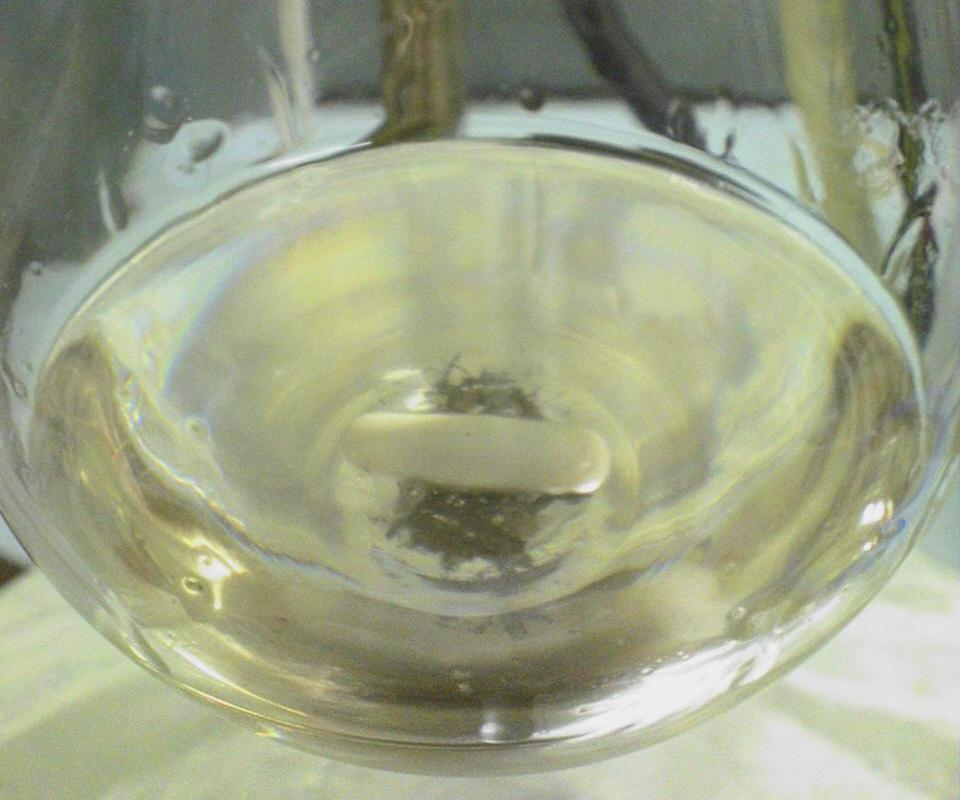
Formation of the Grignard reagent is complete. A small amount of magnesium still remains in the flask.

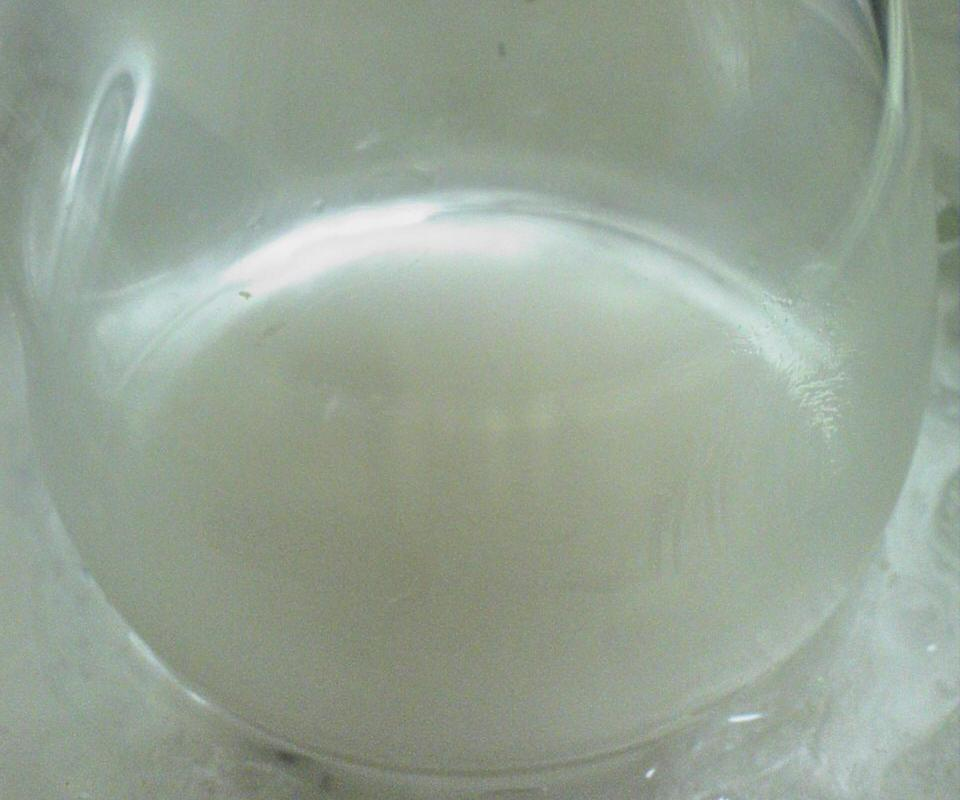
The Grignard reagent thus prepared is cooled to 0°C before the addition of the carbonyl compound. The solution becomes cloudy as the Precipitation.

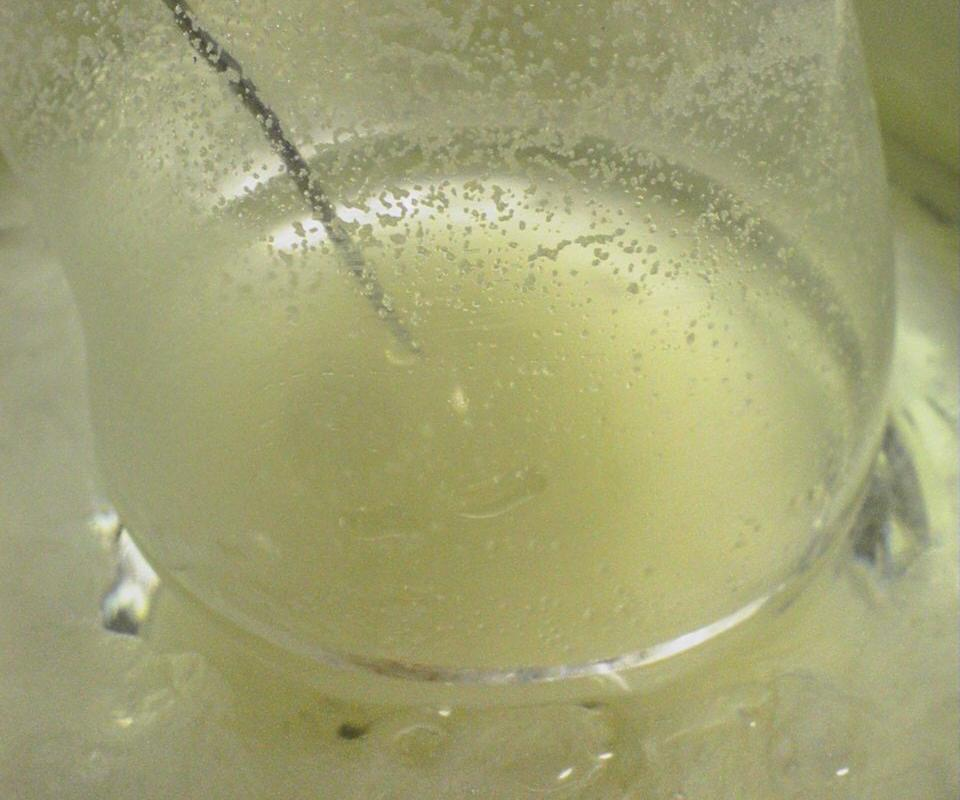
A solution of carbonyl compound is added to the Grignard reagent.

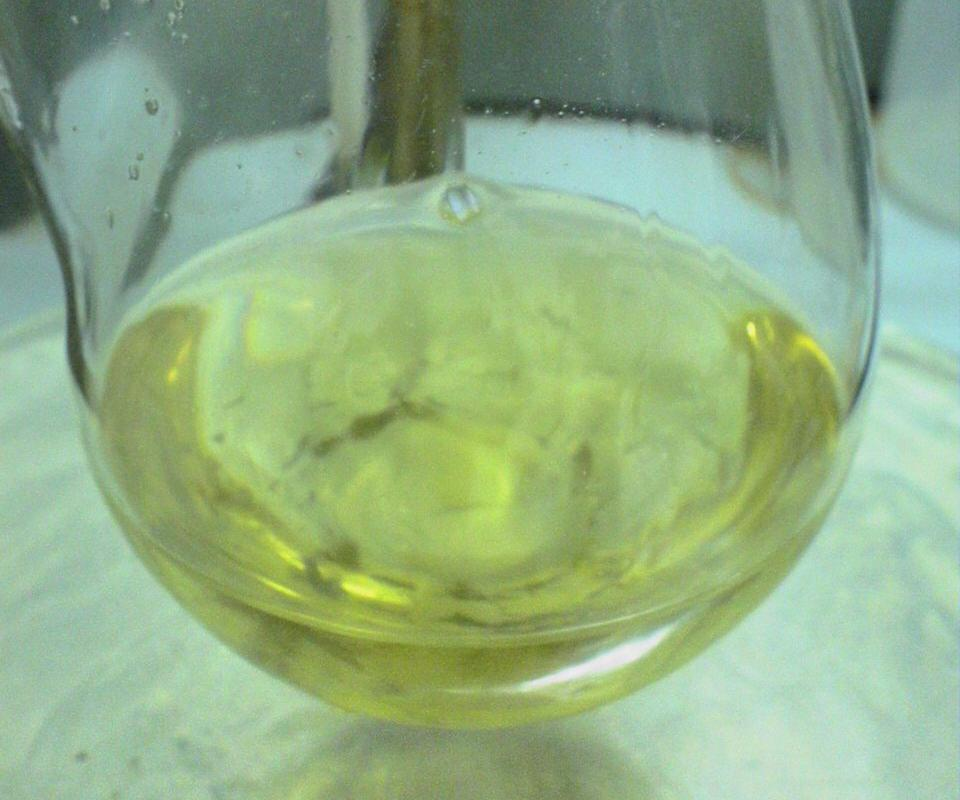
The solution is warmed to room temperature. At this point the reaction is complete.

== Specialized literature ==
- Rogers, H. R.; Hill, C. L.; Fujiwara, Y.; Rogers, R. J.; Mitchell, H. L.; Whitesides, G. M. (1980). "Mechanism of formation of Grignard reagents. Kinetics of reaction of alkyl halides in diethyl ether with magnesium". Journal of the American Chemical Society. 102 (1): 217. Bibcode:1980JAChS.102..217R. doi:10.1021/ja00521a034.
- De Boer, H.J.R.; Akkerman, O.S; Bickelhaupt, F. (1988). "Carbanions as intermediates in the synthesis of Grignard Reagents". Angew. Chem. Int. Ed. 27 (5): 687–89. doi:10.1002/anie.198806871.
- Van Klink, G.P.M.; de Boer, H.J.R; Schat, G.; Akkerman, O.S.; Bickelhaupt, F.; Spek, A. (2002). "Carbanions as Intermediates in the Formation of Grignard Reagents". Organometallics. 21 (10): 2119–35. doi:10.1021/om011083a. hdl:1874/14334. S2CID 94556915.
- Shao, Y.; Liu, Z.; Huang, P.; Liu, B. (2018). "A unified model of Grignard reagent formation". Physical Chemistry Chemical Physics. 20 (16): 11100–08. Bibcode:2018PCCP...2011100S. doi:10.1039/c8cp01031e. PMID 29620768.
