= Schlenk equilibrium =

Type of chemical equilibrium

The Schlenk equilibrium, named after its discoverer Wilhelm Schlenk, is a chemical equilibrium taking place in solutions of Grignard reagents and Hauser bases

2 RMgX ⇌ MgX_{2} + MgR_{2}

The process described is an equilibrium between two equivalents of an alkyl or aryl magnesium halide on the left of the equation and one equivalent each of the dialkyl or diaryl magnesium compound and magnesium halide salt on the right. Organomagnesium halides in solution also form dimers and higher oligomers, especially at high concentration. Alkyl magnesium chlorides in ether are present as dimers.

The position of the equilibrium is influenced by solvent, temperature, and the nature of the various substituents. It is known that magnesium center in Grignard reagents typically coordinates two molecules of ether such as diethyl ether or tetrahydrofuran (THF). Thus they are more precisely described as having the formula RMgXL_{2} where L = an ether. In the presence of monoethers, the equilibrium typically favors the alkyl- or arylmagnesium halide. Addition of dioxane to such solutions, however, leads to precipitation of the coordination polymers MgX_{2}(μ-dioxane)_{2}, driving the equilibrium completely to the right. The dialkylmagnesium compounds are popular in the synthesis of organometallic compounds.
