= Dibutylmagnesium =

Names
- Other names Di-n-butylmagnesium

Identifiers
CAS Number	1191-47-5
3D model (JSmol)	Interactive image
ChemSpider	10659503
ECHA InfoCard	100.013.397
EC Number	214-736-7
PubChem CID	70929
CompTox Dashboard (EPA)	DTXSID9061590
- InChI: InChI=1S/2C4H9.Mg/c2*1-3-4-2;/h2*1,3-4H2,2H3;/q2*-1;+2 Key: KJJBSBKRXUVBMX-UHFFFAOYSA-N
- SMILES: CCC[CH2-].CCC[CH2-].[Mg+2]

Properties
Chemical formula	(CH_{3}CH_{2}CH_{2}CH_{2})_{2}Mg
Molar mass	138.537 g·mol^{−1}
Appearance	Waxy white solid
Density	0.713 g/mL at 25°C
Solubility in water	Reacts with water

Hazards
- GHS labelling
Pictograms	(GHS02: Flammable) (GHS05: Corrosive) (GHS07: Exclamation mark) (GHS08: Health hazard) (GHS09: Environmental hazard)
Signal word	Danger
Hazard statements	H250, H260, H314
Precautionary statements	P210, P222, P223, P231+P232, P260, P264, P280, P301+P330+P331, P302+P334, P303+P361+P353, P304+P340, P305+P351+P338, P310, P321, P335+P334, P370+P378, P402+P404, P405, P422, P501

Related compounds
Related compounds	Dimethylmagnesium
- Except where otherwise noted, data are given for materials in their standard state (at 25 °C [77 °F], 100 kPa). Infobox references

Dibutylmagnesium is an organometallic chemical compound of magnesium. Its chemical formula is (CH_{3}CH_{2}CH_{2}CH_{2})_{2}Mg. Dibutylmagnesium is a chemical compound from the group of organomagnesium compounds. The pure substance is a waxy solid. Commercially, it is marketed as a solution in heptane.

== Synthesis ==
Dibutylmagnesium can be obtained by the reaction of butyllithium with butylmagnesium chloride and the subsequent addition of magnesium 2-ethylhexanoate. The compound can also be prepared by hydrogenation of magnesium, followed by a reaction with 1-butene. It is also possible to prepare dibutylmagnesium using 2-chlorobutane, magnesium powder, and n-butyllithium.

== Use ==
Dibutylmagnesium is used as a convenient reagent for the preparation of organomagnesium compounds.
