= Group 2 organometallic chemistry =

Branch of chemistry

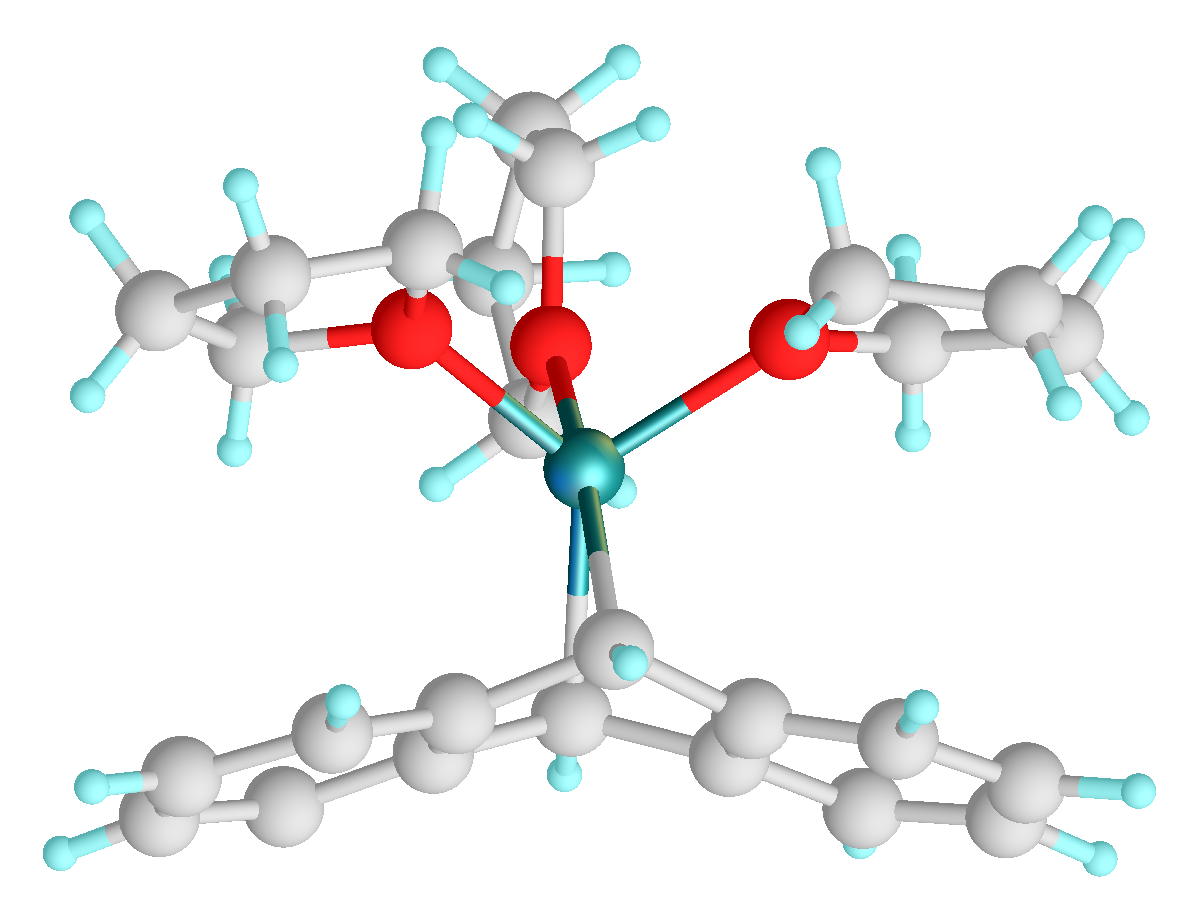
Magnesium anthracenide with three thf ligands.

Group 2 organometallic chemistry refers to the organic derivativess of any group 2 element. It is a subtheme to main group organometallic chemistry. By far the most common group 2 organometallic compounds are the magnesium-containing Grignard reagents which are widely used in organic chemistry. Other organometallic group 2 compounds are typically limited to academic interests.

== Characteristics ==
As the group 2 elements (also referred to as the alkaline earth metals) contain two valence electrons, their chemistries have similarities group 12 organometallic compounds. Both readily assume a +2 oxidation states with higher and lower states being rare, and are less electronegative than carbon. However, as the group two elements (with the exception of beryllium) have considerably low electronegativity the resulting C-M bonds are more highly polarized and ionic-like, if not entirely ionic for the heavier barium compounds. The lighter organoberyllium and organomagnesium compounds are often considered covalent, but with some ionic bond characteristics owing to the attached carbon bearing a negative dipole moment. This higher ionic character and bond polarization tends to produce high coordination numbers and many compounds (particularly dialklys) are polymeric in solid or liquid states with highly complex structures in solution, though in the gaseous state they are often monomeric.

Metallocene compounds with group 2 elements are rare, but some do exist. Bis(cyclopentadienyl)beryllium or beryllocene (Cp_{2}Be), with a molecular dipole moment of 2.2 D, is so-called slipped ^{5}η/^{1}η sandwich. While magnesocene (Cp_{2}Mg) is a regular metallocene, bis(pentamethylcyclopentadienyl)calcium (Cp^{*})_{2}Ca is bent with an angle of 147°.

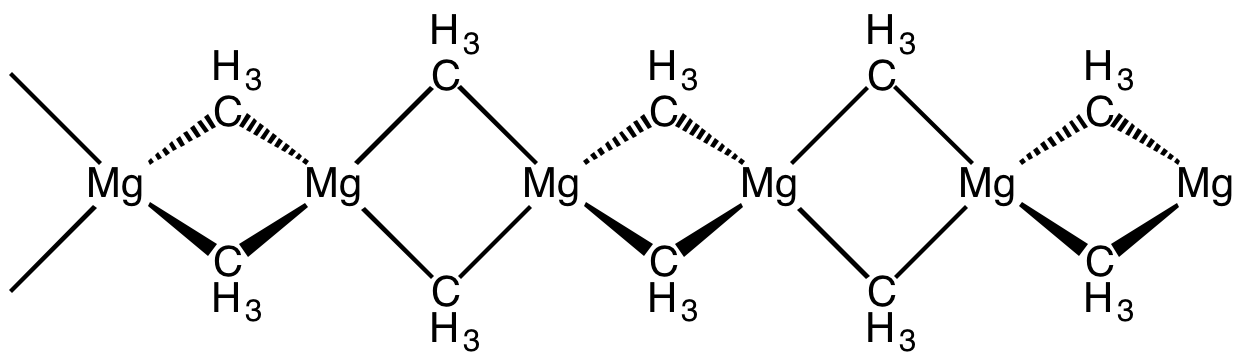
Dimethylmagnesium is a polymer built up from 3-center, 2-electron bonded bridging methyl groups. Dimethylberyllium adopts the same structure.

== Synthesis ==
Mixed alkyl/aryl-halide compounds, which contain a single C-M bond and a C-X bond, are typically prepared by oxidative addition. Magnesium-containing compounds of this configuration are known as the Grignard reagents, though some calcium Grignard's are known and more reactive and sensitive to decomposition. Calcium grignard's must be pre-activated prior to synthesis.

There are three key reaction pathways for dialkyl and diaryl group 2 metal compounds.

- metathesis:

MX_{2} + R-Y → MR_{2} + Y-X'

- transmetallation:

M'R_{2} + M → MR_{2} + M'

- via the Schlenk equilibrium:

2 RMX → MR_{2} + MX_{2}

== Compounds ==
Although organomagnesium compounds are widespread in the form of Grignard reagents, the other organo-group 2 compound are almost exclusively of academic interest. Organoberyllium chemistry is limited due to the cost and toxicity of beryllium. Calcium is nontoxic and cheap but organocalcium compounds are difficult to prepare, strontium and barium compounds even more so. One use for these types of compounds is in chemical vapor deposition.

=== Organoberyllium ===
Beryllium derivatives and reagents are often prepared by alkylation of beryllium chloride. Examples of known organoberyllium compounds are dineopentylberyllium, beryllocene (Cp_{2}Be), diallylberyllium (by exchange reaction of diethyl beryllium with triallyl boron), bis(1,3-trimethylsilylallyl)beryllium and Be(mes)2. Ligands can also be aryls and alkynyls.

=== Organomagnesium ===
The distinctive feature of the Grignard reagents is their formation from the organic halide and magnesium metal. Most other group II organic compounds are generated by salt metathesis, which limits their accessibility. The formation of the Grignard reagents has received intense scrutiny. It proceeds by a SET process. For less reactive organic halides, activated forms of magnesium have been produced in the form of Rieke magnesium. Examples of Grignard reagents are phenylmagnesium bromide and ethylmagnesium bromide. These simplified formulas are deceptive: Grignard reagents generally exist as dietherates, RMgX(ether)2. As such they obey the octet rule.

Grignard reagents participate in the Schlenk equilibrium. Exploiting this reaction is a way to generate dimethylmagnesium. Beyond Grignard reagents, another organomagnesium compound is magnesium anthracene. This orange solid is used as a source of highly active magnesium. Butadiene-magnesium serves as a source for the butadiene dianion. Ate complexes of magnesium are also well known, e.g LiMgBu_{3}.

=== Organocalcium ===
Dimethylcalcium is obtained by metathesis reaction of calcium bis(trimethylsilyl)amide and methyllithium in diethyl ether:

$$\mathrm{Ca[N\{Si(CH_3 )_3\}_2]_2 + 2\ LiCH_3 \longrightarrow Ca(CH_3)_2 + 2\ Li[N\{Si(CH_3)_3\}_2]}$$

A well known organocalcium compound is (Cp)calcium(I). Bis(allyl)calcium was described in 2009. It forms in a metathesis reaction of allylpotassium and calcium iodide as a stable non-pyrophoric off-white powder:

$$\ce{\overset{allylpotassium}{2KC3H5} + \overset{calcium\ iodide}{CaI2} ->[\ce{THF}][25^\circ \ce C] {(C3H5)2Ca} + 2KI}$$

The bonding mode is η^{3}. This compound is also reported to give access to an η^{1} polymeric (CaCH_{2}CHCH_{2})_{n} compound.

The compound [(thf)_{3}Ca{μ-C_{6}H_{3}-1,3,5-Ph_{3}}Ca(thf)_{3}] also described in 2009 is an inverse sandwich compound with two calcium atoms at either side of an arene.

Olefins tethered to cyclopentadienyl ligands have been shown to coordinate to calcium(II), strontium(II), and barium(II):

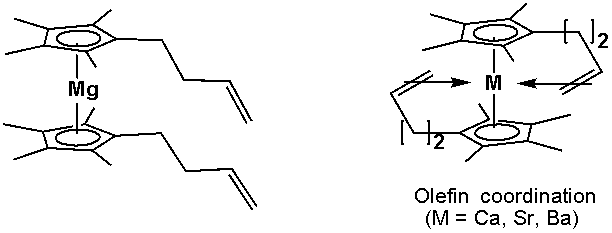

Organocalcium compounds have been investigated as catalysts.

=== Organostrontium ===
Organostrontium compounds have been reported as intermediates in Barbier-type reactions.

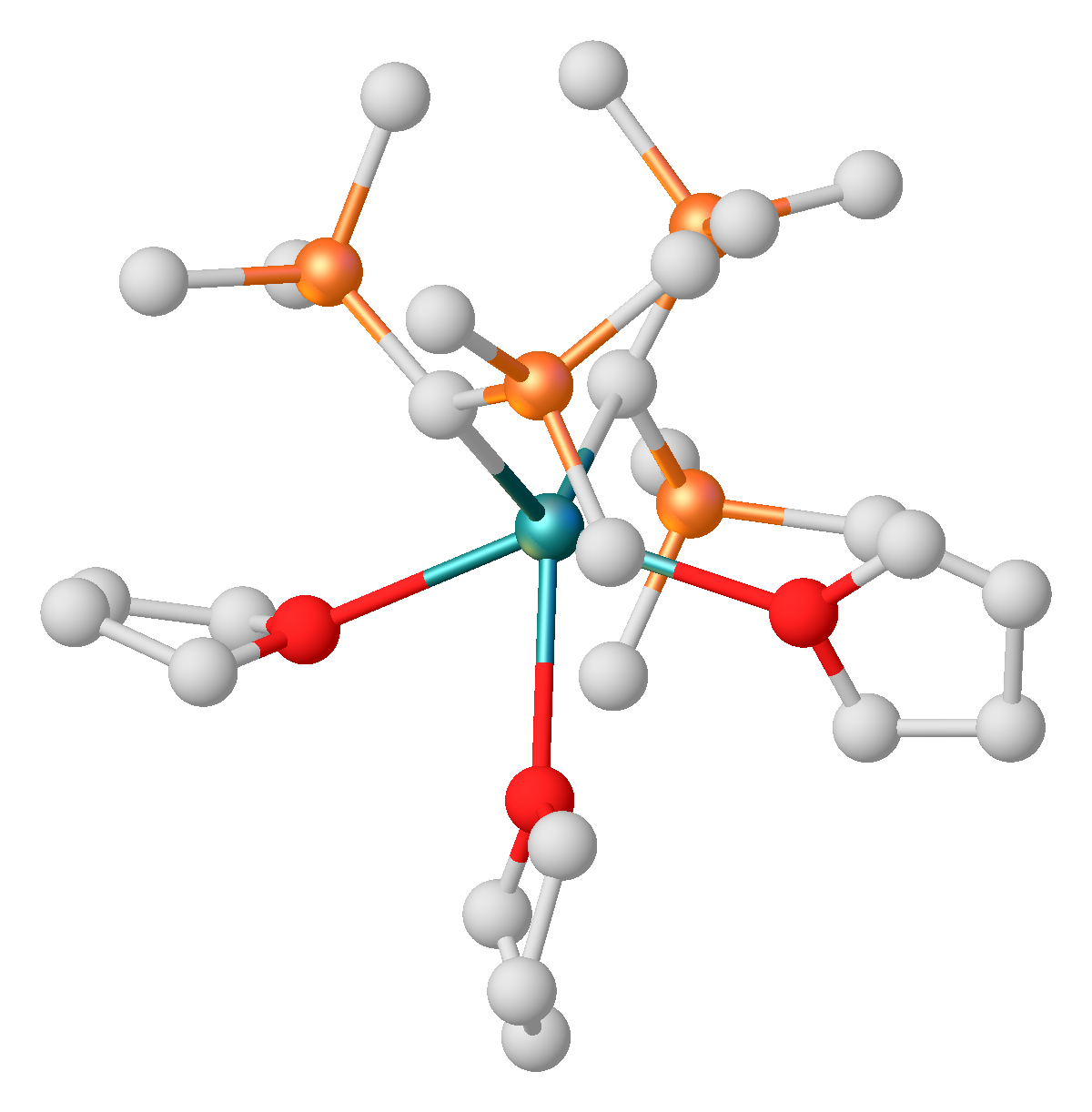
Structure of Ba(CH(tms)_{2})_{2}(thf)_{3} (tms = Si(CH_{3})_{3}), with H atoms omitted. Even with bulky alkyl substituents, Ba coordinates to three THF ligands.

=== Organobarium ===
Organobarium compounds of the type (allyl)BaCl can be prepared by reaction of activated barium (Rieke method reduction of barium iodide with lithium biphenylide) with allyl halides. These allylbarium compounds are useful precursors to carboxylic acids. Such reagents are more alpha-selective and more stereoselective than the related Grignards or organocalcium compounds. The metallocene (Cp*)_{2}Ba has also been reported.

=== Organoradium ===
The only known organoradium compound is the gas-phase acetylide.

== See also ==
- Organometallic chemistry
