= Organomagnesium chemistry =

Study of magnesium compounds in chemistry

Organomagnesium chemistry, a subfield of organometallic compounds, refers to the study of magnesium compounds that contains Mg-C bonds. Magnesium is the second element in group 2 (alkaline earth metals), and the ionic radius of Mg^{2+} is 86 pm, which is larger than Be^{2+} (59 pm) and smaller than the heavier alkaline earth metal dications (Ca^{2+} 114 pm, Sr^{2+} 132 pm, Ba^{2+} 149 pm), in accordance with periodic trends. Magnesium is less covalent compared to beryllium, and the radius is not large enough for accommodating large number of ligands compared to calcium, strontium and barium. Thus, organomagnesium compounds exhibit unique structure and reactivity in group 2.

From the perspective of applications, the Grignard reagents are the most important type of organomagnesium compound. They are widely used in synthetic chemistry, especially in organic synthesis, as a robust source of carbanion. Most other directions in organomagnesium chemistry are mainly of academic interest. Organomagnesium compounds are usually colorless. They are highly reactive toward air: water resulting on protonolysis, O_{2} giving peroxides and alkoxides, and CO_{2} giving carboxylates.

== Carbon as anionic σ-ligand ==
=== Grignard reagents ===
Discovered by Victor Grignard at the university of Lyon in 1900, compounds with empirical formula RMgX (R = carbanion, X = Cl, Br, I) are known as Grignard reagents. They are widely used in organic synthesis. Grignard reagents are a common source of carbanion equivalents, which can be used to perform nucleophilic addition, substitution, transmetalation, and metal-halogen exchange reactions. The first crystal structure of Grignard reagents was reported by Guggenberger and Rundle in 1964, from a crystalline EtMgBr(THF)_{2} (Et = ethyl, THF = tetrahydrofuran). The Mg-C bond length was found to be 2.15(2) Å, which is about the sum of covalent radii of magnesium (141(7) pm) and carbon (76(1) pm at sp^{3} hybridization).

Grignard reagents are dynamic in solution. The R and X groups are exchanged between magnesium centers. Via the Schlenk equilibrium, RMgX, MgR_{2}, and MgX_{2} equilibrate as well. These equilibria are relevant to the reactivity of Grignard reagents.

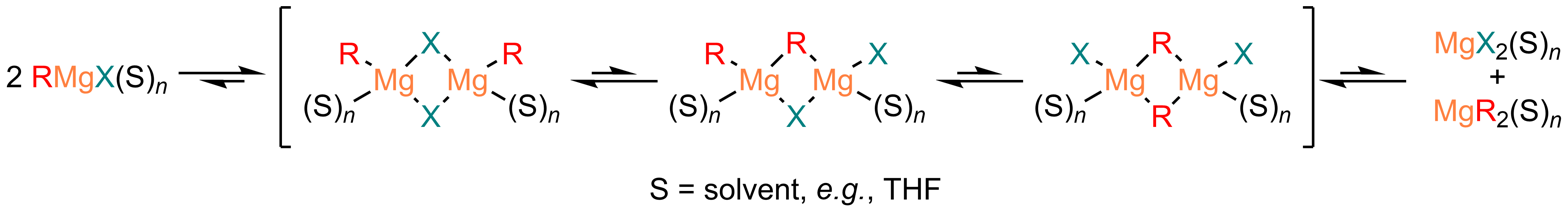
General scheme of dimerization of Grignard reagents and Schlenk equilibrium

=== Magnesium alkyls, alkynyls, and aryls ===
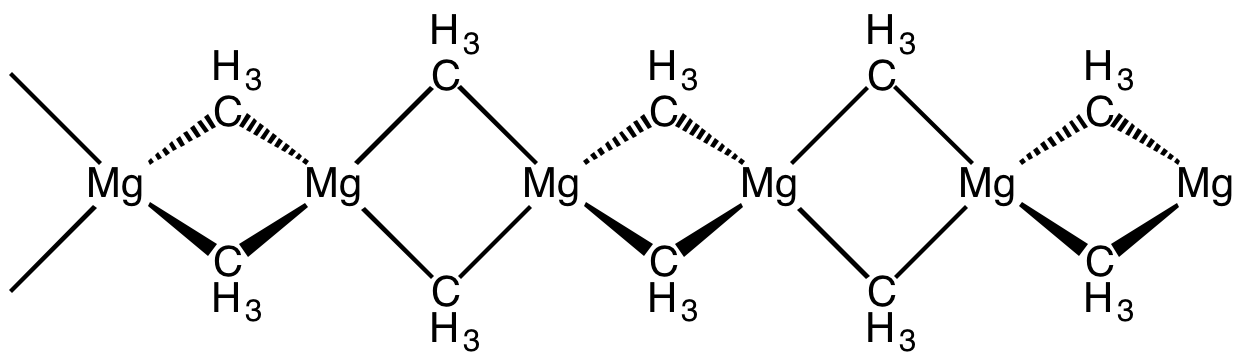
Structure of dimethylmagnesium.

Dialkylmagnesium is a fundamental type of organomagnesium compound. Such compounds can be prepared from Grignard reagents, via precipitation of magnesium halide. Solid state dialkylmagnesium forms one-dimensional chains via Mg-C-Mg 3c-2e bonds, and the Mg-C bond length is 2.24(3) Å in dimethylmagnesium (Me_{2}Mg)_{n}, which is about 10 pm longer than the terminal alkyl-Mg bonds (e.g. 2.15(2) Å in EtMgBr(THF)2). Dialkylmagnesium compounds can prepared by treating magnesium hydride with alkenes:

2 RCH=CH_{2} + MgH_{2} → Mg(C_{2}H_{4}R)_{2}

Many simple homoleptic organomagnesium species are known. Examples include [Mg_{2}(CH_{3})_{6}]^{2−}, [Mg(C_{6}H_{5})_{4}]^{2−}, and [Mg_{2}(C_{6}H_{5})_{6}]^{2−}. Illustrating the use of salt metathesis reaction as a synthesis route, the phenylene complex [C_{6}H_{4}Mg(thf)]_{4} was prepared from C_{6}H_{4}Li_{2} and magnesium bromide:

4 C_{6}H_{4}Li_{2} + 4 MgBr_{2} + 4 thf → [Mg(C_{6}H_{4})thf]_{4} + 8 LiBr

Illustrative of an alkynyl ("acetylide") complex is [Mg(C≡CC_{6}H_{5})_{4}]^{2−}. Such species are relatively easily generated reflecting the diminished basicity of the "acetylide anion" relative to the alkyl carbanions.

Carbomagnesiation is the addition of C-Mg bonds across C≡C bonds. The process typically employs a catalyst and proceeds via the intermediacy of vinyl-Mg species:

2 RC≡CR + RMgX → R_{2}C=CR−C(R)=CR(MgBr

=== Mixed metal derivatives ===
Structure of MgAl_{2}(CH_{3})_{8}

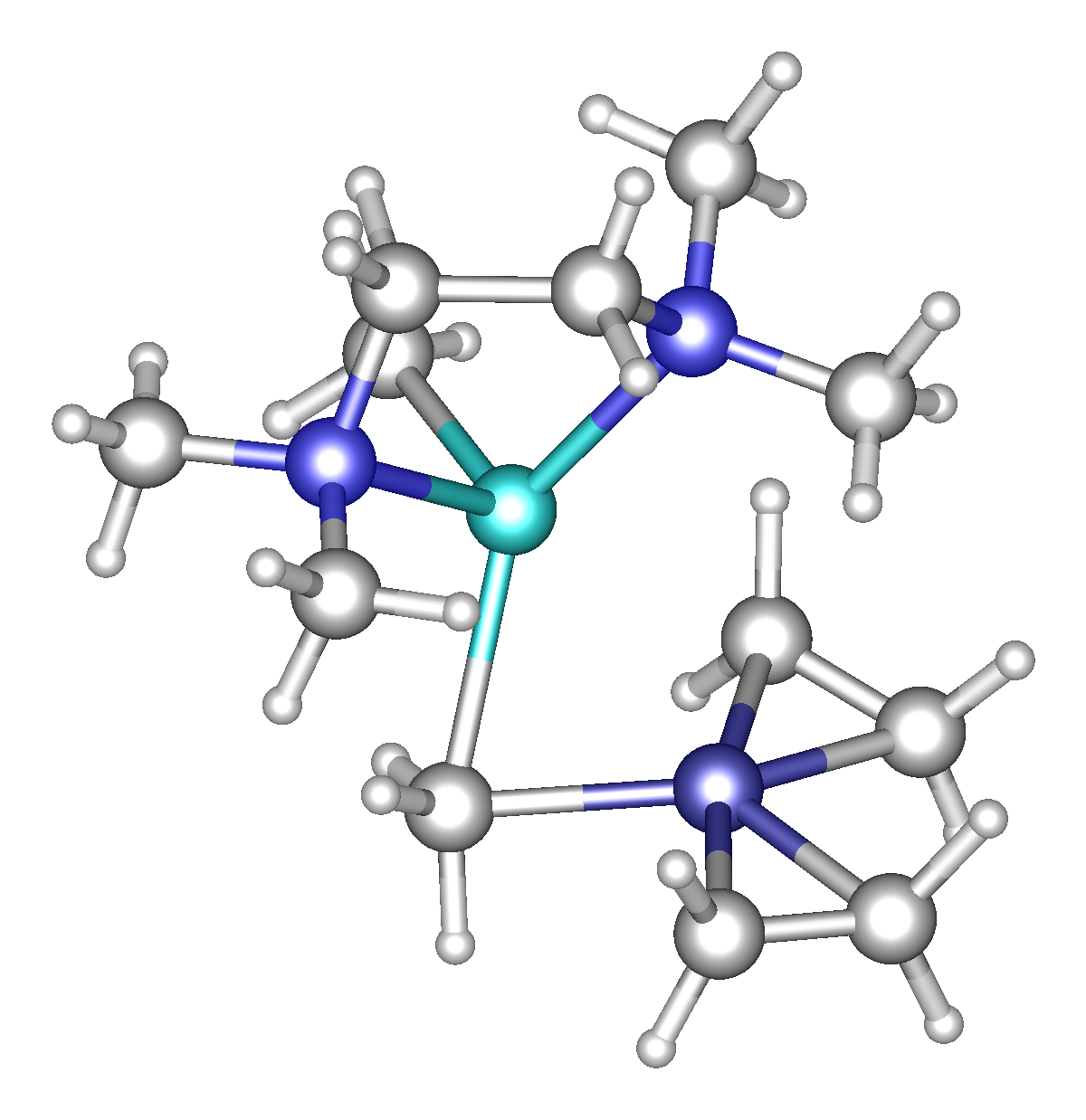
Ni(C_{2}H_{4})_{2}Mg(CH_{3})_{2}(tmeda). Color code: purple = N, Ni; turquoise = Mg; gray = C.

Being electron-rich, diorganomagnesium compounds function as ligands. With alkaline metals, they forms a variety of "ate complexes". In this way very simple compounds can be prepared such as Mg(CH_{2}C_{6}H_{5})_{4}Li(tmeda)]^{−}, featuring tetrabenzylmagnesium bound via two bridging methyl ligands to a Li(tmeda)^{+} center. This style of work often utilizes tetramethylethylenediamine (tmeda), an aprotic bidentate ligand that has a high affinity for alkali and alkaline earth metals.

Treating dimethylmagnesium with trimethylaluminium gives the neutral Al_{2}Mg(CH_{3})_{8}. Similarly, treating dimethylmagnesium-tmeda with the nickel(0) ethylene complex Ni(C_{2}H_{4})_{3} gives the neutral (C_{2}H_{4})_{2}Ni(μ−CH_{3})Mg(CH_{3})(tmeda), with displacement of one ethylene ligand.

=== Magnesium anthracene ===
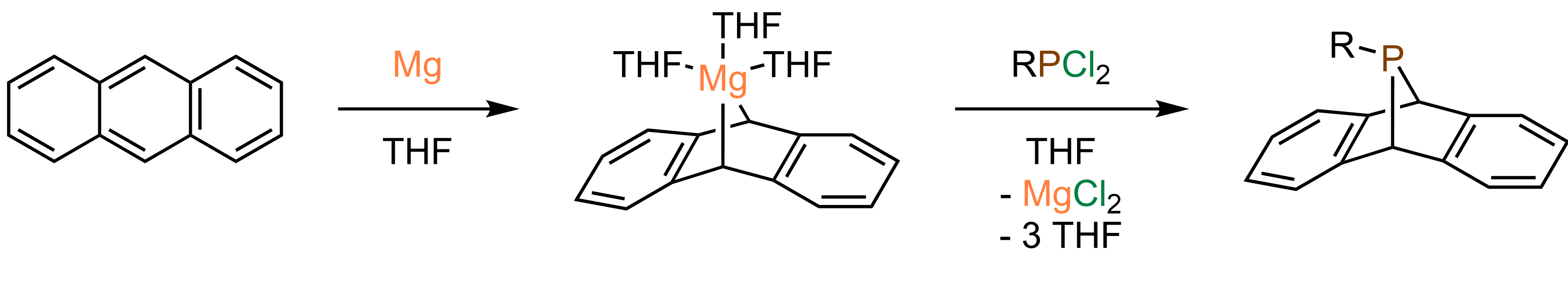
Synthesis of magnesium anthracene.

Magnesium anthracene was first prepared by Ramsden in 1965 using a THF suspension of magnesium and anthracene. Subsequent work led to the isolation of the soluble derivative [(C_{14}H_{10})Mg(THF)_{3}]. According to X-ray crystallography, the Mg-C9 and Mg-C10 distances are 2.225(1) Å]. The structural results show that magnesium anthracene can be treated as an magnesium alkyl. It is a particularly versatile reagent.

Derivatives of magnesium anthracene have been described.

In terms of its reactivity, [(C_{14}H_{10})Mg(THF)_{3}] behaves as the equivalent of [C_{14}H_{10}]^{2-} . The two negative charges localized on C9 and C10. It thus act as nucleophile to give functionalized anthracene or 9,10-dihydroanthracene derivatives. Magnesium anthracene reacts with arylphosphinous chlorides to give dibenzo-7λ^{3}-phosphanorbornadiene (RPC_{14}H_{10}), which can be used as phosphinidene transfer reagent.

== N-heterocyclic carbene complexes ==
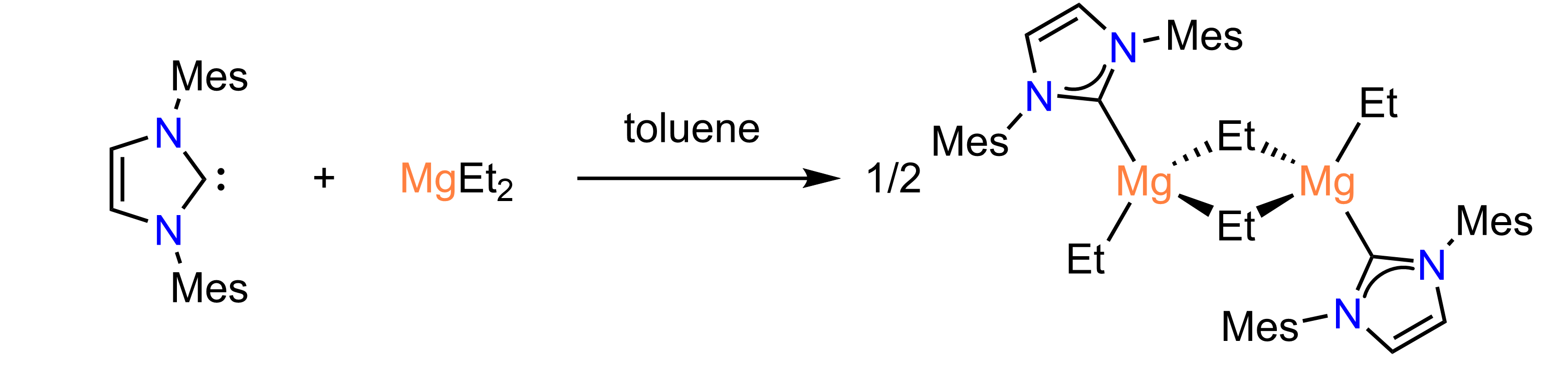
Early example of neutral magnesium-NHC complex

The first characterized N-heterocyclic carbene (NHC) complex of magnesium, [(IMes)MgEt_{2}]_{2} are synthesized by simply mixing the stable carbene with diethylmagnesium. In [(IMes)MgEt_{2}]_{2} the Mg-C(IMes) bond length was found to be 2.279(3) Å, which is significantly longer than the terminal Mg-C(Et) bond of 2.133(4) Å.

The NHC adduct of MgCp*_{2} (Cp* = pentamethylcyclopentadienyl) features one η^{5}- and one η^{3}-Cp* ligands. NHCs with side arms were also explored. Related examples are known. and the magnesium complex using NHC with phenol arms were synthesized and characterized.

NHC's stabilize cationic alkyl magnesium complexes [LMgMe(THF)_{2}]^{+} BPh_{4}^{−} (L = IMes, IPr). The synthesis proceeds through an dimeric intermediate with two μ^{2}-Me bridges. In [(IPr)MgMe(THF)_{2}]^{+}, the Mg-C(IPr) distance was found to be 2.2224(13) Å, which is slightly shorter than the distance in neutral NHC complexes. L_{2}MgMeBr and [L_{3}MgMe]^{+}Br^{−} (L = 1,3,4,5-tetramethylimidazol-2-ylidene) exist in equilibrium in d^{5}-bromobenzene solution, showing the substitution is facile despite its being endothermic.

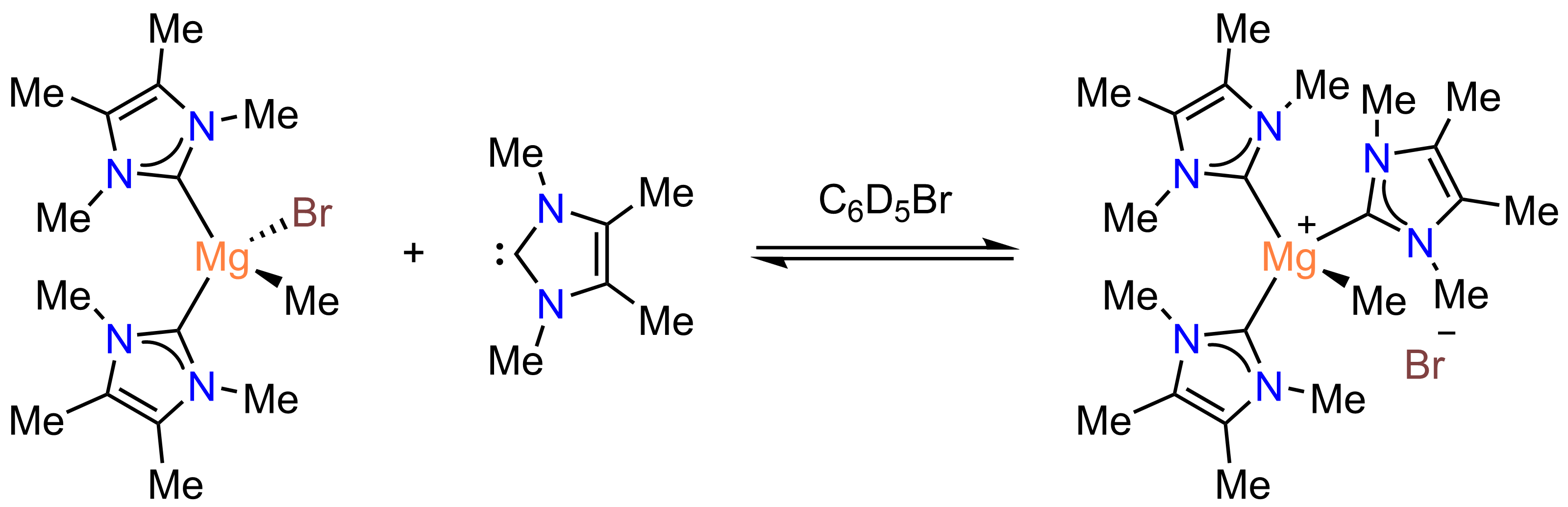
Equilibrium between neutral and cationic magnesium-NHC complexes.

== Carbon as π-ligand ==
=== Cylopentadienyl complexes ===
Dicyclopentadienyl (Cp) magnesium or magnesocene (Cp_{2}Mg) was first characterized in 1954 by Wilkinson and Cotton, and later crystal structure analysis shows that it features a 5-fold symmetry with two η^{5}-cyclopentadienyl ligands. MgCp_{2} has an average Mg-C distance of 2.304(8) Å an average C-C distance of 1.39(2) Å, which is in agreement with a later gas-phase diffraction study. For comparison, in ferrocene the Fe-C distance is 2.04(1) Å and the C-C distance is 1.40(2) Å. Magnesocene derivatives generally adopt the ideal structures with staggered parallel Cp rings, though introducing large steric hindrance may distort the geometry, such as [{1,2,4-(Me_{3}Si)_{3}C_{5}H_{2}}_{2}Mg] which has slightly bent sandwich structure.

^{25}Mg-NMR spectroscopy suggested the Mg-Cp interaction has significant covalent character. However, because of lacking (n-1)d orbitals and back bonding, the Mg-Cp interaction is weak, enabling cyclopentadienyl magnesium complexes to serve as Cp^{−} precursor. For example, in the following reaction Cp_{2}Mg transfers two Cp^{−} ligands to synthesize the [MnCp_{3}]^{−} anion:

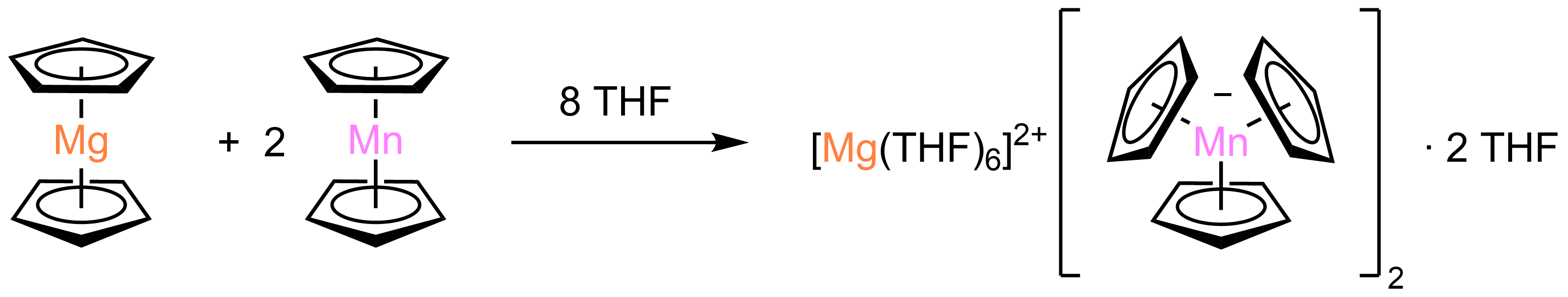
Synthesizing the [MnCp_{3}]^{−} anion from Cp_{2}Mg and Cp_{2}Mn

Adding ligands to magnesocene derivatives gives bent Cp_{2}MgL species, and the bonding modes of the cyclopentadiene are sensitive to the changes in the coordination environment. In [(C_{5}Me_{4}H)_{2}MgL] (L = 1,3-di-iso-propyl-4,5-dimethylimidazol-2-ylidene), one of the C_{5}Me_{4}H ligand is slipped by 0.807 Å from the center, which makes difference of 0.69 Å between the shortest and the longest Mg-C distance on the ligand. Thus the complex can be described as [(η^{5}-C_{5}Me_{4}H)(η^{3}-C_{5}Me_{4}H)MgL].

=== Magnesium complexes with neutral π ligands ===
Magnesium binds alkenes, alkynes, and arenes relucantly. The low affinity for main group elements for such ligands is well established. The trend is illustrated by structural studies on Mg-allyl species, which fail to reveal interactions between Mg and the pi-system.

Mg does bind to alkynes and arenes in [(Dipp-NacNac)Mg(EtC≡CEt)][B(C_{6}F_{5})_{4}] and [(Dipp-NacNac)Mg(η^{3}-C_{6}H_{6})][B(C_{6}F_{5})_{4}] (Dipp-Nacnac = [HC{C(Me)NDipp}_{2}]^{−}). In the alkyne complex the two Mg-C distances are 2.480(2) and 2.399(2) Å, and in the arene complex the shortest Mg-C bond length is 2.520(2) Å. The first intramolecular Mg-alkene complex is [(Dipp-NacNac)Mg(H_{2}C=CEt_{2})][B(C_{6}F_{5})_{4}], Mg is closer to the terminal methylene with Mg-C distance of 2.338(2) Å, and the longer Mg-C distance is 2.944(5) Å. The Mg-alkene interactions, which are long, are described as ion-induced dipole interactions, and the large asymmetry in the 2-ethylbutene complex should be attributed to charge distribution on the two sp^{2} carbon atoms.

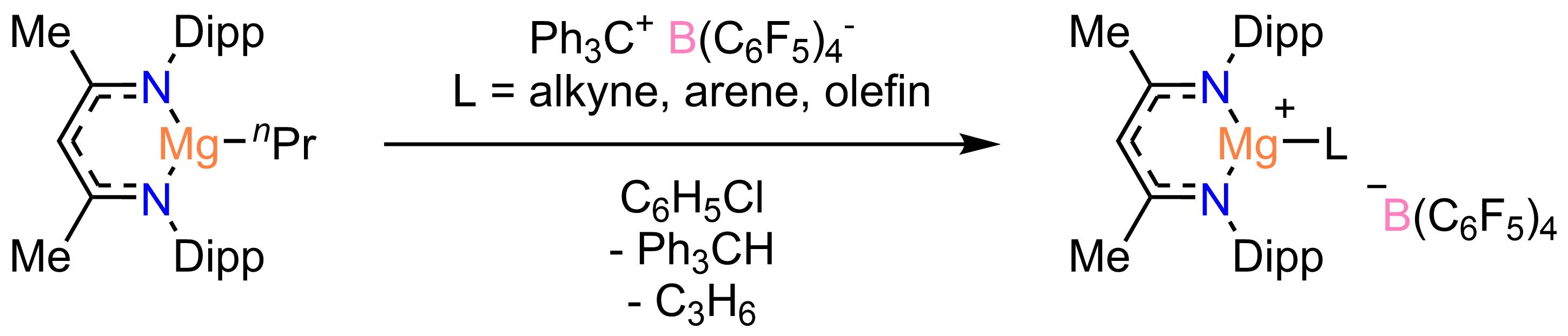
Synthesis of cationic magnesium-π complexes using Dipp-NacNac scaffold

== Further examples ==
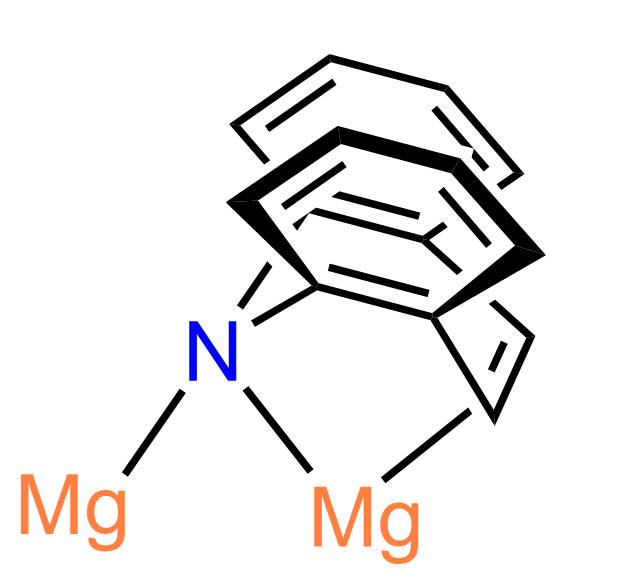

Mg--dibenzo[b,f]azepinate) fragment

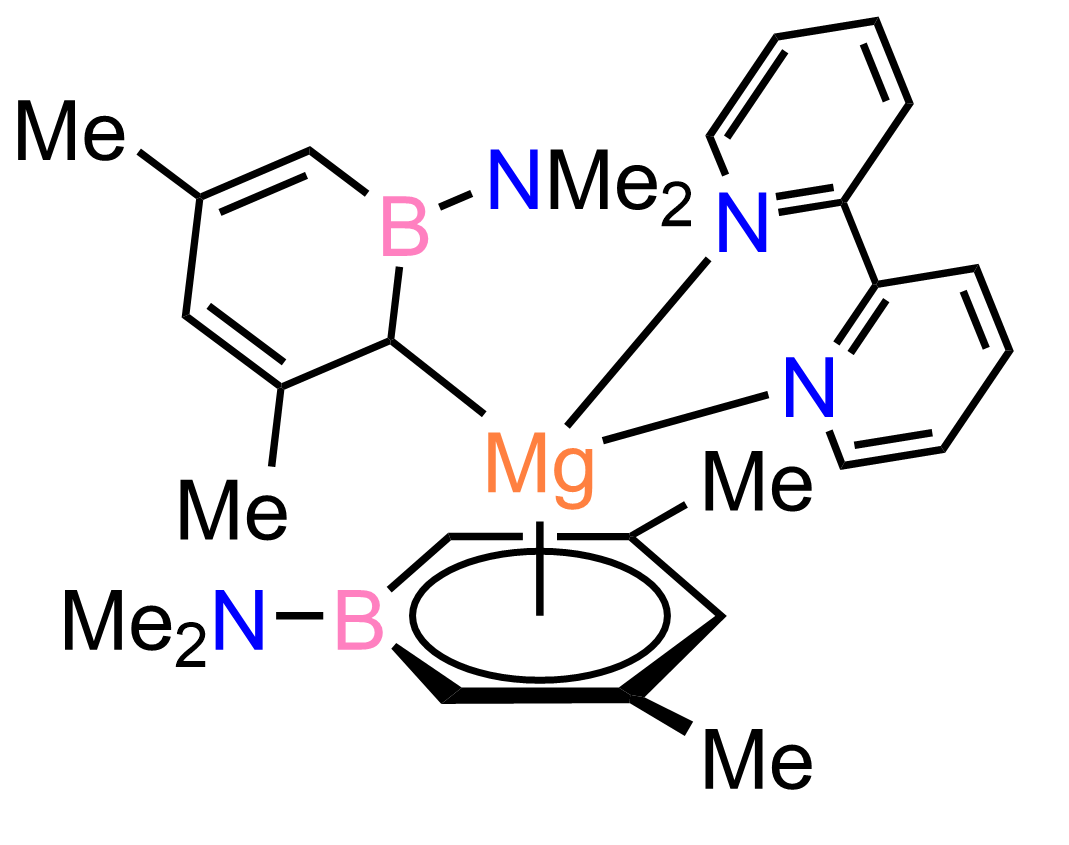

Boratabenzene-Mg complex

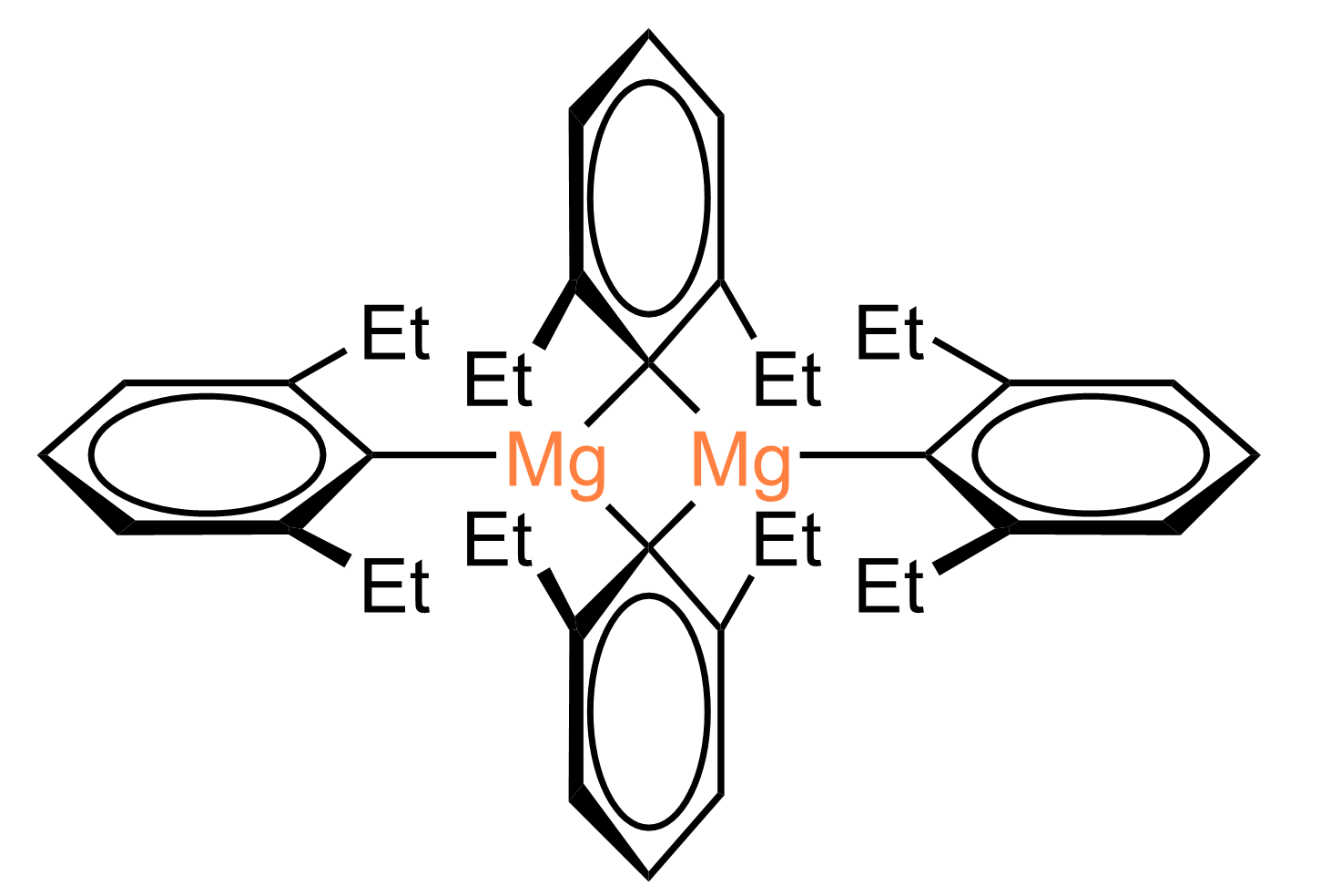

[(2,6-Et_{2}C_{6}H_{3})_{2}Mg]_{2}

== See also ==
- Magnesium compounds
- Main group organometallic chemistry
- Group 2 organometallic chemistry
- Organoberyllium chemistry
- Organocalcium chemistry
- Alkaline earth octacarbonyl complex
- Organozinc chemistry
