= Magnesium compounds =

Magnesium oxide, a compound of magnesium

Magnesium compounds production

Magnesium compounds are compounds formed by the element magnesium (Mg). These compounds are important to industry and biology, including magnesium carbonate, magnesium chloride, magnesium citrate, magnesium hydroxide (milk of magnesia), magnesium oxide, magnesium sulfate, and magnesium sulfate heptahydrate (Epsom salts).

== Inorganic compounds ==
=== Hydrides, halides and oxo-halides ===
Magnesium hydride was first prepared in 1951 by the reaction between hydrogen and magnesium under high temperature, pressure and magnesium iodide as a catalyst. It reacts with water to release hydrogen gas; it decomposes at 287 °C, 1 bar:

MgH_{2} → Mg + H_{2}

Magnesium can form compounds with the chemical formula MgX_{2} (X=F, Cl, Br, I) with halogens. Except for magnesium fluoride, the halides are easily soluble in water, but the solubility of magnesium fluoride is higher than that of other alkaline earth metal fluorides. High-purity magnesium fluoride is produced industrially by the reaction of magnesium sulfate and sodium fluoride, which sublimates at 1320 °C. Magnesium chloride is generally obtained by chlorination of magnesium oxide, or by reacting magnesium chloride hexahydrate with ammonium chloride under dry hydrogen chloride, and then thermally decomposing the resulting magnesium ammonium double salt. Its hydrate will be hydrolyzed, making the solution acidic; direct heating of the hydrate will give the hydrolyzed product:

[Mg(H_{2}O)_{6}]^{2+} → [Mg(H_{2}O)_{5}(OH)]^{+} + H_{3}O^{+} (decomposes in water)
MgCl_{2}·nH_{2}O → Mg(OH)Cl + HCl + (n-1)H_{2}O (decomposes when heated)

Magnesium chloride is an ionic compound, which can be electrolysed in a molten state to form magnesium and chlorine gas. The properties of magnesium bromide and magnesium iodide are similar. HMgX (X=Cl,Br,I) can be obtained by reacting the corresponding magnesium halide with magnesium hydride.

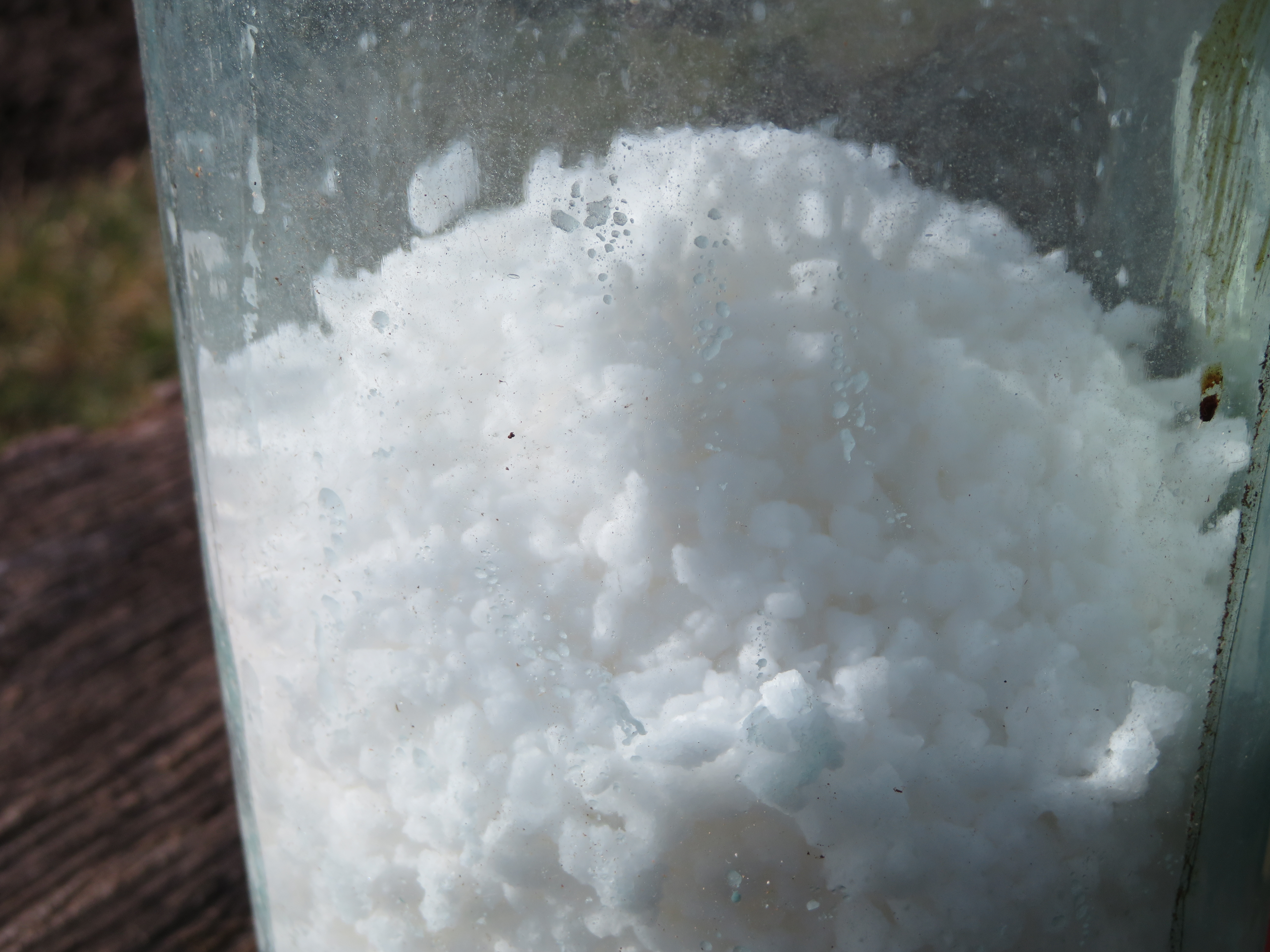
Magnesium perchlorate is a white solid commonly used as a desiccant.

Magnesium hypochlorite and magnesium chlorite are unstable compounds, they are easy to hydrolyze, the former generates basic salt Mg(OCl)_{2}·2Mg(OH)_{2} and the latter generates hydroxide Mg(OH)_{2}; magnesium chlorate can be obtained by reacting magnesium carbonate with chloric acid and crystallizing hexahydrate from solution, which can also be obtained by reacting magnesium hydroxide with chlorine gas and extracted with acetone:

6 Mg(OH)_{2} + 6 Cl_{2} → 5 MgCl_{2} + Mg(ClO_{3})_{2} + 6 H_{2}O

Magnesium perchlorate is a white powder that is easily soluble in water, which can be obtained by the reaction of magnesium oxide and perchloric acid. The hexahydrate crystallizes from the solution, and then it is dried with phosphorus pentoxide in a vacuum at 200~250 °C to obtain the anhydrous form. It is a commonly used desiccant and can also be used as a Lewis acid or electrophile activator. Magnesium perbromate can also crystallize out of the solution to form the hexahydrate, which can be heated to obtain anhydrous, and the anhydrous is further heated, and it decomposes into magnesium oxide, bromine and oxygen.

=== Oxides and chalcogenides ===
Magnesium oxide is the end product of the thermal decomposition of some magnesium compounds and is usually prepared by igniting carbonates or hydroxides. Magnesium hydroxide is a strong electrolyte, which can be obtained by the reaction of a soluble magnesium salt and sodium hydroxide. Like magnesium oxide, it will generate a basic carbonate when placed in the air. Magnesium sulfide can be produced by the reaction of magnesium and hydrogen sulfide, or by the reaction of magnesium sulfate and carbon disulfide at high temperature:

Mg + H_{2}S → MgS + H_{2}
3 MgSO_{4} + 4 CS_{2} → 3 MgS + 4 COS + 4 SO_{2}

It can be hydrolyzed to Mg(HS)_{2}, and further hydrolyzed to Mg(OH)_{2} at higher temperatures. A solution of magnesium hydrosulfide can also be prepared by reacting hydrogen sulfide with magnesium oxide in suspension. Magnesium polysulfides have been studied in magnesium-sulfur batteries. Magnesium selenide is more reactive than zinc selenide and decomposes in humid air; the properties of magnesium telluride and magnesium selenide are similar.

== Organic compounds ==
=== Grignard reagent ===
The name of the Grignard reagent comes from the French chemist Victor Grignard who discovered it. This type of organomagnesium compound has the general formula R–Mg–X, where R is a hydrocarbon group and X is a halogen. They are usually coordinated with solvent molecules. bit. Grignard reagents can be obtained by reacting magnesium with halogenated hydrocarbons in a solvent. Since there is an oxide film on the surface of magnesium, iodine is generally added to accelerate the reaction. Grignard reagents are commonly used in organic synthesis to extend carbon chains:

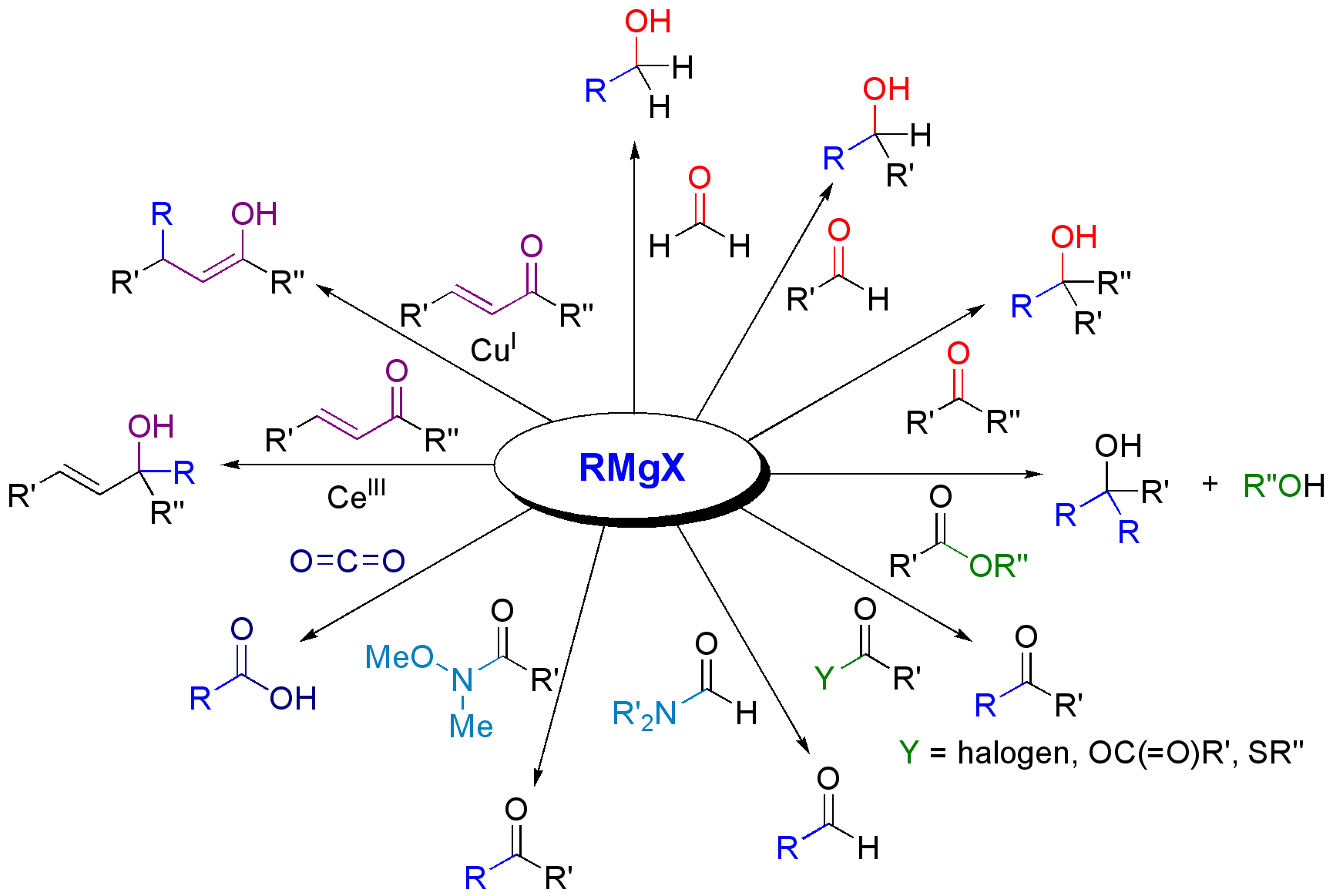

=== Dihydrocarbylmagnesium ===
Dihydrocarbylmagnesium is an organic compound with R–Mg–R’, which can be prepared by the reaction of dihydrocarbylmercury and magnesium. Their reactivity is similar to that of Grignard reagents, and they can react with oxygen, water, and ammonia.

Magnesium anthracene is the product obtained from the reaction of magnesium and anthracene in tetrahydrofuran, which can be used to provide C_{14}H_{10}^{2−} carbanions, which react with electrophiles to obtain di-derivatives of hydrogen anthracene.

== Applications ==
Magnesium compounds, primarily magnesium oxide (MgO), are used as a refractory material in furnace linings for producing iron, steel, nonferrous metals, glass, and cement. Magnesium oxide and other magnesium compounds are also used in the agricultural, chemical, and construction industries. Magnesium oxide from calcination is used as an electrical insulator in fire-resistant cables. Other applications include:

- Magnesium hydride is under investigation as a way to store hydrogen.
- Magnesium reacted with an alkyl halide gives a Grignard reagent, which is a very useful tool for preparing alcohols.
- Magnesium salts are included in various foods, fertilizers (magnesium is a component of chlorophyll), and microbe culture media.
- Magnesium sulfite is used in the manufacture of paper (sulfite process).
- Magnesium phosphate is used to fireproof wood used in construction.
- Magnesium hexafluorosilicate is used for moth-proofing textiles.

== See also ==
- Sodium compounds
- Aluminium compounds
- Calcium compounds

== External reading ==
- "Magnesium Compounds Statistics and Information". USGS. Archived from the original on 2021-12-06.
