= Beryllocene =

Identifiers
CAS Number	37048-03-6 η^{1}, η^{5}; 12083-43-1 η^{5}, η^{5}
3D model (JSmol)	Interactive image
ChemSpider	10157199
PubChem CID	11984699
CompTox Dashboard (EPA)	DTXSID80958217
- InChI: InChI=1S/2C5H5.Be/c2*1-2-4-5-3-1;/h2*1-5H;/q2*-1;+2 Key: MXNRFULXBRJVRO-UHFFFAOYSA-N
- SMILES: c1ccc[cH-]1.[Be+2].c2ccc[cH-]2

Properties
Chemical formula	C_{10}H_{10}Be
Molar mass	139.202 g·mol^{−1}
Appearance	colorless crystals
Melting point	59 °C (138 °F; 332 K)
Boiling point	233 °C (451 °F; 506 K)
- Except where otherwise noted, data are given for materials in their standard state (at 25 °C [77 °F], 100 kPa). Infobox references

Beryllocene is an organoberyllium compound with the chemical formula Be(C_{5}H_{5})_{2}, first prepared in 1959. The colorless substance can be crystallized from petroleum ether in the form of white needles at −60 °C and decomposes quickly upon contact with atmospheric oxygen and water.

== Preparation ==
Beryllocene can be prepared by reacting beryllium chloride and sodium cyclopentadienide in benzene or diethyl ether:

$$\mathrm{BeCl_2 +\ 2\ Na(C_5H_5)\ \xrightarrow[]{Et_2O} Be(C_5H_5)_2 + 2\ NaCl }$$

== Properties ==
=== Physical ===
In contrast to the uncharged metallocenes of the transition metals V, Cr, Fe, Co, Ni, Ru and Os, which have a strictly symmetrical and therefore dipoleless structure, beryllocene has an electric dipole moment of 2.46 Debye (in benzene), or 2.24 Debye (in cyclohexane), indicating asymmetry of the molecule. In the IR spectrum there are signals at 1524, 1610, 1669, 1715 and 1733 cm^{−1}, which also indicate that the structure does correspond to that of ferrocene. In contrast, the nuclear magnetic resonance spectrum shows only one signal down to −135 °C, indicating either a symmetrical structure or a rapid fluctuation of the rings.

=== Structure ===
Beryllocene shows different molecular geometries depending on the physical state. The low-temperature X-ray structure analysis shows a slipped sandwich structure, i.e. the rings are offset from each other - one ring is η^{5} coordinated with a Be-Cp distance of 152 pm, the second only η^{1} coordinated (Be-Cp distance: 181 pm). The reason for the η^{5}, η^{1} structure is that the orbitals of beryllocene can only be occupied with a maximum of 8 valence electrons. In the gas phase both rings η^{5} appear to be coordinated. In fact, one ring is significantly further from the central atom than the other (190 and 147 pm) and the apparent η^{5} coordination is due to a rapid fluctuation of the bond. Based on gas-phase electron diffraction studies at 120 °C, Arne Haaland concluded in 1979 that the two rings are only about 80 pm shifted from each other and are not coordinated η^{5},η^{1}, but rather η^{5},η^{3}.

Like beryllocene, the octamethyl derivative Be(C_{5}Me_{4}H)_{2} has a slipped sandwich structure with η^{5},η^{1} coordination. In contrast Be(C_{5}Me_{5})_{2} shows the classic η^{5},η^{5} coordination. In the crystal, however, the Be-C distances vary between 196.9(1) and 211.4(1) pm.

=== Chemical ===
Beryllocene decomposes relatively quickly in tetrahydrofuran, forming a yellowish gel. It reacts violently in water to produce beryllium hydroxide and cyclopentadiene:

Be(C_{5}H_{5})_{2} + 2 H_{2}O → Be(OH)_{2} + 2 C_{5}H_{6}

Like magnesocene, beryllocene also forms ferrocene with iron(II) chloride. The driving force is the formation of the very stable ferrocene molecule.

Be(C_{5}H_{5})_{2} + FeCl_{2} → BeCl_{2} + Fe(C_{5}H_{5})_{2}

It is predicted to react with beryllium to generate C_{5}H_{5}BeBeC_{5}H_{5}.

== Safety ==
Beryllocene is toxic and carcinogenic.
