= Sodium compounds =

Chemical elements containing sodium

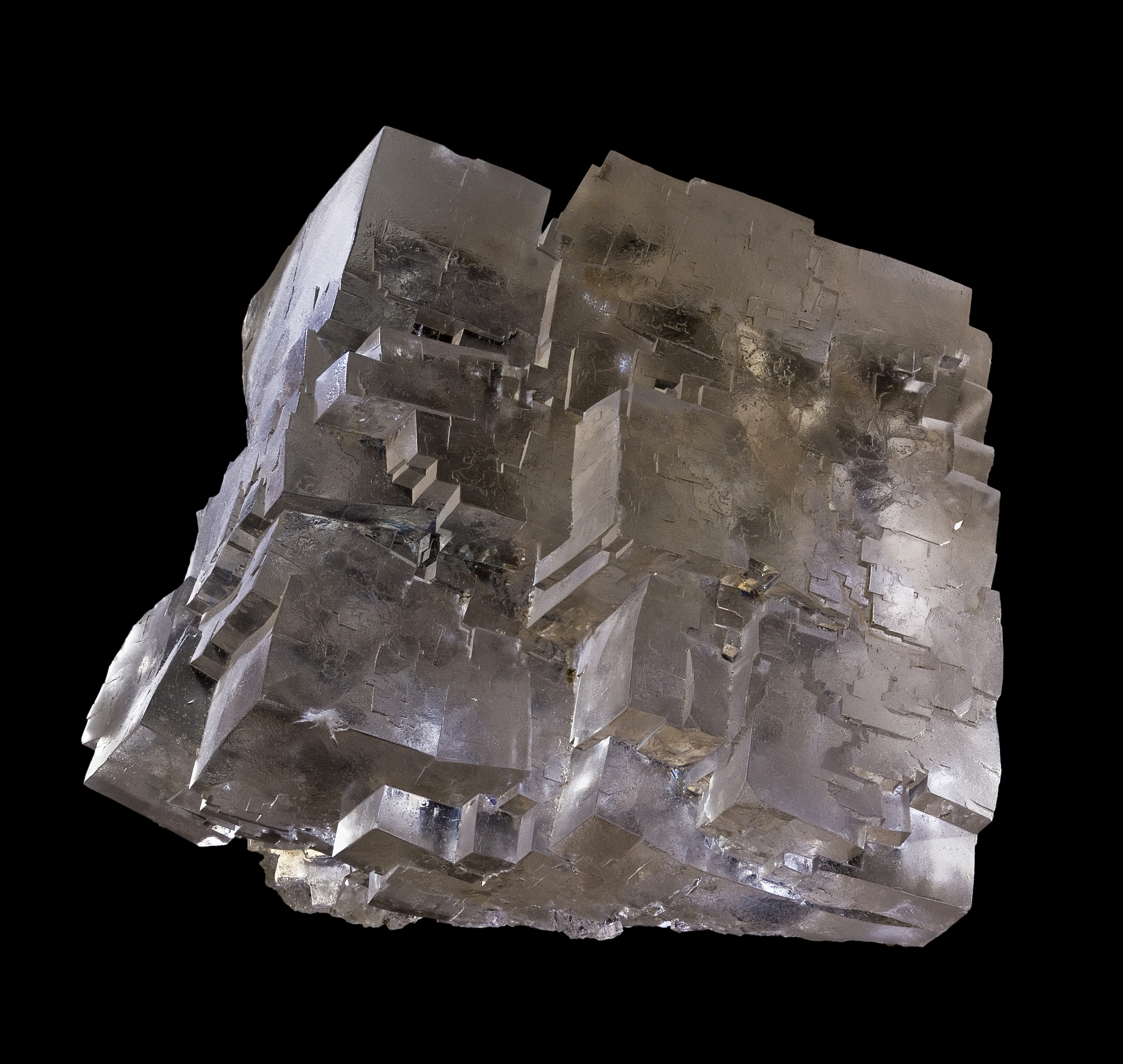
Sodium chloride crystal, also known as salt, a compound of sodium

Sodium atoms have 11 electrons, one more than the stable configuration of the noble gas neon. As a result, sodium usually forms ionic compounds involving the Na^{+} cation. Sodium is a reactive alkali metal and is much more stable in ionic compounds. It can also form intermetallic compounds and organosodium compounds. Sodium compounds are often soluble in water.

== Metallic sodium ==
Metallic sodium is generally less reactive than potassium and more reactive than lithium. Sodium metal is highly reducing, with the standard reduction potential for the Na^{+}/Na couple being −2.71 volts, though potassium and lithium have even more negative potentials, making it the least reducing alkali metal. The thermal, fluidic, chemical, and nuclear properties of molten sodium metal have caused it to be one of the main coolants of choice for the fast breeder reactor. Such nuclear reactors are seen as a crucial step for the production of clean energy.

== Salts and oxides ==
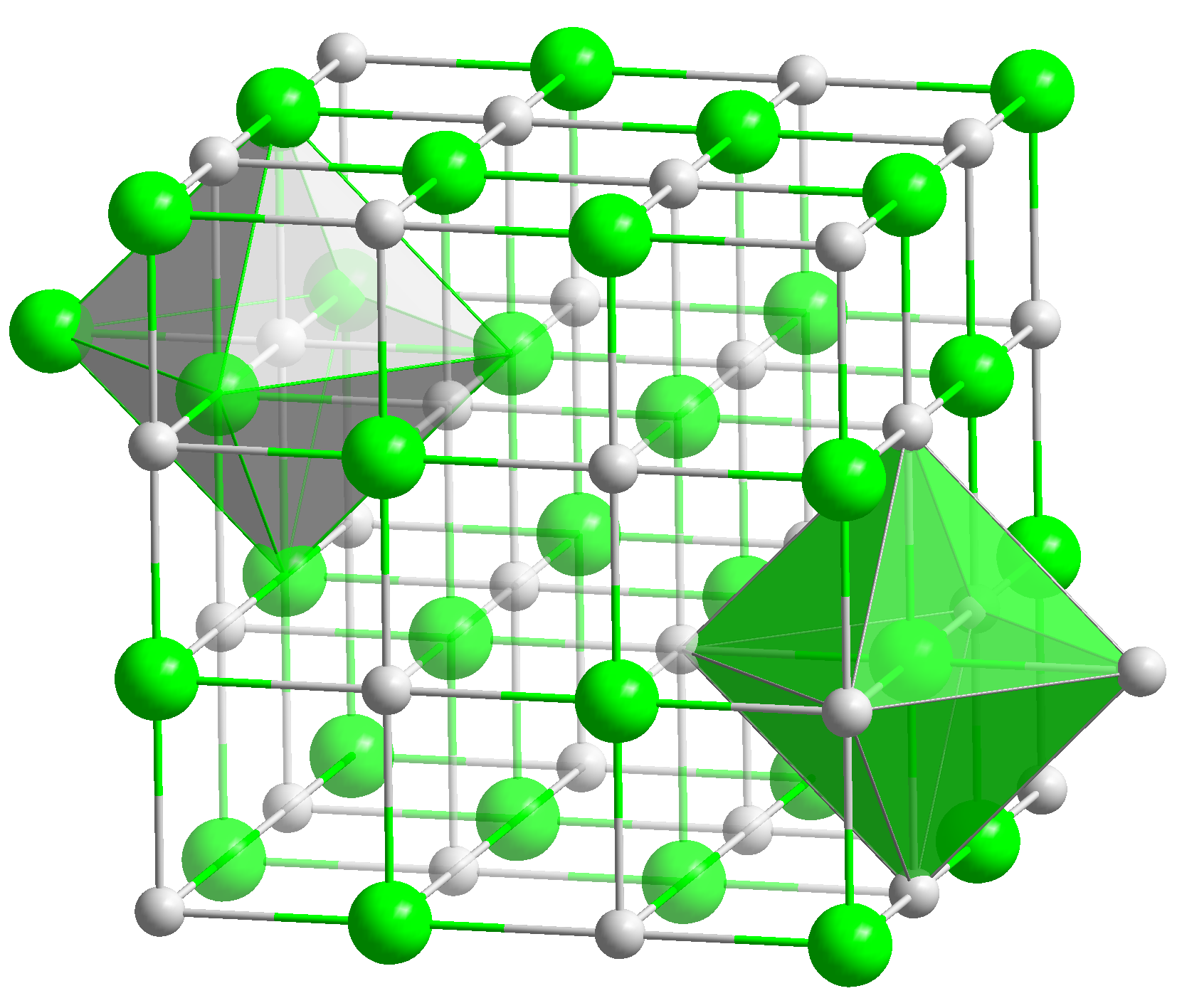
The structure of sodium chloride, showing octahedral coordination around Na^{+} and Cl^{−} centres. This framework disintegrates when dissolved in water and reassembles when the water evaporates.

Sodium compounds are of immense commercial importance, being particularly central to industries producing glass, paper, soap, and textiles. The most important sodium compounds are table salt (NaCl), soda ash (Na_{2}CO_{3}), baking soda (NaHCO_{3}), caustic soda (NaOH), sodium nitrate (NaNO_{3}), di- and tri-sodium phosphates, sodium thiosulfate (Na_{2}S_{2}O_{3}·5H_{2}O), and borax (Na_{2}B_{4}O_{7}·10H_{2}O). In compounds, sodium is usually ionically bonded to water and anions and is viewed as a hard Lewis acid.

Two equivalent images of the chemical structure of sodium stearate, a typical soap.

Most soaps are sodium salts of fatty acids. Sodium soaps have a higher melting temperature (and seem "harder") than potassium soaps. Sodium containing mixed oxides are promising catalysts and photocatalysts. Photochemically intercalated sodium ion enhances the photoelectrocatalytic activity of WO_{3}.

Like all the alkali metals, sodium reacts exothermically with water. The reaction produces caustic soda (sodium hydroxide) and flammable hydrogen gas. When burned in air, it forms primarily sodium peroxide with some sodium oxide.

== Aqueous solutions ==
Sodium tends to form water-soluble compounds, such as halides, sulfates, nitrates, carboxylates and carbonates. The main aqueous species are the aquo complexes [Na(H_{2}O)_{n}]^{+}, where n = 4–8; with n = 6 indicated from X-ray diffraction data and computer simulations.

Direct precipitation of sodium salts from aqueous solutions is rare because sodium salts typically have a high affinity for water. An exception is sodium bismuthate (NaBiO_{3}). Because of the high solubility of its compounds, sodium salts are usually isolated as solids by evaporation or by precipitation with an organic antisolvent, such as ethanol; for example, only 0.35 g/L of sodium chloride will dissolve in ethanol. Crown ethers, like 15-crown-5, may be used as a phase-transfer catalyst.

Sodium content of samples is determined by atomic absorption spectrophotometry or by potentiometry using ion-selective electrodes.

== Electrides and sodides ==
Like the other alkali metals, sodium dissolves in ammonia and some amines to give deeply colored solutions; evaporation of these solutions leaves a shiny film of metallic sodium. The solutions contain the coordination complex (Na(NH_{3})_{6})^{+}, with the positive charge counterbalanced by electrons as anions; cryptands permit the isolation of these complexes as crystalline solids. Sodium forms complexes with crown ethers, cryptands and other ligands.

For example, 15-crown-5 has a high affinity for sodium because the cavity size of 15-crown-5 is 1.7–2.2 Å, which is enough to fit the sodium ion (1.9 Å). Cryptands, like crown ethers and other ionophores, also have a high affinity for the sodium ion; derivatives of the alkalide Na^{−} are obtainable by the addition of cryptands to solutions of sodium in ammonia via disproportionation.

== Organosodium compounds ==
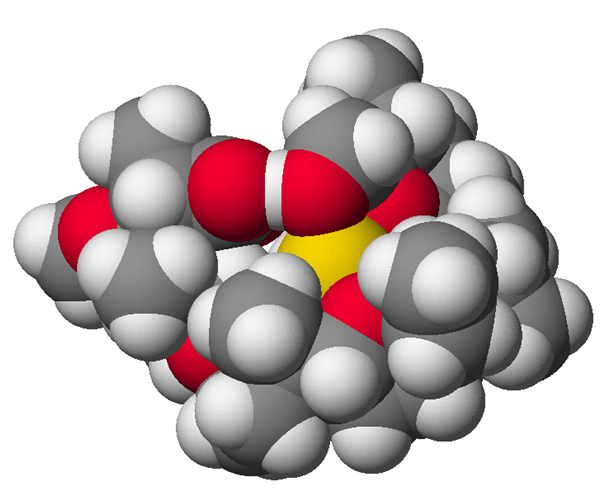
The structure of the complex of sodium (Na^{+}, shown in yellow) and the antibiotic monensin-A.

Many organosodium compounds have been prepared. Because of the high polarity of the C-Na bonds, they behave like sources of carbanions (salts with organic anions). Some well-known derivatives include sodium cyclopentadienide (NaC_{5}H_{5}) and trityl sodium ((C_{6}H_{5})_{3}CNa). Sodium naphthalene, Na^{+}[C_{10}H_{8}•]^{−}, a strong reducing agent, forms upon mixing Na and naphthalene in ethereal solutions.

== Intermetallic compounds ==
Sodium forms alloys with many metals, such as potassium, calcium, lead, and the group 11 and 12 elements. Sodium and potassium form KNa_{2} and NaK. NaK is 40–90% potassium and it is liquid at ambient temperature. It is an excellent thermal and electrical conductor. Sodium-calcium alloys are by-products of the electrolytic production of sodium from a binary salt mixture of NaCl-CaCl_{2} and ternary mixture NaCl-CaCl_{2}-BaCl_{2}. Calcium is only partially miscible with sodium, and the 1-2% of it dissolved in the sodium obtained from said mixtures can be precipitated by cooling to 120 °C and filtering.

Sodium forms various intermetallic compounds with lead, and mixtures are fully miscible above 403 °C. NaPb, Na_{9}Pb_{4}, Na_{5}Pb_{2}, and Na_{15}Pb_{4} are some of the known stoichiometric sodium-lead alloys. There are several methods to make sodium-lead alloys. One is to melt them together and another is to deposit sodium electrolytically on molten lead cathodes. Sodium and mercury can form various useful alloys known as sodium amalgams, with compositions such as NaHg, NaHg_{4}, NaHg_{2}, Na_{3}Hg_{2}, and Na_{3}Hg. Sodium also forms alloys with gold (NaAu_{2}) and silver (NaAg_{2}). Group 12 metals (zinc, cadmium and mercury) are known to make alloys with sodium. NaZn_{13} and NaCd_{2} are alloys of zinc and cadmium.

== See also ==
- Lithium compounds
- Magnesium compounds
