= Allylpotassium =

Names
- IUPAC name Potassium prop-2-en-1-ide
- Other names: Potassium prop-1-ene; Potassium 2-Propenyl; Allylpotassium; Potassium allyl

Identifiers
CAS Number	7329-38-6
3D model (JSmol)	Interactive image
ChemSpider	35786254
PubChem CID	12859842
CompTox Dashboard (EPA)	DTXSID50511691
- InChI: InChI=1S/C3H5.K/c1-3-2;/h3H,1-2H2;/q-1;+1 Key: ZPQJASJRBFXYKB-UHFFFAOYSA-N
- SMILES: [K+].[CH2-]C=C

Properties
Chemical formula	C_{3}H_{5}K
Molar mass	80.171 g·mol^{−1}
Appearance	colorless solid
- Except where otherwise noted, data are given for materials in their standard state (at 25 °C [77 °F], 100 kPa). Infobox references

Allylpotassium is an organopotassium compound with the molecular formula CH_{2}=CHCH_{2}K. It is a colorless, extremely air-sensitive compound that is usually generated and handled in solution. It is synthesized by metalation of propylene with Schlosser's base, a mixture of potassium tert-butoxide and butyl lithium:

CH_{2}=CHCH_{3} + LiC_{4}H_{9} + KOC(CH_{3})_{3} → KCH_{2}CHCH_{2} + C_{4}H_{10} + LiOC(CH_{3})_{3}

Consistent with its extreme air-sensitivity, allylpotassium is highly nucleophilic. For example, it adds to pyridine, allowing the synthesis of 4-allyl-1,4-dihydropyridines. Trimethylsilyl-substituted allylpotassium have been characterized by X-ray crystallography
