= Organoberyllium chemistry =

Organoberyllium Complex in Main Group Chemistry

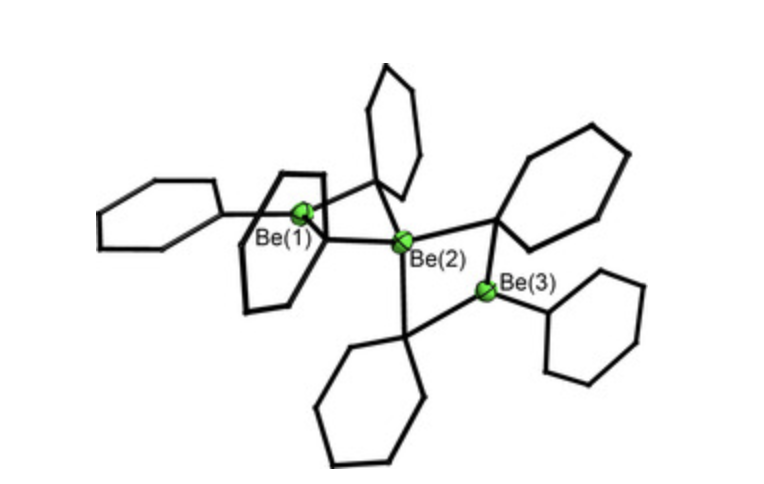
Structure of diphenylberyllium, which has the formula Be_{3}(C_{6}H_{5})_{6}.

Organoberyllium chemistry involves the synthesis and properties of organometallic compounds featuring the group 2 alkaline earth metal beryllium (Be). The area remains less developed relative to the chemistry of other main-group elements, because Be compounds are toxic and few applications have been found.

== Structure ==
=== Homoleptic compounds ===
The structure of dimethylberyllium.

The coordination number of Be in organoberyllium compounds ranges from two to four.

Dimethylberyllium and dimethylmagnesium adopt the same structure. Diethylberyllium, however, does not structurally resemble diethylmagnesium (which has the same structure as dimethylmagnesium). This contrast is attributed to the small size of Be relative to its heavier congener Mg: Be is one of the smallest atoms on the periodic table. Dineopentylberyllium and many other dialkyl derivatives has been reported.

The phenyl derivative is represented by trimeric Be_{3}Ph_{6}. A terphenyl derivative is known. With bulky aryl ligands three-coordination is observed, see Be(mesityl)_{2}O(C_{2}H_{5})_{2}.

Organoberyllium compounds are typically prepared by transmetallation or alkylation of beryllium chloride.

=== Beryllocene ===
This structure of Be(C_{5}H_{5})_{2}

Beryllocene features both pi- and sigma-bonded cyclopentadienyl ligands. It is prepared from BeCl_{2} and potassium cyclopentadienide:

2 K[Cp] + BeCl_{2} → [Cp]_{2}Be + 2 KCl

=== Mixed ligand compounds ===
Many mixed ligand complexes are simply formed by addition of Lewis bases to diaryl and dialkylberyllium compounds. Many derivatives are known of the type BeR_{2}L_{2} and BAr_{2}L_{2} are known where L = thioether, pyridine, NHC, and 1,4-Diazabutadienes. Beryllium forms a variety of complexes with N-hetereocyclic carbenes (NHCs).

== Low oxidation beryllium chemistry ==
While the +2-oxidation state is by far the most common for Be, compounds containing Be(I) and Be(0) have been described. A number of beryllium complexes with cyclic alkyl amino carbene (CAAC) ligands have been proposed to feature low-oxidation state beryllium centres. However, these low-oxidation state formulations have been contested due to the redox non-innocence of CAAC ligands. Unambiguous low-oxidation state organo-beryllium complexes with Be–Be bonds have been synthesized by the group of Simon Aldridge.

== History ==
Dimethylberyllium was reported in 1876. A. Atterberg produced this first organoberyllium compound by treatment of dimethylmercury with elemental beryllium. The alkylation of beryllium halides was studied by H. Gilman. Early systematic work was conducted by G. E. Coates.

== See also ==
- Group 2 organometallic chemistry
- Beryllium
