= Magnesium anthracene =

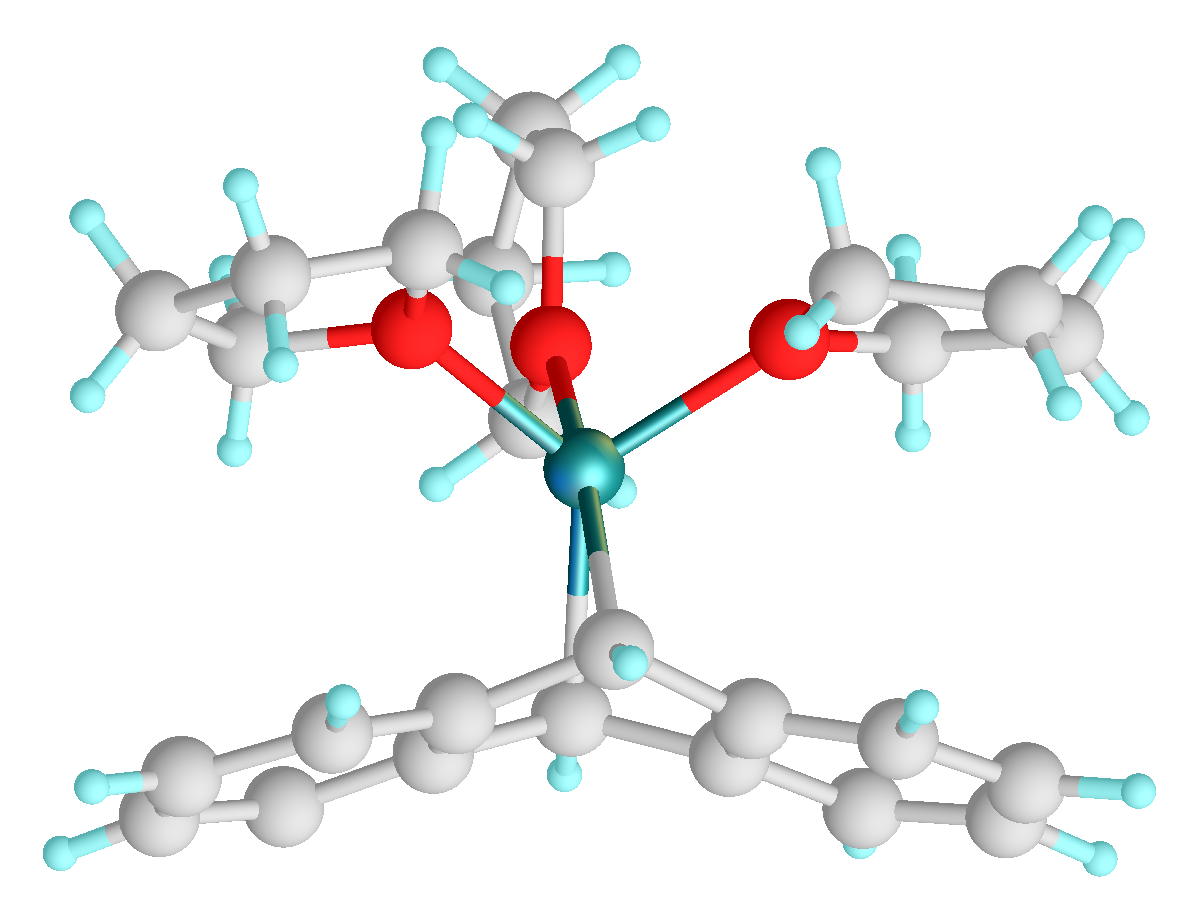

Identifiers
CAS Number	86901-19-1
3D model (JSmol)	Interactive image; 3 thf: Interactive image
ChemSpider	3 thf: 9038788
ECHA InfoCard	100.210.465
PubChem CID	21928237 with charge error; 3 thf: 10863500
- InChI: InChI=1S/C14H10.Mg/c1-2-6-12-10-14-8-4-3-7-13(14)9-11(12)5-1;/h1-10H;/q;+2 Key: UUHXXHJSGPKOGI-UHFFFAOYSA-N; 3 thf: InChI=1S/C14H10.3C5H10O.Mg/c1-2-6-12-10-14-8-4-3-7-13(14)9-11(12)5-1;3*1-2-4-6-5-3-1;/h1-10H;3*1-5H2; Key: RWNAQYFPPNXQES-UHFFFAOYSA-N
- SMILES: C1=CC=C2C=C3C=CC=CC3=CC2=C1.[Mg]; 3 thf: C1CCOCC1.C1CCOCC1.C1CCOCC1.C1=CC=C2C=C3C=CC=CC3=CC2=C1.[Mg]

Properties
Chemical formula	C_{26}H_{34}MgO_{3}
Molar mass	418.860 g·mol^{−1}
Appearance	orange solid
Density	1.184 g/cm^{3}
- Except where otherwise noted, data are given for materials in their standard state (at 25 °C [77 °F], 100 kPa). Infobox references

Magnesium anthracene is an organomagnesium compound that is almost invariably isolated as its adduct with three tetrahydrofuran (thf) ligands. With the formula Mg(C_{14}H_{10})(thf)_{3}, this air- and water-sensitive orange solid is obtained by heating a suspension of magnesium in a thf solution of anthracene.

== Structure and reactivity ==
According to X-ray crystallography, the Mg center is 5-coordinate, occupying a C_{2}O_{3} ligand sphere. The fold angle between the two benzo groups is 72.6°.

The compound behaves as a source of the carbanion [C_{14}H_{10}]^{2-} as well as a source of highly reactive Mg. With electrophiles, the compound reacts to give dihydroanthracene derivatives C_{14}H_{10}E_{2}. Electrophiles include ketones, CO_{2}, organotin chlorides, and organoaluminium chlorides. Ethylene inserts into one Mg-C bond. Hydrogen induces release of anthracene, yielding magnesium hydride (MgH_{2}).
