= Glaser coupling =

Chemical reaction in organic chemistry

Named after	Carl Andreas Glaser
Reaction type	Coupling reaction

Identifiers
Organic Chemistry Portal	glaser-coupling
RSC ontology ID	RXNO:0000098

The Glaser coupling is a type of coupling reaction. It is by far one of the oldest coupling reactions and is based on copper compounds like copper(I) chloride or copper(I) bromide and an additional oxidant like air. The base used in the original research paper is ammonia and the solvent is water or an alcohol. The reaction was first reported by Carl Andreas Glaser in 1869. He suggested the following process on his way to diphenylbutadiyne:

CuCl + PhC_{2}H + NH_{3} → PhC_{2}Cu + NH_{4}Cl
4 PhC_{2}Cu + O_{2} → 2PhC_{2}C_{2}Ph + 2Cu_{2}O

== Modifications ==
=== Eglinton reaction ===
Eglinton reaction
Named after	Geoffrey Eglinton
Reaction type	Coupling reaction

Identifiers
Organic Chemistry Portal	eglinton-reaction
RSC ontology ID	RXNO:0000099

In the related Eglinton reaction two terminal alkynes are coupled by a copper(II) salt such as cupric acetate.

$$\ce{2R-\!{\equiv}\!-H ->[\overset{}\ce{Cu(OAc)2}][\ce{pyridine}] R-\!{\equiv}\!-\!{\equiv}\!-R}$$

The oxidative coupling of alkynes has been used to synthesize a number of natural products. The stoichiometry is represented by this highly simplified scheme:

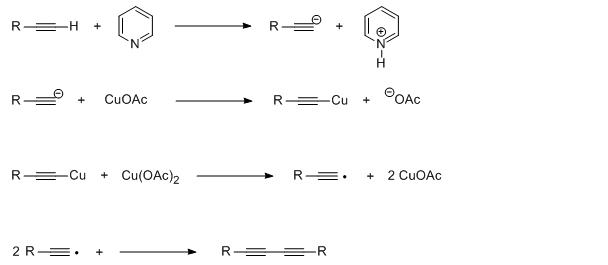

Such reactions proceed via copper(I)-alkyne complexes.

This methodology was used in the synthesis of cyclooctadecanonaene. Another example is the synthesis of diphenylbutadiyne from phenylacetylene.

=== Hay coupling ===
The Hay coupling is variant of the Glaser coupling. It relies on the TMEDA complex of copper(I) chloride to activate the terminal alkyne. Oxygen (air) is used in the Hay variant to oxidize catalytic amounts of Cu(I) to Cu(II) throughout the reaction, as opposed to a stoichiometric amount of Cu(II) used in the Eglington variant. The Hay coupling of trimethylsilylacetylene gives the butadiyne derivative.

== Scope ==
In 1882 Adolf von Baeyer used the method to prepare 1,4-bis(2-nitrophenyl)butadiyne, en route to indigo dye.

Shortly afterwards, Baeyer reported a different route to indigo, now known as the Baeyer–Drewsen indigo synthesis.

== See also ==
- Cadiot–Chodkiewicz coupling – another alkyne coupling reaction catalysed by copper(I)
- Sonogashira coupling – Pd/Cu catalysed coupling of an alkyne and an aryl or vinyl halide
- Castro–Stephens coupling – a cross-coupling reaction between a copper(I) acetylide and an aryl halide
- Fritsch–Buttenberg–Wiechell rearrangement – can also form diynes.
