= Organocopper chemistry =

Compound with carbon to copper bonds

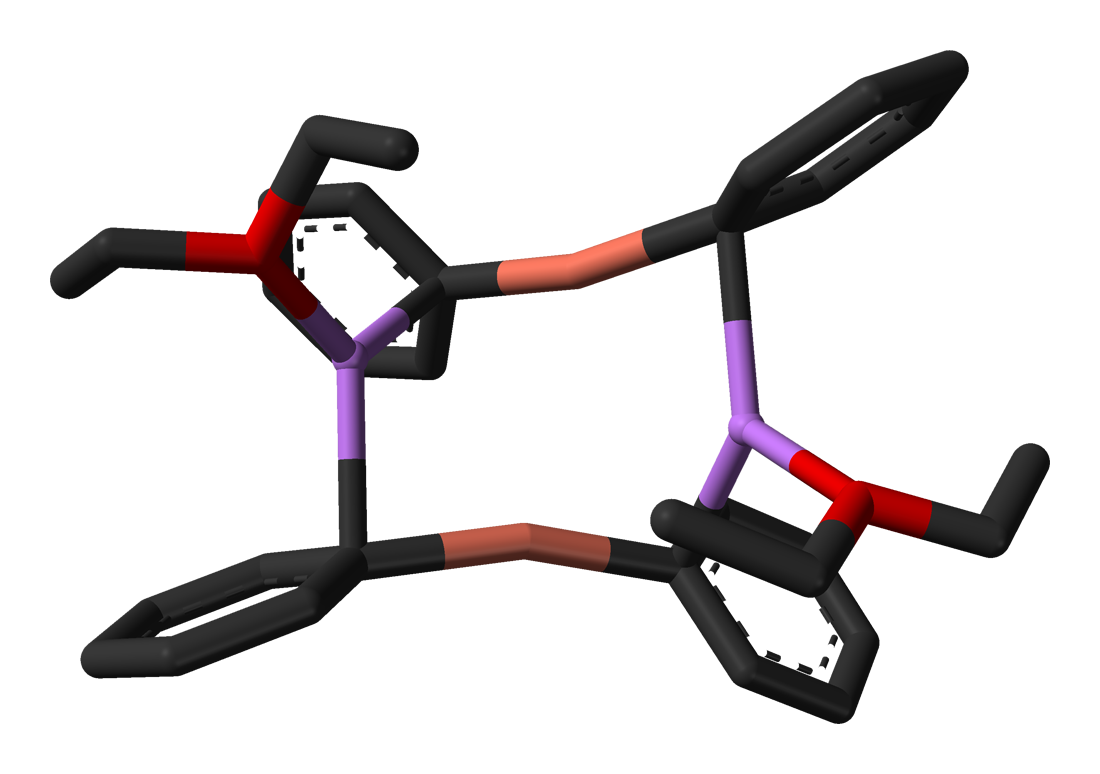
Lithium diphenylcuprate etherate dimer from crystal structure

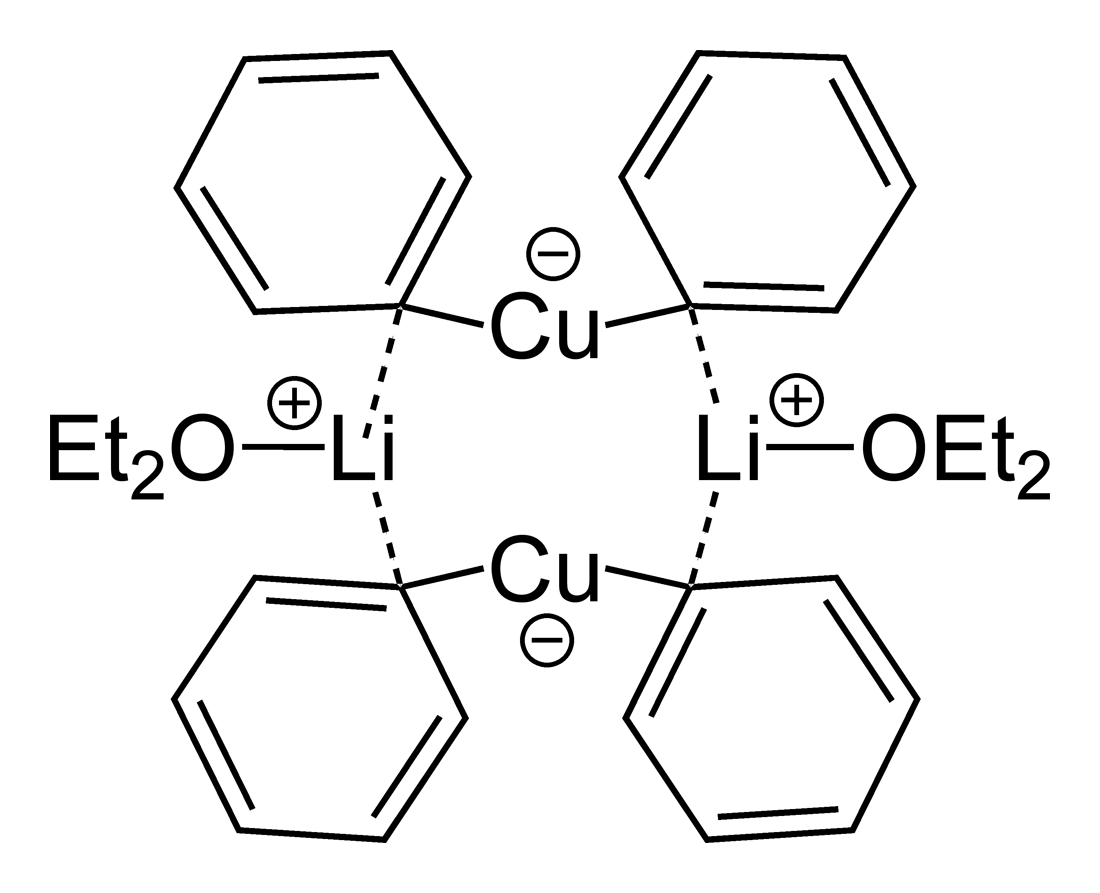
Skeletal formula of lithium diphenylcuprate etherate dimer

Organocopper chemistry is the study of the physical properties, reactions, and synthesis of organocopper compounds, which are organometallic compounds containing a carbon to copper chemical bond. They are reagents in organic chemistry.

The first organocopper compound, the explosive copper(I) acetylide Cu_{2}C_{2} (Cu^{+}[^{−}C≡C^{−}]Cu^{+}), was synthesized by Rudolf Christian Böttger in 1859 by passing acetylene gas through a solution of copper(I) chloride in ammonia:

C_{2}H_{2} + 2 [Cu(NH_{3})_{2}]Cl → Cu_{2}C_{2} + 2 NH_{4}Cl + 2 NH_{3}

== Structure and bonding ==
Organocopper compounds are diverse in structure and reactivity, but almost all are based on copper with an oxidation state of +1, sometimes denoted Cu(I) or Cu^{+}. With 10 electrons in its valence shell, the bonding behavior of Cu(I) is similar to Ni(0), but owing to its higher oxidation state, it engages in less pi-backbonding. Organic derivatives of copper's higher oxidation states of +2 and +3 are sometimes encountered as reaction intermediates, but rarely isolated or even observed.

Organocopper compounds form complexes with a variety of soft ligands such as alkylphosphines (R_{3}P), thioethers (R_{2}S), and cyanide (CN^{−}).

Due to the spherical electronic shell of Cu^{+}, copper(I) complexes have symmetrical structures - either linear, trigonal planar or tetrahedral, depending on the number of ligands.

== Simple complexes with CO, alkene, and Cp ligands ==
Copper(I) salts have long been known to bind CO, albeit weakly. A representative complex is the polymeric carbonylcopper(I) chloride CuCl(CO). Unlike classical metal carbonyls, these compounds exhibit little π backbonding.

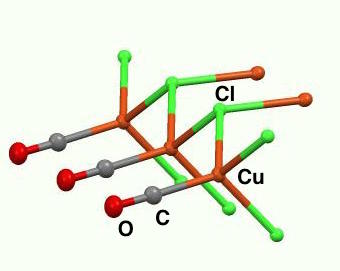
CuCl(CO) crystal structure excerpt. The Cu centers are tetrahedral, linked by triply bridging chloride ligands.

Alkenes bind to copper(I), although again generally weakly. Dewar-Chatt-Duncanson backbonding between Cu^{+} and alkenes is a consequence of electron correlation, and so invisible to Hartree-Fock simulation. The binding of ethylene to Cu in proteins has a broad significance in plant biology so much so that ethylene is classified as a plant hormone. Its presence, detected by the Cu-protein, affects fruit ripening and many other developments.

Copper forms no metallocene, and adds cyclopentadiene only in the presence of "soft" Lewis bases to give half-sandwich complexes. One such derivative is π-cyclopentadienyl(triethylphosphine)copper(I), [C_{5}H_{5}]^{−}[Cu(P(CH_{2}CH_{3})_{3})]^{+}.

== Alkyl- and arylcopper compounds ==
=== Copper(I) ===
Copper halides react with organolithium reagents to give organocopper compounds. The area was pioneered by Henry Gilman, who reported methylcopper in 1936. Thus, phenylcopper is prepared by reaction of phenyllithium with copper(I) bromide in diethyl ether. Grignard reagents can be used in place of organolithium compounds. Gilman also investigated the dialkylcuprates. These are obtained by combining two equivalent of RLi with Cu(I) salts. Alternatively, these cuprates are prepared from oligomeric neutral organocopper compounds by treatment with one equivalent of organolithium reagent.

Compounds of the type [CuR_{n}]^{(n−1)−} are reactive towards oxygen and water, forming copper(I) oxide. They also tend to be thermally unstable, which can be useful in certain coupling reactions. Despite or because of these difficulties, organocopper reagents are frequently generated and consumed in situ with no attempt to isolate them. They are used in organic synthesis as alkylating reagents because they exhibit greater functional group tolerance than corresponding Grignard and organolithium reagents. The electronegativity of copper is much higher than its next-door neighbor in the group 12 elements, zinc, suggesting diminished nucleophilicity for its carbon ligands.

Copper salts react with terminal alkynes to form the acetylides.

Alkyl halides react with organocopper compounds with inversion of configuration. On the other hand, reactions of organocopper compound with alkenyl halides proceed with retention of subtrate's configuration.

Organocopper compounds couple with aryl halides (see Ullmann condensation and Ullmann reaction):

ArX + (Ar')_{2}CuLi ⇌ ArAr'CuLi + Ar'X
2 ArAr'CuLi ⇌ (Ar)_{2}CuLi + (Ar')_{2}CuLi
ArAr'CuLi + O_{2} → Ar−Ar'

==== Aggregation ====
Alkyl and aryl copper complexes aggregate both in crystalline form and in solution. Aggregation is especially evident for charge-neutral organocopper compounds, i.e. species with the empirical formula (RCu), which adopt cyclic structures. Since each copper center requires at least two ligands, the organic group is a bridging ligand. This effect is illustrated by the structure of mesitylcopper, which is a pentamer. A cyclic structure is also seen for CuCH_{2}SiMe_{3}, where Me stands for methyl group CH_{3}, the first 1:1 organocopper compound to be analyzed by X-ray crystallography (1972 by Lappert). This compound is relatively stable because the bulky trimethylsilyl groups provide steric protection. It is a tetramer, forming an 8-membered ring with alternating Cu-C bonds. In addition the four copper atoms form a planar Cu_{4} ring based on three-center two-electron bonds. The copper to copper bond length is 242 pm compared to 256 pm in bulk copper. In pentamesitylpentacopper a 5-membered copper ring is formed, similar to (2,4,6-trimethylphenyl)gold, and pentafluorophenylcopper is a tetramer.

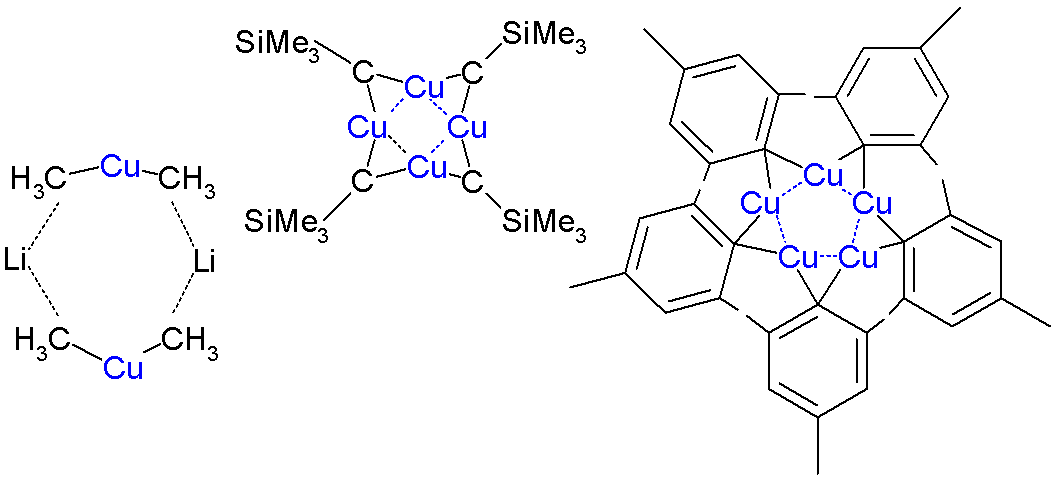

Lithium dimethylcuprate(I) is a dimer in diethyl ether, forming an 8-membered ring with two lithium atoms linking two methyl groups, (Li^{+}[Cu(CH_{3})_{2}]^{−})_{2}. Similarly, lithium diphenylcuprate(I) forms a dimeric etherate, ([Li(O(CH_{2}CH_{3})_{2})]^{+}[CuPh_{2}]^{−})_{2}, in the solid state.

=== Copper(III) ===
The involvement of the otherwise rare Cu(III) oxidation state has been demonstrated in the conjugate addition of the Gilman reagent to an enone: In a so-called rapid-injection NMR experiment at −100 °C, the Gilman reagent Li^{+}[Cu(CH_{3})_{2}]^{−} (stabilized by lithium iodide) was introduced to cyclohexenone (1) enabling the detection of the copper-alkene pi complex 2. On subsequent addition of trimethylsilyl cyanide the Cu(III) species 3 is formed (indefinitely stable at that temperature) and on increasing the temperature to −80 °C the conjugate addition product 4. According to an accompanying in silico experiments the Cu(III) intermediate has a square planar molecular geometry with the cyano group in cis orientation with respect to the cyclohexenyl methine group and anti-parallel to the methine proton. With other ligands than the cyano group this study predicts room temperature stable Cu(III) compounds.

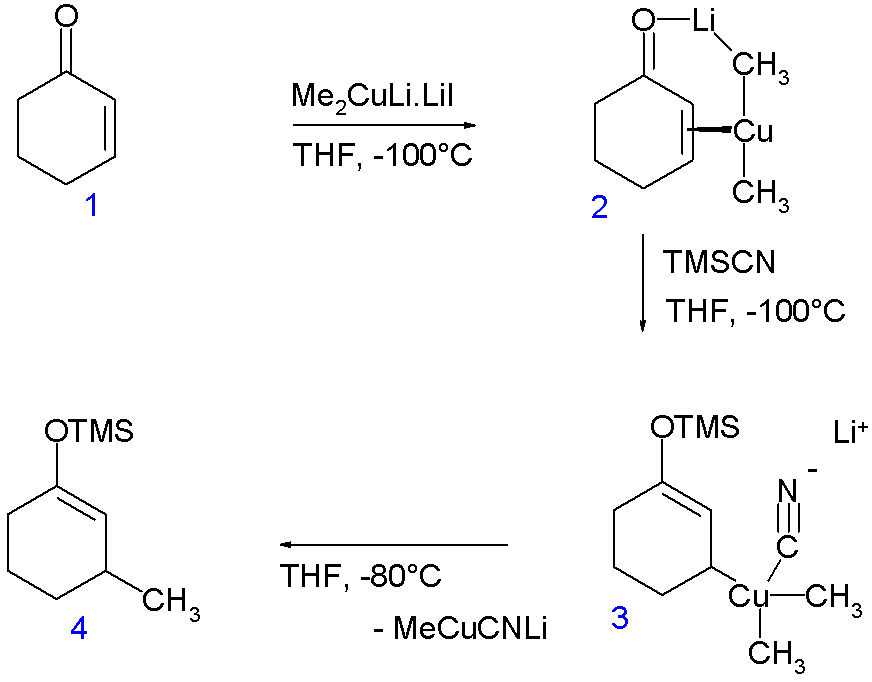

== Reactions of organocuprates ==
=== Cross-coupling reactions ===
Prior to the development of palladium-catalyzed cross coupling reactions, copper was the preferred catalyst for almost a century. Palladium offers a faster, more selective reaction. Copper reagents and catalysts continue to be the subject of innovation. Relative to palladium, copper is cheaper but the turnover numbers are often lower with copper and the reaction conditions more vigorous.

Reactions of Li^{+}[CuR_{2}]^{−} with alkyl halides R'−X give the coupling product:

Li^{+}[CuR_{2}]^{−} + R'−X → R−R' + CuR + LiX

The reaction mechanism involves oxidative addition (OA) of the alkyl halide to Cu(I), forming a planar Cu(III) intermediate, followed by reductive elimination (RE). The nucleophilic attack is the rate-determining step. In the substitution of iodide, a single-electron transfer mechanism is proposed (see figure).

$$[\ce{R}{-}{\color{Blue}\ce{Cu}}\ce{-R}]^-\ce{Li+}\ \xrightarrow{\color{Red}\ce{R'-X}}\ \left[\ce R{-}\overset{{\displaystyle \color{Red} \ce R'} \atop |}\underset{| \atop {\displaystyle \color{Red} \ce X}}{\color{Blue}\ce{Cu}}\ce{-R} \right]^-\ce{Li+} \ce{-> R}{-}{\color{Blue}\ce{Cu}} + \ce{R}{-}{\color{Red}\ce{R'}} + \ce{Li}{-}{\color{Red}\ce{X}}$$

Many electrophiles participate in this reaction. The approximate order of reactivity, beginning with the most reactive, is as follows: acid chlorides > aldehydes > tosylates ~ epoxides > iodides > bromides > chlorides > ketones > esters > nitriles >> alkenes

Generally the OA-RE mechanism is analogous to that of palladium-catalyzed cross coupling reactions. One difference between copper and palladium is that copper can undergo single-electron transfer processes.

=== Coupling reactions ===
Oxidative coupling is the coupling of copper acetylides to conjugated alkynes in the Glaser coupling (for example in the synthesis of cyclooctadecanonaene) or to aryl halides in the Castro-Stephens Coupling.

Reductive coupling is a coupling reaction of aryl halides with a stoichiometric equivalent of copper metal that occurs in the Ullmann reaction. A related reaction called decarboxylative cross-coupling, one coupling partner is a carboxylate. Cu(I) displaces a carboxyl forming the arylcopper (ArCu) intermediate. Simultaneously, a palladium catalyst reacts with an aryl bromide to give an organopalladium intermediate (Ar'PdB), which undergoes transmetallation to give ArPdAr', which in turn reductively eliminates the biaryl.

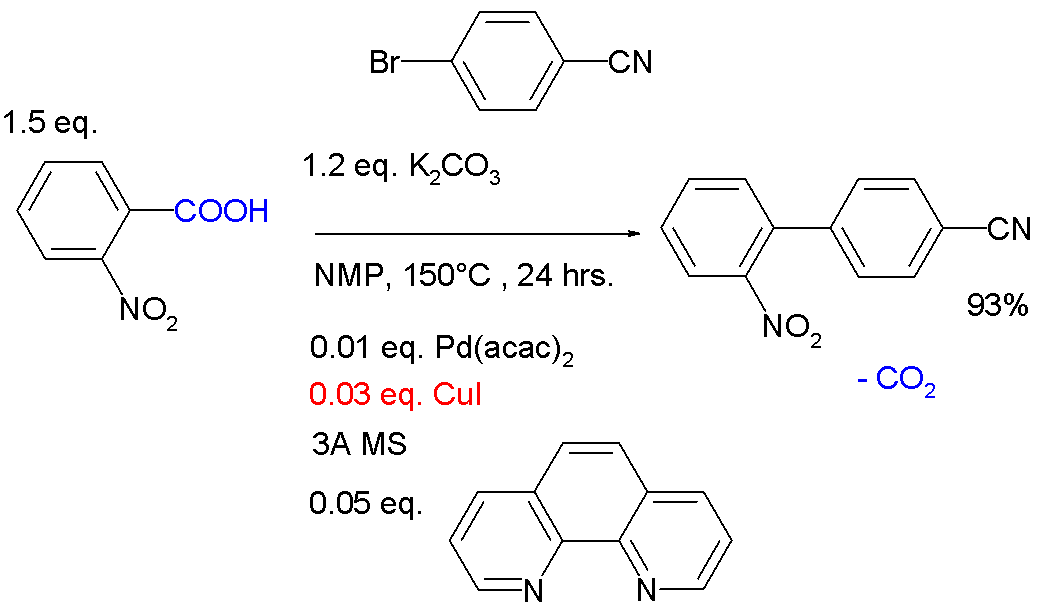

Redox neutral coupling is the coupling of terminal alkynes with halo-alkynes with a copper(I) salt in the Cadiot-Chodkiewicz coupling. Thermal coupling of two organocopper compounds is also possible.

=== Carbocupration ===
Carbocupration is a nucleophilic addition of organocopper reagents (R−Cu) to acetylene or terminal alkynes resulting in an alkenylcopper compound (R_{2}C=C(R)−Cu). It is a special case of carbometalation and also called the Normant reaction.

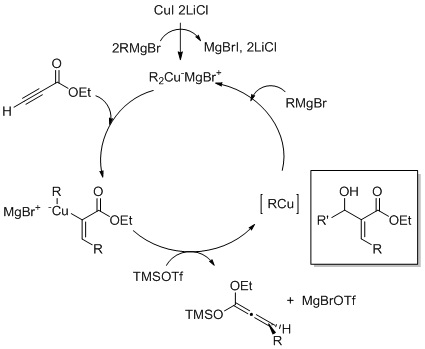
Catalytic cycle for carbocupration for the synthesis of aldol, Baylis-Hillman type products

== Synthetic applications ==
- The Chan-Lam coupling enables the formation of aryl carbon-hetoroatom bonds. It involves coupling of boronic acids, stannanes, or siloxanes with NH- or OH-containing substrates.
- Ullmann reaction involves copper-mediated reactions of aryl halides. Two types of Ullmann reaction are recognized:
  1. Classic copper-promoted synthesis of symmetric biaryl compounds)
  2. Copper-promoted nucleophilic aromatic substitution.
- Sonogashira coupling reaction, which utilizes both copper and palladium, entails the coupling of aryl and/or vinyl halides with terminal alkynes.

=== Reducing agents ===
Copper hydrides are specialized reducing agents. The well-known copper hydride is Stryker's reagent, with the formula [(PPh_{3})CuH]_{6}. It reduces the alkene portion of α,β-Unsaturated carbonyl compounds. A related but catalytic reaction uses copper(I) NHC complex with hydride equivalents provided by a hydrosilane.

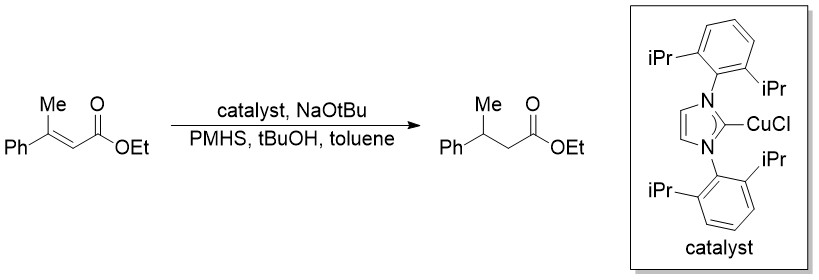

=== Copper alkylation reaction ===
Generally, the alkylation reaction of organocopper reagents proceed via gamma- alkylation. Cis- gamma attack occurs better in cyclohexyl carbamate due to sterics. The reaction is reported to be favorable in ethereal solvents. This method was proved to be very effective for the oxidative coupling of amines and alkyl, including tert-butyl, and aryl halides.

=== Vicinal functionalization reactions ===
Vicinal functionalization using a carbocupration/Mukaiyama aldol reaction sequence:

Muller and collaborators reported a vicinal functionalization of α,β-acetylenic esters using a carbocupration/Mukaiyama aldol reaction sequence (as shown in the figure above) carbocupration favors the formation of the Z-aldol.

== See also ==
- Ethyl copper
