= Copper bromide =

Copper bromide can refer to:

- Copper(I) bromide, CuBr
- Copper(II) bromide, CuBr_{2}
