= Acetylide =

Organic compounds containing a metal bound to a triple-bonded carbon

In chemistry, an acetylide is a compound that can be viewed as the result of replacing one or both hydrogen atoms of acetylene (ethyne) HC≡CH by metallic or other cations. Calcium carbide is an important industrial compound, which has long been used to produce acetylene for welding and illumination. It is also a major precursor to vinyl chloride. Other acetylides are reagents in organic synthesis.

== Nomenclature ==
The term acetylide is used loosely. It applies to an acetylene RC≡CM, where R = H or a side chain that is usually organic. The nomenclature can be ambiguous with regards to the distinction between compounds of the types MC_{2}R and M_{2}C_{2}. When both hydrogens of acetylene are replaced by metals, the compound can also be called carbide, e.g., calcium carbide Ca^{2+}[^{−}C≡C^{−}], which is calcium acetylide. When only one hydrogen atom is replaced, the anion may be called hydrogen acetylide or the prefix mono- may be attached to the metal, as in monosodium acetylide or sodium hydrogen acetylide, Na^{+}[^{−}C≡CH]. Metal acetylide may be described as salts, but that description rarely comports with crystallographic analysis.

== Structure ==
=== Alkali and alkaline earth acetylides ===
In the absence of additional ligands, metal acetylides adopt polymeric structures wherein the acetylide groups are bridging ligands. Alkali metal acetylides have the general formula [M_{2}C_{2} (M = Li, Na, K, etc).They are sometimes represented as [M^{+}]_{2}[^{−}C≡C^{−}] but the C---M bonding might also be described as polar covalent. They dissolve without decomposition in ammonia. Such solutions are proposed to contain solvated ^{−}C≡C^{−} ions.

Alkali metal and alkaline earth metal acetylides have the general formula [M'C_{2} (M' = Mg, Ca, etc). Rather than salt-like, they can be considered Zintl phase compounds, containing ^{−}C≡C^{−} ions, with a triple bond between the two carbon atoms. They undergo ready hydrolysis to form acetylene and metal oxides:

CaC_{2} + 2 H_{2}O → Ca(OH)_{2} + C_{2}H_{2}

The ^{−}C≡C^{−} ion has a closed shell ground state of ^{1}Σ^{+}_{g}, making it isoelectronic to a neutral molecule N_{2}, which may afford it some gas-phase stability.

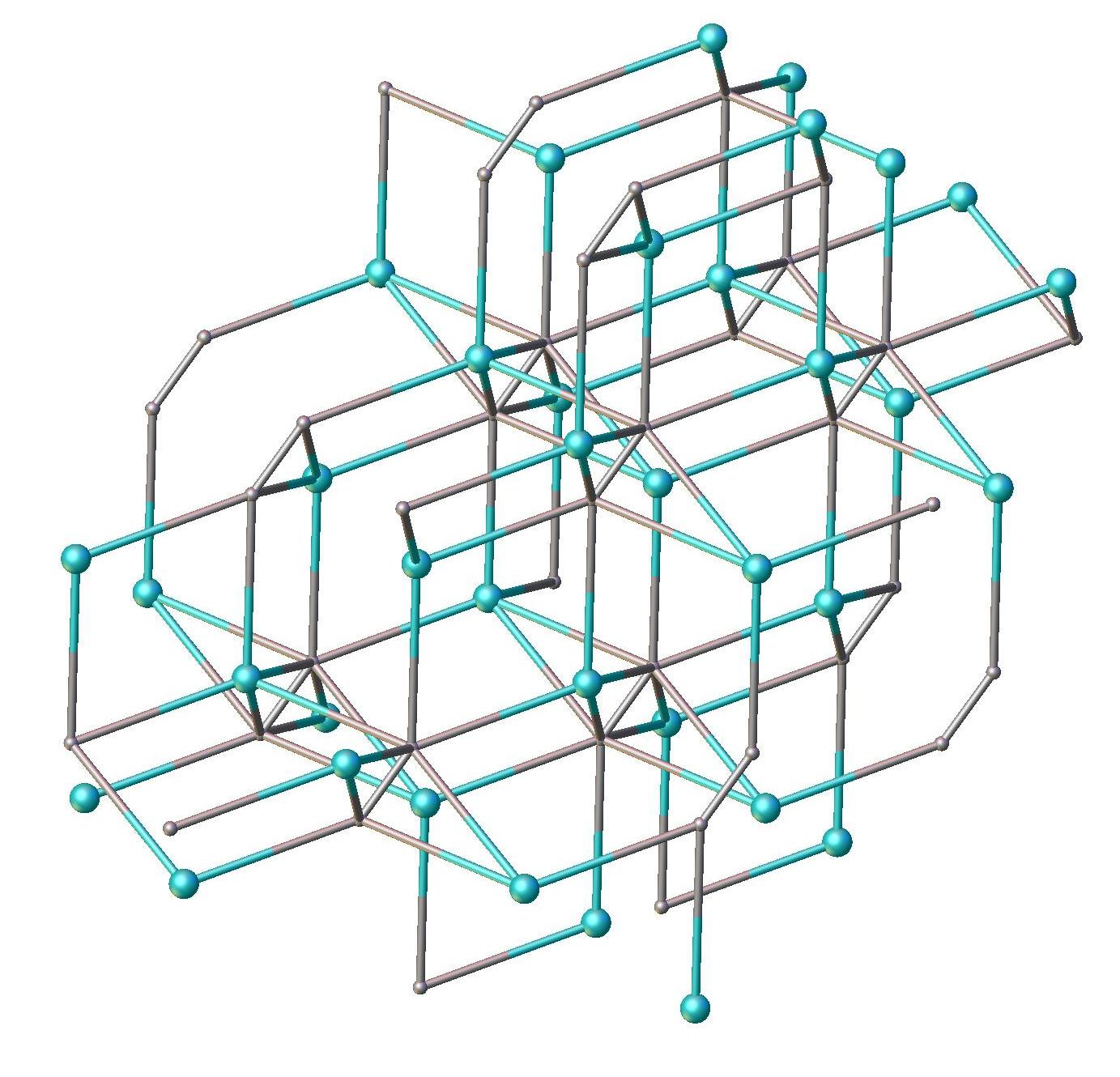
Structure of sodium acetylide [Na^{+}]_{2}[^{−}C≡C^{−}]. Color code: gray = C, blue = Na.

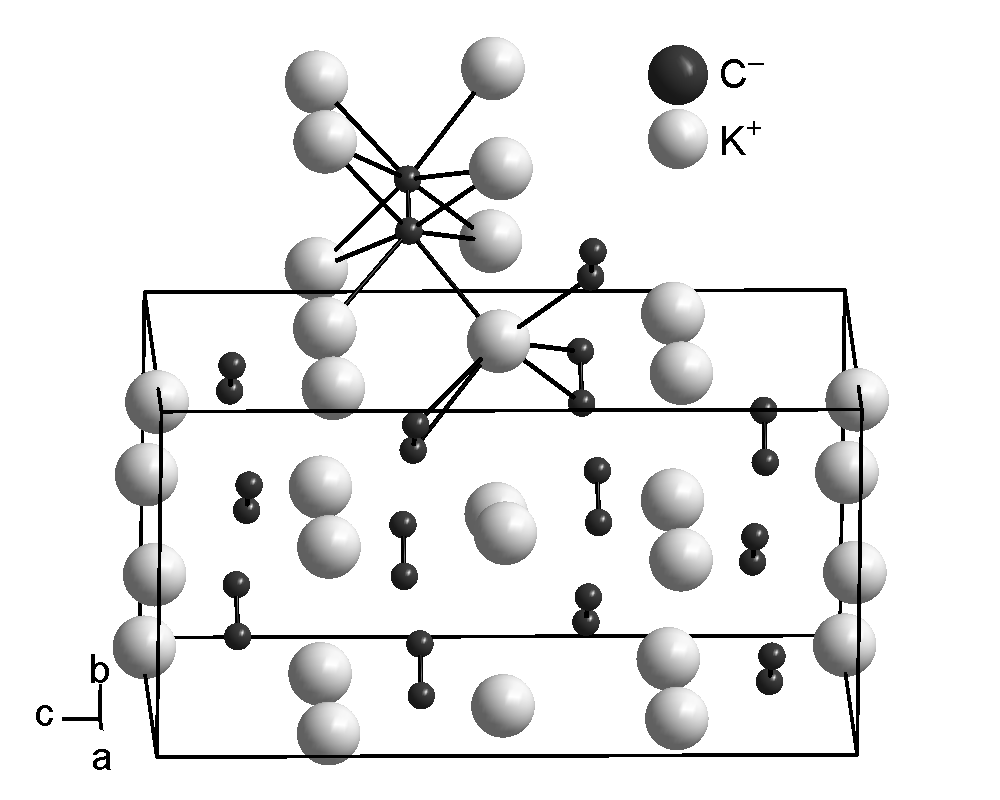
Structure and unit cell of potassium acetylide [K^{+}]_{2}[^{−}C≡C^{−}].

Structure of the cluster formed from PhC≡CLi complexed to N,N,N′,N′-tetramethyl-1,6-diaminohexane (methylene groups omitted for clarity). Color key: turquoise = Li, blue = N.

=== Transition metal acetylides ===
Acetylides of the transition metals, show evidence of covalent character, e. g. for being neither dissolved nor decomposed by water and by radically different chemical reactions. Even the stoichiometrically simple silver acetylide and copper acetylide appear highly covalent. The inventory of such complexes numbers in the hundreds.

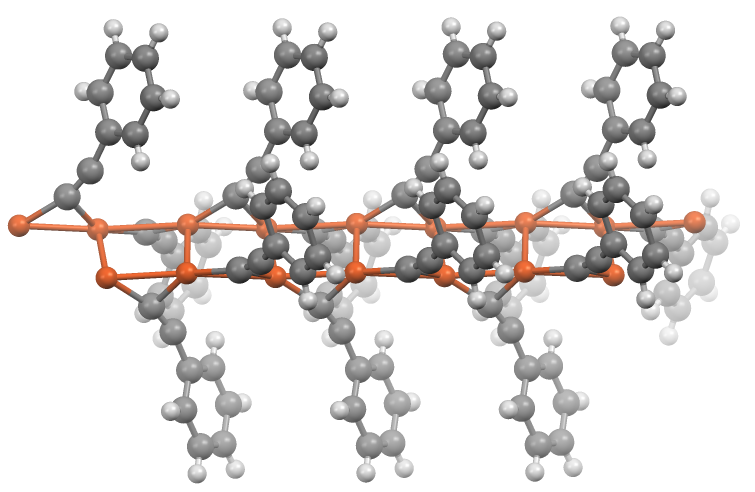
Portion of the structure of the polymer copper(I) phenylacetylide Cu^{+}[^{−}C≡C−C_{6}H_{5}].

The acetylide π* antibonding orbitals are generally too high-energy for substantial metal-ligand backbonding, but still do hybridize with the metal d orbitals. Consequently metal-to-ligand charge transfer excitations lie at low levels in the compounds' spectra.

== Preparation ==
=== Of the type MC≡CR ===
Acetylene and terminal alkynes are weak acids:

RC≡CH + R″M ⇌ R″H + RC≡CM

Monopotassium and monosodium acetylide can be prepared by reacting acetylene with bases like sodium amide or with the elemental metals, often at room temperature and atmospheric pressure. Copper(I) acetylide can be prepared by passing acetylene through an aqueous solution of copper(I) chloride because of a low solubility equilibrium. Similarly, silver acetylides can be obtained from silver nitrate.

In organic synthesis, acetylides are usually prepared by treating acetylene and alkynes with organometallic or inorganic bases. Classically, liquid ammonia was used as solvent for deprotonations, but ethers are now more commonly used.

Lithium amide, LiHMDS, or organolithium reagents, such as butyllithium (BuLi), are frequently used to form lithium acetylides:

HC≡CH + BuLi → LiC≡CH + BuH

=== Of the type MC≡CM and CaC_{2} ===
Calcium carbide is prepared industrially by heating carbon with lime (calcium oxide) at approximately 2,000 °C. A similar process can be used to produce lithium carbide.

Dilithium acetylide, Li_{2}C_{2}, competes with the preparation of the monolithium derivative LiC_{2}H.

== Reactions ==
Ionic acetylides are typically decomposed by water with evolution of acetylene:

Ca^{2+}[^{−}C≡C^{−}] + 2 H_{2}O → Ca(OH)_{2} + HC≡CH

RC≡C^{−}Na^{+} + H_{2}O → RC≡CH + NaOH

Acetylides of the type RC≡CM are widely used in alkynylations in organic chemistry. They are nucleophiles that add to a variety of electrophilic and unsaturated substrates.

A classic application is the Favorskii reaction, such as in the sequence shown below. Here ethyl propiolate is deprotonated by n-butyllithium to give the corresponding lithium acetylide. This acetylide adds to the carbonyl center of cyclopentanone. Hydrolysis liberates the alkynyl alcohol.

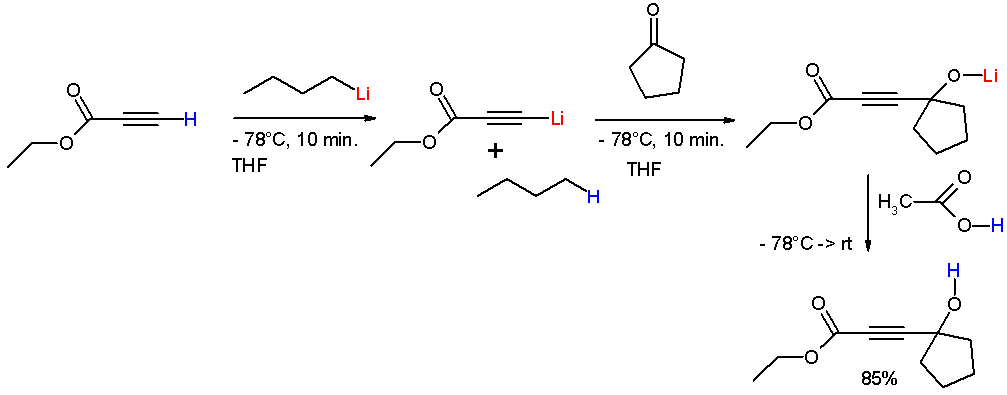
Reaction of ethyl propiolate with n-butyllithium to form the lithium acetylide.

The dimerization of acetylene to vinylacetylene proceeds by insertion of acetylene into a copper(I) acetylide complex.

=== Coupling reactions ===
The copper-catalyzed Click reaction of terminal alkynes and azides proceeds via copper(I) acetylide intermediates.

Acetylides are sometimes used as intermediates in coupling reactions. Examples include Sonogashira coupling, Cadiot-Chodkiewicz coupling, Glaser coupling and Eglinton coupling.

== Hazards ==
Some acetylides are notoriously explosive. Formation of acetylides poses a risk in handling of gaseous acetylene in presence of metals such as mercury, silver or copper, or alloys with their high content (brass, bronze, silver solder).

== See also ==
- Sodium hydrogen acetylide
- Calcium acetylide
- Strontium acetylide
- Barium acetylide
- Copper(I) acetylide
- Silver(I) acetylide
- Ethynyl
- Ethynyl radical
- Diatomic carbon (neutral C_{2})
- Acetylenediol
