= 1,4-Pentadiyne =

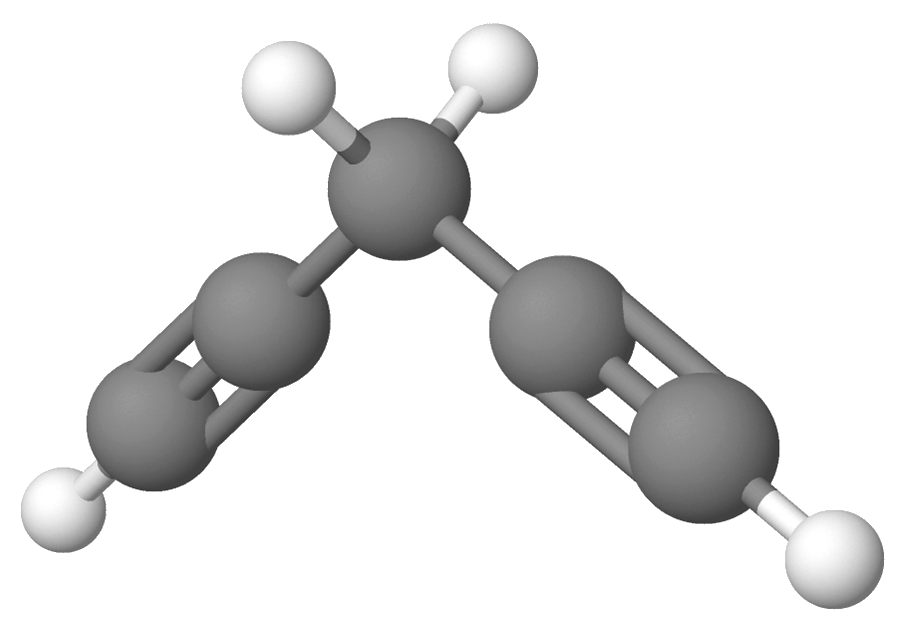

Names
- Preferred IUPAC name Penta-1,4-diyne

Identifiers
CAS Number	24442-69-1
3D model (JSmol)	Interactive image
ChemSpider	124473
PubChem CID	141112
CompTox Dashboard (EPA)	DTXSID20179202
- InChI: InChI=1S/C5H4/c1-3-5-4-2/h1-2H,5H2 Key: MDROPVLMRLHTDK-UHFFFAOYSA-N
- SMILES: C#CCC#C

Properties
Chemical formula	C_{5}H_{4}
Molar mass	64.087 g·mol^{−1}
Appearance	colorless liquid
Melting point	−21 – −19 °C (−6 – −2 °F; 252–254 K)
Boiling point	61–64 °C (142–147 °F; 334–337 K)
Refractive index (n_{D})	1.4283 (23 °C)

Structure
Dipole moment	0.516 D
- Except where otherwise noted, data are given for materials in their standard state (at 25 °C [77 °F], 100 kPa). Infobox references

1,4-Pentadiyne (penta-1,4-diyne) is a chemical compound belonging to the alkynes. The compound is the structural isomer to 1,3-pentadiyne.

== Preparation ==
Until the late 1960s, no successful synthesis of this seemingly simply preparable molecule was described. Although long-chain and more complex 1,4-diynes had been synthesized successfully before, synthesis approaches starting from sodium acetylide or the acetylene Grignard reagent and propargyl bromide or methylene chloride failed, even with the inclusion of copper(I) chloride. Mostly 1,3-pentadiyne was obtained as rearrangement product.

The first successful isolation reacted propargyl bromide and ethynylmagnesium bromide, with a copper(I) chloride catalyst in THF. This gave a 70% yield in solution, but the product was difficult to separate from the solvent. Compared to previous attempts, the successful approach included an additional round of flash distillation and gas-liquid chromatography of the distillate.

An improved synthesis method was published by Verkruijsse and Hasselaar in 1979. Copper chloride was substituted by copper(I) bromide as well as propargyl bromide by propargyl tosylate. At lower reaction temperatures and fewer by-products, the alkiyne was obtained after multistep extraction. According to the publication’s authors, this circumvented the problem that the solvent THF and the main compound share similar boiling points.

Preparation of 1,4-pentadiyne by Verkruijsse and Hasselaar

Moreover, a flash vacuum pyrolysis starting from 3-ethynylcycloprop-1-ene at 550 °C yields the compound and penta-1,2-dien-4-yne as sideproduct.

Pyrolytic or photochemical decomposition of 3‑ethynylcycloprop-1‑ene gives 5:1 1,4‑pentadiyne and a dienyne sideproduct.

Alternatively, a photolytic decomposition of cyclopentadienylidene via UV radiation is possible.

The compounds forms also during the exothermic reaction of allene and the ethynyl radical. This reaction is mainly of interest for astrochemistry.

== Properties ==
At room temperature the substance discolors from a colorless to a yellowish liquid, however, storage in diluted solutions at 0 °C is possible for multiple weeks.

While for 1,4-pentadiene the sp^{2}-hybridization leads to a bond angle of 120° between the single and double bond, in 1,4-pentadiyne it is a 180° angle due to the sp-hybrid orbital. Both triple bonds in 1,4-position destabilize each other according to another study by 3.9 kcal · mol^{−1}, a repulsion between the p orbital lobes close to the sp^{3}-hybridized carbon has been postulated. According to a QCSID(T) calculation, the alkiyne is destabilized relative to 1,3-pentadiyne by 25 kcal · mol^{−1}.

Although microwave spectroscopy revealed besides a dipole moment of 0.516 D no significant distortions compared to an ideal tetrahedron, three different ionization energies are reported for the π-system.

== Usage ==
1,4-pentadiyne is a common starting material for the synthesis of heterobenzenes such as stiba-, arsa- and phosphabenzene and their substituted derivatives.

1,4-Pentadiin is used in the preparation of heterobenzenes
