= TMSA =

TMSA may refer to:

- Trimethylsilylacetylene, a chemical compound
- Tanker Management and Self-Assessment programme, developed by the Oil Companies International Marine Forum (OCIMF) to assess ship safety management systems
- Tobacco Master Settlement Agreement
- Thymosin α1, peptide hormone
- Transvaal Museum, South Africa
