= C5H4 =

The molecular formula C_{5}H_{4} (molar mass: 64.09 g/mol, exact mass: 64.0313 u) may refer to:

- 3-Ethynylcycloprop-1-ene
- 1,3-Pentadiyne
- 1,4-Pentadiyne
- Penta-1,2-dien-4-yne
- Spiropentadiene, or bowtiediene
