= Linear acetylenic carbon =

Polymer made of repeating –C≡C– units

General chemical structure of linear acetylenic carbon (carbyne)

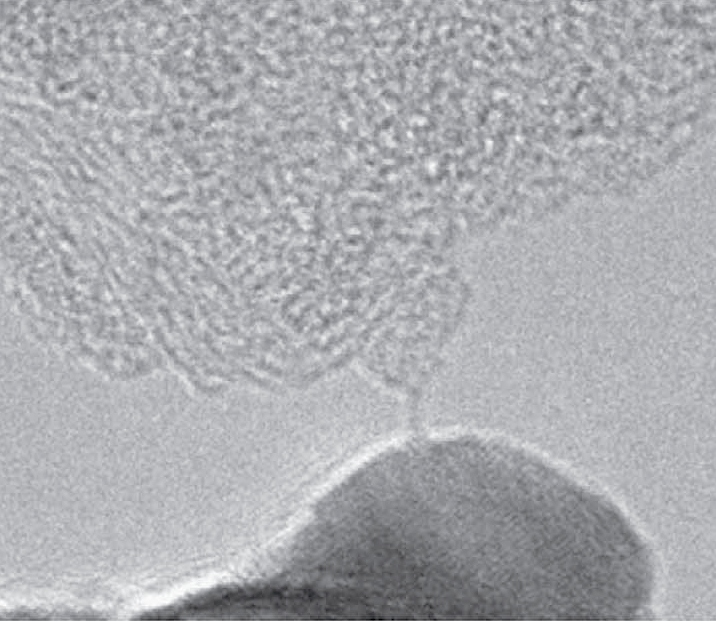
Electron micrograph of a linear carbon chain (carbyne) between a carbon lump and Fe electrode, approximately 36 nm wide image

Linear acetylenic carbon (LAC), also known as carbyne or a Linear Carbon Chain (LCC), is an allotrope of carbon that has the chemical structure (−C≡C−)_{n} as a repeat unit, with alternating single and triple bonds. It would thus be the ultimate member of the polyyne family.

This polymeric carbyne is of considerable interest to nanotechnology as its Young's modulus is 32.7 TPa – forty times that of diamond; this extraordinary number is, however, based on a novel definition of cross-sectional area that does not correspond to the space occupied by the structure. Carbyne has also been identified in interstellar space; however, its existence in condensed phases has been contested recently, as such chains would crosslink exothermically (and perhaps explosively) if they approached each other.

== History and controversy ==
The first claims of detection of this allotrope were made in 1960 and repeated in 1978. A 1982 re-examination of samples from several previous reports determined that the signals originally attributed to carbyne were in fact due to silicate impurities in the samples. No crystal structures of carbyne are known, as carbyne has not yet been made in pure solid form. This is indeed the major obstacle to general acceptance of carbyne as a true carbon allotrope.

During the past thirty five years an increasing body of experimental and theoretical work has been published in the scientific literature dealing with the preparation of carbyne and the study of its structure, properties and potential applications. In 1968 a silver-white new mineral was discovered in graphitic gneisses of the Ries Crater (Nordlingen, Bavaria, Germany). This material was found to consist entirely of carbon and its hexagonal cell dimensions matched those reported earlier for carbyne by Russian scientists. It was concluded that this novel form of natural carbon, chaoite, was generated from graphite by the combined action of high temperature and high pressure, presumably caused by the impact of meteorite. Soon afterwards this "white" carbon was synthesized by sublimation of pyrolytic graphite in vacuum.

In 1984, a group at Exxon reported the detection of clusters with even numbers of carbons, between 30 and 180, in carbon evaporation experiments, and attributed them to polyyne carbon. However, these clusters later were identified as fullerenes.

In 1991, carbyne was allegedly detected among various other allotropes of carbon in samples of amorphous carbon black vaporized and quenched by shock waves produced by shaped explosive charges.

In 1995, the preparation of carbyne chains with over 300 carbons was reported. They were claimed to be reasonably stable, even against moisture and oxygen, as long as the terminal alkynes on the chain are capped with inert groups (such as tert-butyl or trifluoromethyl) rather than hydrogen atoms. The study claimed that the data specifically indicated a carbyne-like structures rather than fullerene-like ones. However, according to H. Kroto, the properties and synthetic methods used in those studies are consistent with generation of fullerenes.

Another 1995 report claimed detection of carbyne chains of indeterminate length in a layer of carbonized material, about 180 nm thick, resulting from the reaction of solid polytetrafluoroethylene (PTFE, Teflon) immersed in alkali metal amalgam at ambient temperature (with no hydrogen-bearing species present). The assumed reaction was

(-CF_{2}−CF_{2}-)_{n} + 4M → (-C≡C-)_{n} + 4MF,

where M is either lithium, sodium, or potassium. The authors conjectured that nanocrystals of the metal fluoride between the chains prevented their polymerization.

In 1999, it was reported that copper(I) acetylide (Cu^{+}_{2} C^{2−}_{2}), after partial oxidation by exposure to air or copper(II) ions followed by decomposition with hydrochloric acid, leaves a "carbonaceous" residue with the spectral signature of (−C≡C−)_{n} chains with n=2–6. The proposed mechanism involves oxidative polymerization of the acetylide anions C^{2−}_{2} into carbyne-type anions C(≡C−C≡)_{n}C^{2−} or cumulene-type anions C(=C=C=)_{m}C^{4−}. Also, thermal decomposition of copper acetylide in vacuum yielded a fluffy deposit of fine carbon powder on the walls of the flask, which, on the basis of spectral data, was claimed to be carbyne rather than graphite. Finally, the oxidation of copper acetylide in ammoniacal solution (Glaser's reaction) produces a carbonaceous residue that was claimed to consist of "polyacetylide" anions capped with residual copper(I) ions,

Cu^{+} C^{−}(≡C−C≡)_{n}C^{−} Cu^{+}.

On the basis of the residual amount of copper, the mean number of units n was estimated to be around 230.

In 2004, an analysis of a synthesized linear carbon allotrope found it to have a cumulene electronic structure—sequential double bonds along an sp-hybridized carbon chain—rather than the alternating triple–single pattern of linear carbyne.

In 2016, the synthesis of linear chains of up to 6,000 sp-hybridized carbon atoms was reported. The chains were grown inside double-walled carbon nanotubes, and are highly stable protected by their hosts.

=== Polyynes ===
While the existence of "carbyne" chains in pure neutral carbon material is still disputed, short (−C≡C−)_{n} chains are well established as substructures of larger molecules (polyynes). As of 2010, the longest such chain in a stable molecule had 22 acetylenic units (44 atoms), stabilized by rather bulky end groups.

== Structure ==
The carbon atoms in this form are each linear in geometry with sp orbital hybridisation. The estimated length of the bonds is 120.7 pm (triple) and 137.9 pm (single).

Other possible configurations for a chain of carbon atoms include polycumulene (polyethylene-diylidene) chains with double bonds only (128.2 pm). This chain is expected to have slightly higher energy, with a Peierls gap of 2–5 eV. For short C_{n} molecules, however, the polycumulene structure seems favored. When n is even, two ground configurations, very close in energy, may coexist: one linear, and one cyclic (rhombic).

The limits of flexibility of the carbyne chain are illustrated by a synthetic polyyne with a backbone of 8 acetylenic units, whose chain was found to be bent by 25° or more (about 3° at each carbon) in the solid state, to accommodate the bulky end groups of adjacent molecules.

The highly symmetric carbyne chain is expected to have only one Raman-active mode with Σ_{g} symmetry, due to stretching of bonds in each single-double pair, with frequency typically between 1800 and 2300 cm^{−1}, and affected by their environments.

== Properties ==
Carbyne chains have been claimed to be the strongest material known per density. Calculations indicate that carbyne's specific tensile strength (strength divided by density) of (6.0–7.5)×10^{7} (N⋅m)/kg beats graphene ((4.7–5.5)×10^{7} (N⋅m)/kg), carbon nanotubes ((4.3–5.0)×10^{7} (N⋅m)/kg), and diamond ((2.5–6.5)×10^{7} (N⋅m)/kg). Its specific modulus (Young's Modulus divided by density) of around 10^{9} (N⋅m)/kg is also double that of graphene, which is around 4.5×10^{8} (N⋅m)/kg.

Stretching carbyne 10% alters its electronic band gap from 3.2–4.4 eV. Outfitted with molecular handles at chain's ends, it can also be twisted to alter its band gap. With a 90° end-to-end twist, carbyne turns into a magnetic semiconductor.

In 2017, the band gaps of confined linear carbon chains (LCC) inside double-walled carbon nanotubes with lengths ranging from 36 up to 6000 carbon atoms were determined for the first time ranging from 2.253–1.848 eV, following a linear relation with Raman frequency. This lower bound is the smallest band gap of linear carbon chains observed so far. In 2020, the strength (Young's modulus) of linear carbon chains (LCC) was experimentally calculated to be about 20 TPa which is much higher than that of other carbon materials like graphene and carbon nanotubes. The comparison with experimental data obtained for short chains in gas phase or in solution demonstrates the effect of the DWCNT encapsulation, leading to an essential downshift of the band gap.

The LCCs inside double-walled carbon nanotubes lead to an increase of the photoluminescence (PL) signal of the inner tubes up to a factor of 6 for tubes with (8,3) chirality. This behavior can be attributed to a local charge transfer from the inner tubes to the carbon chains, counterbalancing quenching mechanisms induced by the outer tubes.

Carbyne chains can take on side molecules that may make the chains suitable for energy and hydrogen storage.

With a differential Raman scattering cross section of 10^{−22} cm^{2} sr^{−1} per atom, carbyne chains confined inside carbon nanotubes are the strongest Raman scatterer ever reported, exceeding any other know material by two orders of magnitude.
