= 2-Methylbut-3-yn-2-ol =

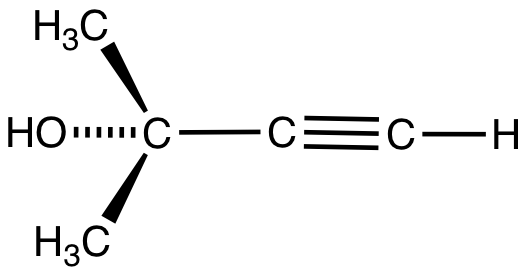

Names
- Preferred IUPAC name 2-Methylbut-3-yn-2-ol
- Other names: Ethynylmethylcarbinol; Dimethylethynylcarbinol; 1,1-Dimethyl-2-propyn-1-ol; Dimethylethynylmethanol; MB; Mebynol

Identifiers
CAS Number	115-19-5
3D model (JSmol)	Interactive image
ChEMBL	ChEMBL3185871
ChemSpider	21106133
ECHA InfoCard	100.003.700
EC Number	204-070-5
PubChem CID	8258
RTECS number	ES0810000
UNII	EHB904XHKH
UN number	1987
CompTox Dashboard (EPA)	DTXSID2021949
- InChI: InChI=1S/C5H8O/c1-4-5(2,3)6/h1,6H,2-3H3 Key: CEBKHWWANWSNTI-UHFFFAOYSA-N
- SMILES: CC(C)(C#C)O

Properties
Chemical formula	C_{5}H_{8}O
Molar mass	84.118 g·mol^{−1}
Appearance	Colorless liquid
Density	0.8637 g/cm^{3}
Melting point	3 °C (37 °F; 276 K)
Boiling point	104 °C (219 °F; 377 K)
Solubility in water	good

Hazards
- GHS labelling
Pictograms	(GHS02: Flammable) (GHS05: Corrosive) (GHS07: Exclamation mark) (GHS08: Health hazard)
Signal word	Danger
Hazard statements	H225, H226, H302, H315, H318, H319, H335, H361
Precautionary statements	P201, P202, P210, P233, P240, P241, P242, P243, P261, P264, P270, P271, P280, P281, P301+P312, P302+P352, P303+P361+P353, P304+P340, P305+P351+P338, P308+P313, P310, P312, P321, P330, P332+P313, P337+P313, P362, P370+P378, P403+P233, P403+P235, P405, P501
Flash point	20 °C (68 °F; 293 K)
- Except where otherwise noted, data are given for materials in their standard state (at 25 °C [77 °F], 100 kPa). Infobox references

2-Methylbut-3-yn-2-ol is the organic compound with the formula HC_{2}C(OH)Me_{2} (Me = CH_{3}). A colorless liquid, it is classified as an alkynyl alcohol.

== Preparation and use ==
It arises from the condensation of acetylene and acetone. The addition can be promoted with base (Favorskii reaction) or with Lewis acid catalysts. 2-Methylbut-3-yn-2-ol is produced on an industrial scale as a precursor to terpenes and terpenoids.

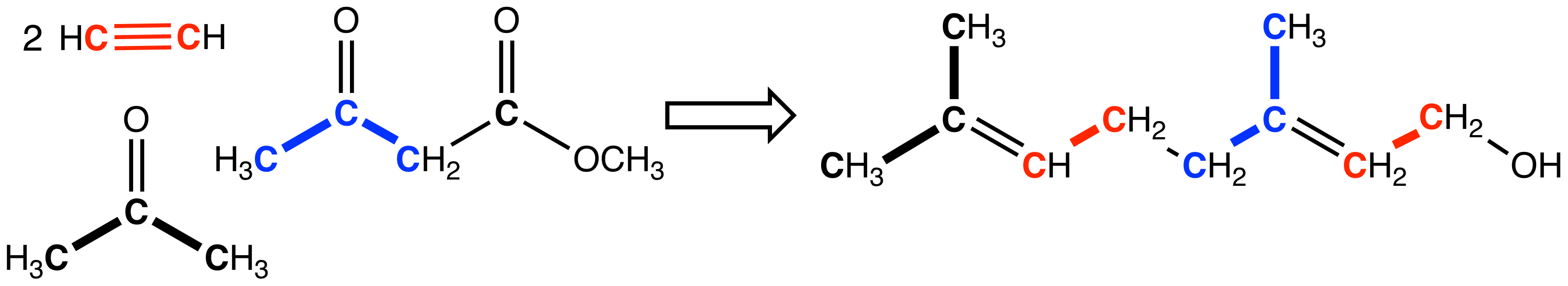
2-Methylbut-3-yn-2-ol is an intermediate in this industrial route to geraniol.

2-Methylbut-3-yn-2-ol also is used as a monoprotected version of acetylene. For example, after arylation at carbon, the acetone can be removed with base:

HC_{2}C(OH)Me_{2} + ArX + base → ArC_{2}C(OH)Me_{2} + [Hbase]X
ArC_{2}C(OH)Me_{2} → ArC_{2}H + OCMe_{2}

In this regard, 2-methylbut-3-yn-2-ol is used similarly to trimethylsilylacetylene.
