= Diphenylbutadiyne =

Names
- IUPAC name 4-phenylbuta-1,3-diynylbenzene
- Other names diphenyldiacetylene

Identifiers
CAS Number	886-66-8
3D model (JSmol)	Interactive image
ChEBI	CHEBI:51588
ChemSpider	63360
ECHA InfoCard	100.011.776
EC Number	212-953-1
PubChem CID	70174
UNII	84WV7G15RN
CompTox Dashboard (EPA)	DTXSID8061264
- InChI: InChI=1S/C16H10/c1-3-9-15(10-4-1)13-7-8-14-16-11-5-2-6-12-16/h1-6,9-12H Key: HMQFJYLWNWIYKQ-UHFFFAOYSA-N
- SMILES: C1=CC=C(C=C1)C#CC#CC2=CC=CC=C2

Properties
Chemical formula	C_{16}H_{10}
Molar mass	202.256 g·mol^{−1}
Appearance	white solid
Density	1.936 g/cm^{3}
Melting point	86–87 °C (187–189 °F; 359–360 K)

Hazards
- GHS labelling
Pictograms	(GHS07: Exclamation mark)
Signal word	Warning
Hazard statements	H315, H319, H335
Precautionary statements	P261, P264, P264+P265, P271, P280, P302+P352, P304+P340, P305+P351+P338, P319, P321, P332+P317, P337+P317, P362+P364, P403+P233, P405, P501
- Except where otherwise noted, data are given for materials in their standard state (at 25 °C [77 °F], 100 kPa). Infobox references

Diphenylbutadiyne is the hydrocarbon with the formula (C_{6}H_{5}C_{2})_{2}. It is a member of the diyne chemical class and can be made via the Glaser coupling of phenylacetylene However, a variety of other synthesis methods have been developed.

Diphenylbutadiyne forms a variety of metal-alkyne complexes. One example is the organonickel complex (C_{5}H_{5}Ni)_{4}C_{4}(C_{6}H_{5})_{2}.
