= Cadiot–Chodkiewicz coupling =

Reaction in organic chemistry

Named after	Paul Cadiot; Wladyslaw Chodkiewicz
Reaction type	Coupling reaction

Identifiers
Organic Chemistry Portal	cadiot-chodkiewicz-coupling
RSC ontology ID	RXNO:0000100

The Cadiot–Chodkiewicz coupling in organic chemistry is a coupling reaction between a terminal alkyne and a haloalkyne catalyzed by a copper(I) salt such as copper(I) bromide and an amine base. The reaction product is a 1,3-diyne or di-alkyne.

The reaction mechanism involves deprotonation by base of the terminal alkyne proton followed by formation of a copper(I) acetylide. A cycle of oxidative addition and reductive elimination on the copper centre then creates a new carbon-carbon bond.

== Scope ==
Unlike the related Glaser coupling the Cadiot–Chodkiewicz coupling proceeds selectively and will only couple the alkyne to the haloalkyne, giving a single product. By comparison the Glaser coupling would simply produce a distribution of all possible couplings. In one study the Cadiot–Chodkiewicz coupling has been applied in the synthesis of acetylene macrocycles starting from cis-1,4-diethynyl-1,4-dimethoxycyclohexa-2,5-diene. This compound is also the starting material for the dibromide through N-bromosuccinimide (NBS) and silver nitrate:

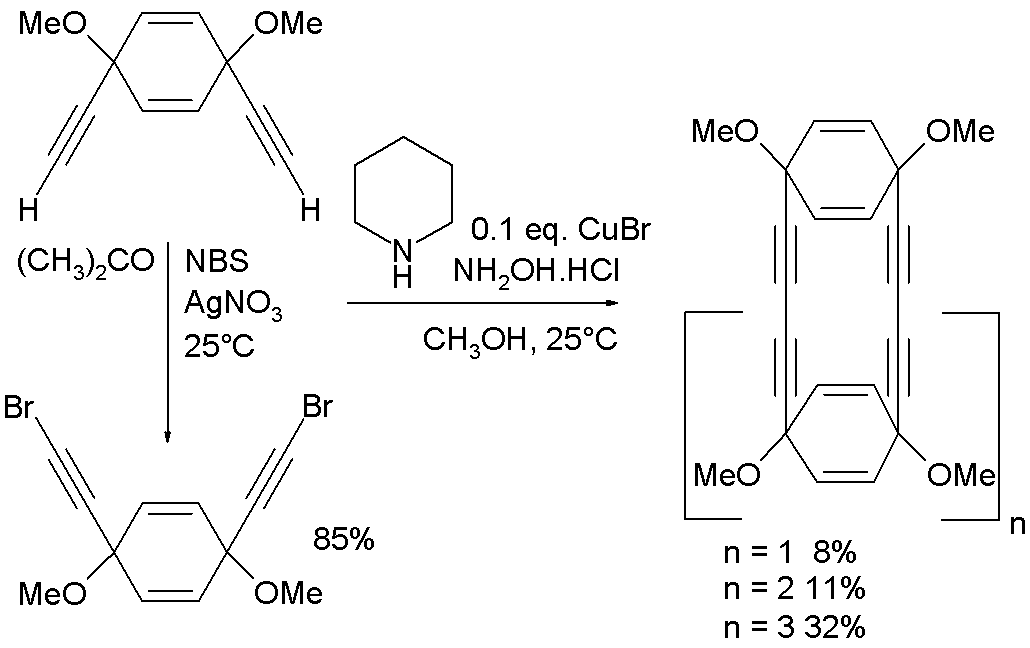
Cadiot–Chodkiewicz coupling application

The coupling reaction itself takes place in methanol with piperidine, the hydrochloric acid salt of hydroxylamine and copper(I) bromide.

== See also ==
- Glaser coupling – Another alkyne coupling reaction catalysed by a copper(I) salt.
- Sonogashira coupling – Pd/Cu catalysed coupling of an alkyne with an aryl or vinyl halide
- Castro–Stephens coupling – A cross-coupling reaction between a copper(I) acetylide and an aryl halide
