= Ethyl copper =

Identifiers
CAS Number	18365-11-2
3D model (JSmol)	Interactive image
ChemSpider	9553360
PubChem CID	15975389
CompTox Dashboard (EPA)	DTXSID20463971
- InChI: InChI=1S/C2H5.Cu/c1-2;/h1H2,2H3;/q-1;+1 Key: GDVQAJIJTGEYHX-UHFFFAOYSA-N
- SMILES: C[CH2-].[Cu+]

Properties
Chemical formula	C_{2}H_{5}Cu
Molar mass	92.608 g·mol^{−1}
Appearance	Green crystalline solid
- Except where otherwise noted, data are given for materials in their standard state (at 25 °C [77 °F], 100 kPa). Infobox references

Ethyl copper (CuC_{2}H_{5}) is an organocopper compound consisting of copper in its +1 oxidation state (cuprous) bound to an ethyl group. It can be generated by transmetallation by the reaction of copper(I) acetate with tetraethyl lead:

CuOAc + Pb(C_{2}H_{5})_{4} → CuC_{2}H_{5} + Pb(C_{2}H_{5})_{3}OAc

== Related compounds ==
Methyl copper was obtained from methyl lithium and copper(I) iodide at low temperature.

A copper ethyl complex has been characterized by X-ray crystallography.

== See also ==
- Phenylcopper
- Gilman reagent
