= Chaoite =

Carbon mineral whose existence is disputed

General
- Category: Native element mineral
- Formula: C
- IMA symbol: Ch
- Strunz classification: 1.CB.05b
- Crystal system: Hexagonal
- Crystal class: Dihexagonal dipyramidal (6/mmm); H-M symbol: (6/m 2/m 2/m)
- Space group: P6/mmm
- Unit cell: a = 8.948 Å, c = 14.078 Å; Z = 168

Identification
- Colour: Black
- Crystal habit: Thin 3-15 μm intergrowth lamellae with graphite
- Mohs scale hardness: 1 - 2
- Lustre: Submetallic
- Diaphaneity: Opaque
- Specific gravity: 3.43 (calculated)

Chaoite, or white carbon, is a mineral described as an allotrope of carbon, whose existence is disputed. It was discovered in shock-fused graphite gneiss from the Ries crater in Bavaria. It has been described as slightly harder than graphite, with a reflection colour of grey to white. From its electron diffraction pattern, the mineral has been considered to have a carbyne structure, the linear acetylenic carbon allotrope of carbon. A later report has called this identification, and the very existence of carbyne phases, into question, arguing that the new reflections in the diffraction pattern are due to clay impurities.

== Synthetic material ==
It has been claimed that an identical form can be prepared from graphite by sublimation at 2700-3000 K or by irradiating it with a laser in high vacuum. This substance has been termed ceraphite.

A review cautions that "in spite of these seemingly definitive reports … several other groups have tried unsuccessfully to reproduce these experiments. Independent confirmatory work is obviously needed … and at the present time white graphite appears to be the carbon analog of polywater".

== Occurrence and discovery ==
Chaoite was first described from Möttingen, Ries Crater, Nördlingen, Bavaria, Germany and approved by the IMA in 1969. The mineral was named for USGS petrologist Edward C. T. Chao (1919–2008). At the type locality in Bavaria chaoite occurs in graphite bearing gneiss that has undergone shock metamorphism. It has also been reported from meteorites including the Goalpara meteorite in Assam, the Dyalpur meteorite in Uttar Pradesh in India and the Popigai impact structure in the Anabarskii massif of Eastern Siberia. Minerals associated with chaoite include: graphite, zircon, rutile, pseudobrookite, magnetite, nickeliferous pyrrhotite and baddeleyite.

== See also ==
- Glossary of meteoritics
