= Copper(II) bromide =

Copper (II) bromide
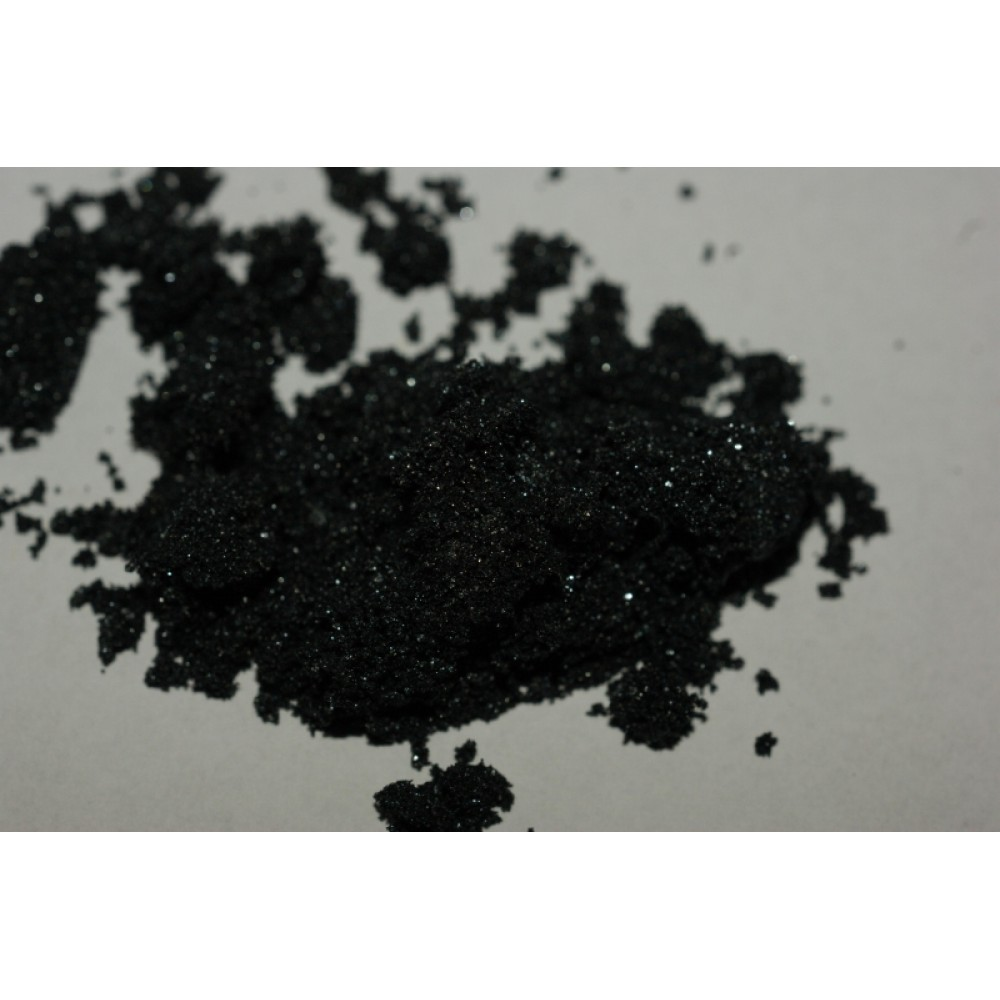
- Anhydrous

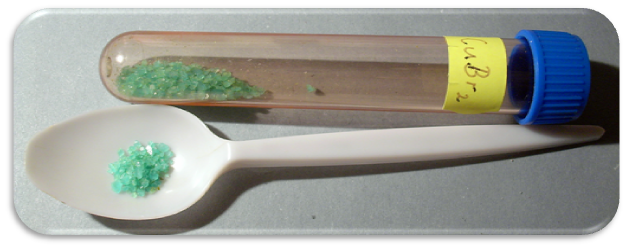
- Tetrahydrate

Names
- Other names Cupric bromide Copper dibromide

Identifiers
CAS Number	7789-45-9
3D model (JSmol)	Interactive image
ChemSpider	8395631
ECHA InfoCard	100.029.243
EC Number	232-167-2
PubChem CID	24611
UNII	1KC430K0ZN
CompTox Dashboard (EPA)	DTXSID7064863
- InChI: InChI=1S/2BrH.Cu/h2*1H;/q;;+2/p-2 Key: QTMDXZNDVAMKGV-UHFFFAOYSA-L; InChI=1/2BrH.Cu/h2*1H;/q;;+2/p-2 Key: QTMDXZNDVAMKGV-NUQVWONBAD
- SMILES: [Cu+2].[Br-].[Br-]

Properties
Chemical formula	CuBr_{2}
Molar mass	223.37 g/mol
Appearance	grayish black crystals deliquescent
Density	4.710 g/cm^{3}, solid
Melting point	498 °C (928 °F; 771 K)
Boiling point	900 °C (1,650 °F; 1,170 K)
Solubility in water	55.7 g/100 mL (20 °C)
Solubility	Soluble in alcohol, acetone, ammonia, insoluble in benzene, ether, sulfuric acid
Magnetic susceptibility (χ)	+685.5·10^{−6} cm^{3}/mol

Structure
Crystal structure	monoclinic

Hazards
- GHS labelling
Pictograms	(GHS05: Corrosive) (GHS07: Exclamation mark) (GHS09: Environmental hazard)
Signal word	Danger
Hazard statements	H302, H314, H410
Precautionary statements	P260, P264, P264+P265, P270, P273, P280, P301+P317, P301+P330+P331, P302+P361+P354, P304+P340, P305+P354+P338, P316, P317, P321, P330, P363, P391, P405, P501
NFPA 704 (fire diamond)	2 0 0
- NIOSH (US health exposure limits)
PEL (Permissible)	TWA 1 mg/m^{3} (as Cu)
REL (Recommended)	TWA 1 mg/m^{3} (as Cu)
IDLH (Immediate danger)	TWA 100 mg/m^{3} (as Cu)

Related compounds
Other anions	Copper(II) fluoride Copper(II) chloride
Other cations	Copper(I) bromide Nickel(II) bromide Zinc bromide Cadmium bromide Mercury(II) bromide
- Except where otherwise noted, data are given for materials in their standard state (at 25 °C [77 °F], 100 kPa). verify (what is ?) Infobox references

Copper(II) bromide (CuBr_{2}) is a chemical compound that forms a tetrahydrate CuBr_{2}·4H_{2}O. It is used in photographic processing as an intensifier and as a brominating agent in organic synthesis.

It is also used in the copper vapor laser, a class of laser where the medium is copper bromide vapour formed in-situ from hydrogen bromide reacting with the copper discharge tube. Producing yellow or green light, it is used in dermatological applications.

== Occurrence ==
As of 2020, pure copper(II) bromide is unknown among minerals. However, barlowite, Cu_{4}BrF(OH)_{6}, contains both copper and bromide.

== Molecular and crystal structure ==
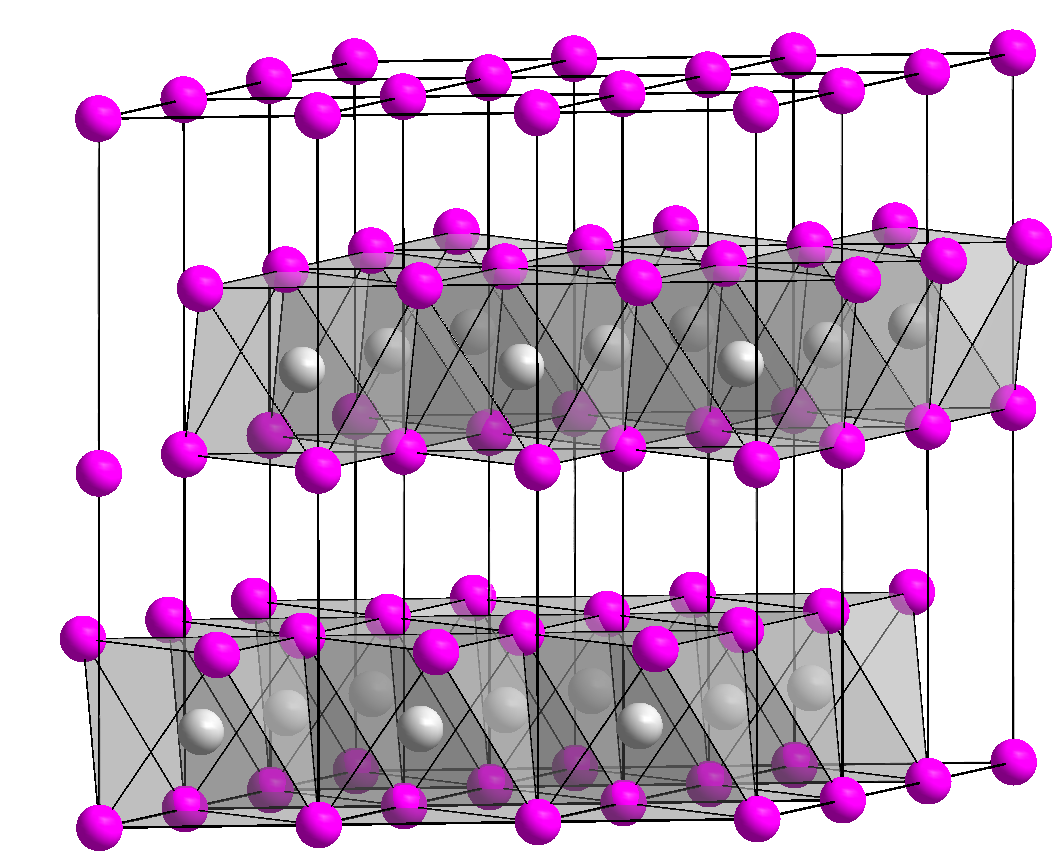
Crystal structure of copper(II) bromide

In the solid state CuBr_{2} has a polymeric structure, with CuBr_{4} planar units connected on opposite sides to form chains. The crystal structure is monoclinic, space group C2/m, with lattice constants a = 714 pm, b = 346 pm, c = 718 pm, e ß = 121° 15'. CuBr_{2} monomeric units are present in the gas phase at high temperature.

The tetrahydrate, structurally formulated as [CuBr_{2}(H_{2}O)_{2}]·2H_{2}O, has a monoclinic crystal structure and consists of distorted square planar trans-[CuBr_{2}(H_{2}O)_{2}] centres as well as two molecules of water.

== Synthesis ==
Copper(II) bromide can be obtained by combining copper(II) oxide and hydrobromic acid:

CuO + 2HBr → CuBr_{2} + H_{2}O.

The tetrahydrate can be produced by recrystallization of solutions of copper(II) bromide at 0 °C. If heated above 18 °C, it releases water to produce the anhydrous form.

=== Purification ===
Copper(II) bromide is purified by crystallization twice from water, filtration to remove any CuBr and concentration under vacuum. This product is dehydrated using phosphorus pentoxide.

== Usage ==
Copper(II) bromide lasers produce pulsed yellow and green light and have been studied as a possible treatment for cutaneous lesions. Experiments have also shown copper bromide treatment to be beneficial for skin rejuvenation. It has been widely used in photography as its solution was used as the bleaching step for intensifying collodion and gelatin negatives. Copper(II) bromide has also been proposed as a possible material in humidity indicator cards.

== Reactions ==
Copper(II) bromide in chloroform-ethyl acetate reacts with ketones resulting in the formation of alpha-bromo ketones. The resulting product can be directly used for the preparation of derivatives. This heterogeneous method is reported to be the most selective and direct method of formation of α-bromo ketones.

A CuBr_{2}/LiBr reagent combination can be used in the dibromination of n-pentenyl glycosides (NPGs). This allows for an NPG to serve as a glycosyl acceptor during halonium-promoted couplings. Such reactions give high yields of the dibromides from alkenyl sugars that are resistant to a direct reaction with molecular bromine.
