= Trimethylsilylacetylene =

Names
- Preferred IUPAC name Ethynyltri(methyl)silane

Identifiers
CAS Number	1066-54-2
3D model (JSmol)	Interactive image
Abbreviations	TMSA
ChemSpider	59499
ECHA InfoCard	100.012.655
EC Number	213-919-9
PubChem CID	66111
UNII	J82T3C3BGV
CompTox Dashboard (EPA)	DTXSID7061435
- InChI: InChI=1S/C5H10Si/c1-5-6(2,3)4/h1H,2-4H3 Key: CWMFRHBXRUITQE-UHFFFAOYSA-N; InChI=1S/C5H10Si/c1-5-6(2,3)4/h1H,2-4H3; InChI=1S/C5H10Si/c1-5-6(2,3)4/h1H,2-4H3 Key: CWMFRHBXRUITQE-UHFFFAOYSA-N
- SMILES: C#C[Si](C)(C)C

Properties
Chemical formula	(CH_{3})_{3}Si−C≡CH
Molar mass	98.220 g·mol^{−1}
Appearance	colorless liquid
Density	0.709 g/mL
Boiling point	53 °C (127 °F; 326 K)

Hazards
- GHS labelling
Pictograms	(GHS02: Flammable) (GHS05: Corrosive) (GHS07: Exclamation mark)
Signal word	Danger
Hazard statements	H225, H315, H318, H319, H335
Precautionary statements	P210, P233, P240, P241, P242, P243, P261, P264, P271, P280, P302+P352, P303+P361+P353, P304+P340, P305+P351+P338, P310, P312, P321, P332+P313, P337+P313, P362, P370+P378, P403+P233, P403+P235, P405, P501
Safety data sheet (SDS)	External MSDS
- Except where otherwise noted, data are given for materials in their standard state (at 25 °C [77 °F], 100 kPa). verify (what is ?) Infobox references

Trimethylsilylacetylene is the organosilicon compound with the formula (CH_{3})_{3}Si−C≡CH. A colorless liquid, "tms acetylene", as it is also called, is used as a source of ^{−}C≡CH anion in organic synthesis.

== Use ==
Trimethylsilylacetylene is used in Sonogashira couplings as the equivalent of acetylene. Using this protected alkyne, as opposed to acetylene itself, prevents further coupling reactions. The trimethylsilyl group can then be cleaved off with TBAF or DBU to form phenylacetylene derivatives. Trimethylsilylacetylene is also used to synthesize diphenylacetylene derivatives in a one-pot Sonogashira coupling, in which the phenylacetylene derivative reacts with a second aryl halide after in-situ deprotection. A less expensive alternative reagent is 2-methylbut-3-yn-2-ol, which after alkynylation is deprotected with base.

Trimethylsilylacetylene is commercially available. It may also be prepared in a manner similar to other silyl compounds: deprotonation of acetylene with a Grignard reagent, followed by reaction with trimethylsilyl chloride.

Trimethylsilylacetylene is a precursor to 1,4-bis(trimethylsilyl)buta-1,3-diyne, a protected form of 1,3-butadiyne.

== History ==
Trimethylsilylacetylene was first synthesized in 1959 by Heinz Günter Viehe. He reduced chloro(trimethylsilyl)acetylene by reaction with phenyllithium in diethyl ether and proceeded with subsequent hydrolysis.
