= Vinylacetylene =

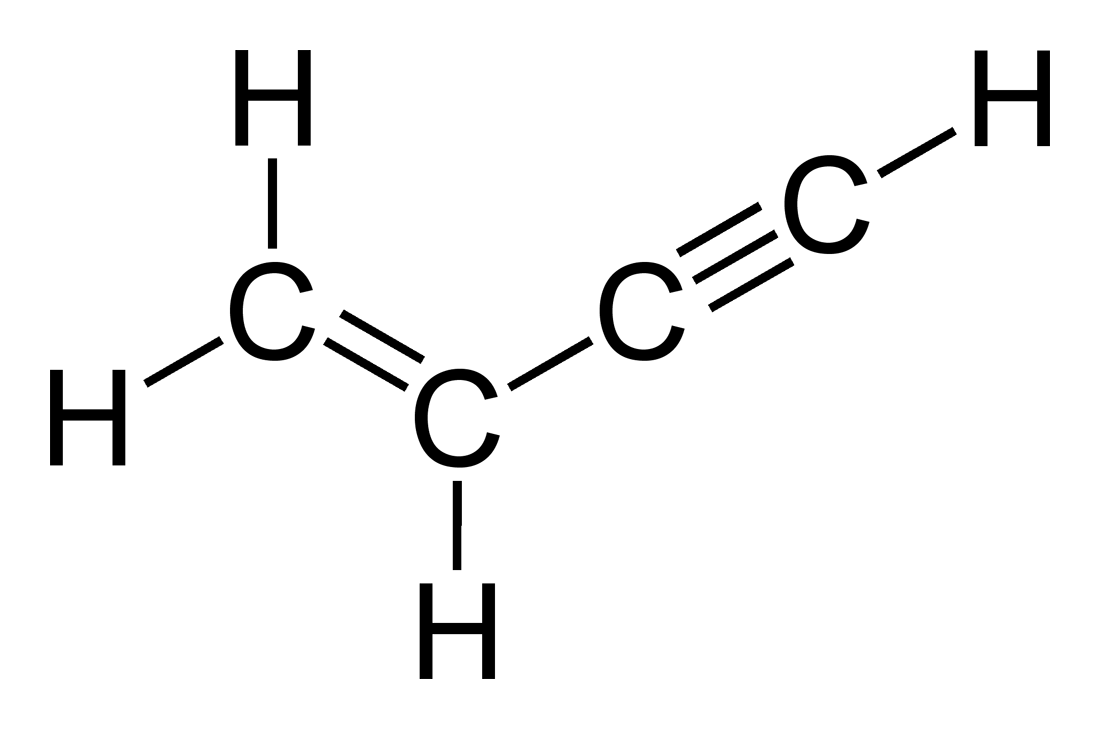

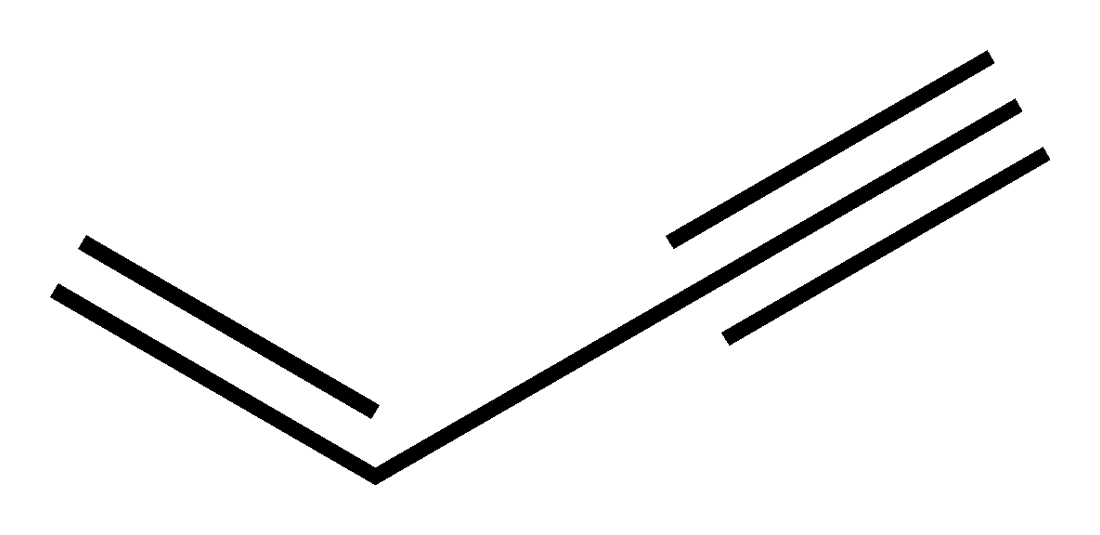

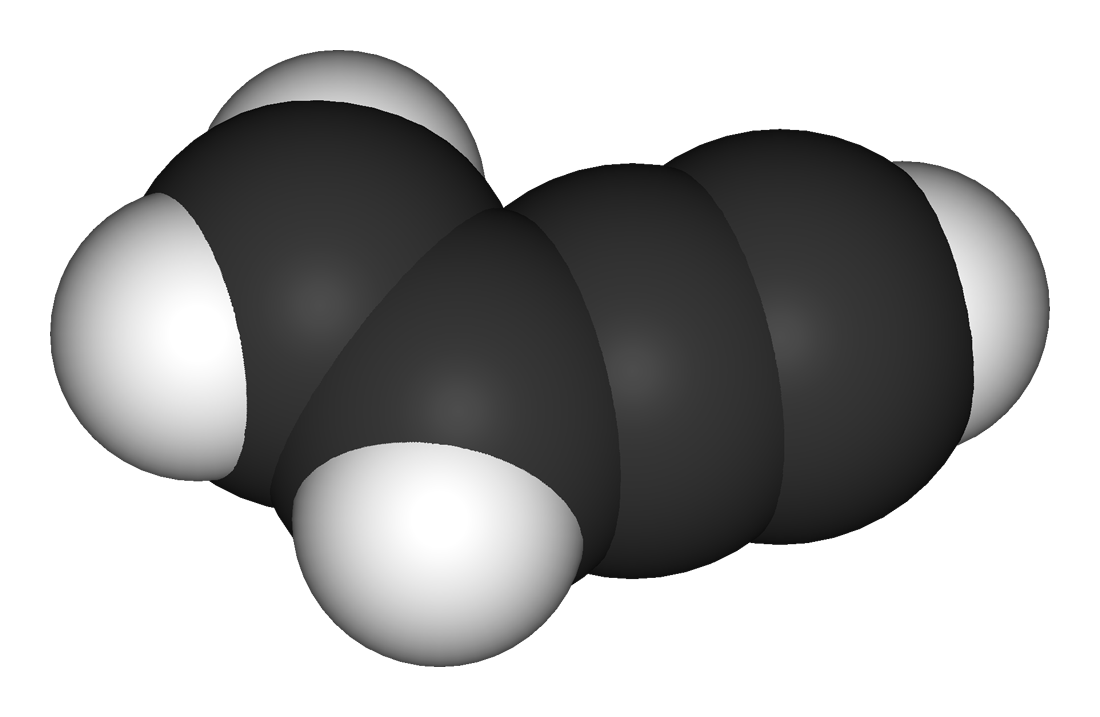

Names
- Preferred IUPAC name But-1-en-3-yne
- Other names: Butenyne, normal isomer; 3-Butene-1-yne; Vinyl acetylene

Identifiers
CAS Number	689-97-4
3D model (JSmol)	Interactive image
ChEBI	CHEBI:48088
ChemSpider	12197
ECHA InfoCard	100.010.650
PubChem CID	12720
UNII	VW72FM10OQ
CompTox Dashboard (EPA)	DTXSID4029199
- InChI: InChI=1S/C4H4/c1-3-4-2/h1,4H,2H2 Key: WFYPICNXBKQZGB-UHFFFAOYSA-N; InChI=1/C4H4/c1-3-4-2/h1,4H,2H2 Key: WFYPICNXBKQZGB-UHFFFAOYAE
- SMILES: C#CC=C

Properties
Chemical formula	H_{2}C=CH−C≡CH
Molar mass	52.07456 g/mol
Appearance	colourless gas
Boiling point	0 to 6 °C (32 to 43 °F; 273 to 279 K)
Solubility in water	low

Hazards
- Occupational safety and health (OHS/OSH)
Main hazards	Very flammable. Extremely dangerous because it can explode, even without air.
NFPA 704 (fire diamond)	2 4 3 W
Flash point	< −5 °C (23 °F; 268 K)
- Except where otherwise noted, data are given for materials in their standard state (at 25 °C [77 °F], 100 kPa). verify (what is ?) Infobox references

Vinylacetylene is the organic compound with the formula C_{4}H_{4} or H_{2}C=CH−C≡CH. The colourless gas was once used in the polymer industry. It is composed of both alkyne and alkene groups and is the simplest enyne.

== Safety ==
Vinylacetylene is extremely dangerous because in high enough concentrations (typically > 30 mole percent, but pressure dependent) it can auto-detonate (explode without air being present) especially at elevated pressures, such as those seen in chemical plants processing C4 hydrocarbons (hydrocarbons with 4 carbon atoms). An example of such an explosion occurred at a Union Carbide plant in Texas City in 1969.

== Synthesis ==
Vinylacetylene was first synthesized by Hofmann elimination of the related quaternary ammonium salt:

[(CH_{3})_{3}N^{+}−CH_{2}−CH=CH−CH_{2}−N^{+}(CH_{3})_{3}](I^{−})_{2} → 2 [(CH_{3})_{3}NH]^{+}I^{−} + H_{2}C=CH−C≡CH

It is usually synthesized by dehydrohalogenation of 1,3-dichloro-2-butene Cl−CH_{2}−CH=CCl−CH_{3}.

It also arises via the dimerization of acetylene, which is catalyzed by copper(I) chloride.

Dehydrogenation of 1,3-butadiene is yet another route.

== Application ==
At one time, chloroprene (2-chloro-1,3-butadiene), an industrially important monomer, was produced via the intermediacy of vinyl acetylene. In this process, acetylene is dimerized to give vinyl acetylene, which is then combined with hydrogen chloride to give 4-chloro-1,2-butadiene via 1,4-addition. This allene derivative then, in the presence of cuprous chloride, rearranges to 2-chloro-1,3-butadiene:

H_{2}C=CH−C≡CH + HCl → H_{2}ClC−CH=C=CH_{2}
H_{2}ClC−CH=C=CH_{2} → H_{2}C=CH−CCl=CH_{2}
