= Silver acetylide =

- Wireframe model of silver acetylide

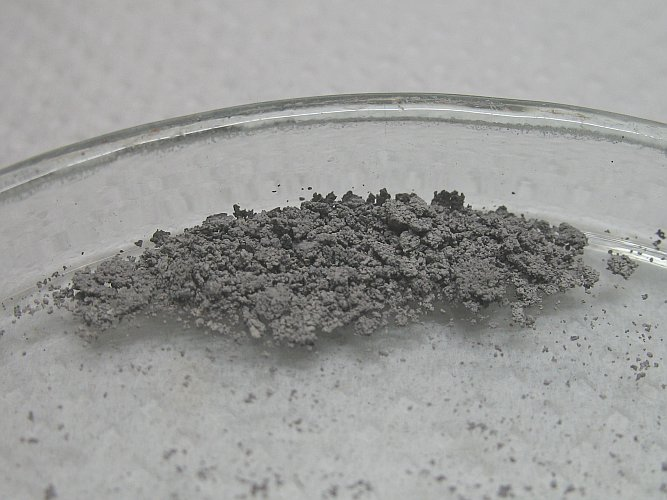

Names
- Preferred IUPAC name Silver acetylide
- Systematic IUPAC name Silver(I) ethynediide
- Other names: Silver percarbide; Silver carbide; Silver dicarbide; Argentous acetylide; Argentous ethynediide; Argentous percarbide; Argentous carbide; Argentous dicarbide

Identifiers
CAS Number	7659-31-6; ethynide: 13092-75-6
3D model (JSmol)	Interactive image; ethynide: Interactive image
ChemSpider	25934157; ethynide: 55489
PubChem CID	ethynide: 25150847
CompTox Dashboard (EPA)	DTXSID30904769
- InChI: InChI=1S/C2.2Ag/c1-2;;/q-2;2*+1 Key: FIDGMLJJLFFOEI-UHFFFAOYSA-N; ethynide: InChI=1S/C2H.Ag/c1-2;/h1H;/q-1;+1 Key: SLERPCVQDVNSAK-UHFFFAOYSA-N
- SMILES: [Ag+].[Ag+].[C-]#[C-]; ethynide: [Ag+].[C-]#C

Properties
Chemical formula	Ag_{2}C_{2}
Molar mass	239.758 g·mol^{−1}
Appearance	gray or white solid
Density	4.47 g/cm^{3}
Melting point	120 °C (248 °F; 393 K)
Boiling point	decomposes
Solubility in water	insoluble

Hazards
- Occupational safety and health (OHS/OSH)
Main hazards	highly sensitive primary explosive
NFPA 704 (fire diamond)	3 3 4
Flash point	77 °C (171 °F; 350 K)

Thermochemistry
Std enthalpy of formation (Δ_{f}H^{⦵}_{298})	357.6±5.0 kJ/mol
- Except where otherwise noted, data are given for materials in their standard state (at 25 °C [77 °F], 100 kPa). verify (what is ?) Infobox references

Silver acetylide is an inorganic chemical compound with the formula Ag_{2}C_{2}, a metal acetylide. The compound can be regarded as a silver salt of the weak acid, acetylene. The salt's anion consists of two carbon atoms linked by a triple bond, thus, its structure is [Ag^{+}]_{2}[^{−}C≡C^{−}]. The alternate name "silver carbide" is rarely used, although the analogous calcium compound CaC_{2} is called calcium carbide. Silver acetylide is a primary explosive.

== Synthesis ==
Silver acetylide can be produced by passing acetylene gas through a solution of silver nitrate:

2 AgNO_{3}(aq) + C_{2}H_{2}(g) → Ag_{2}C_{2}(s) + 2 HNO_{3}(aq)

The reaction product is a greyish to white precipitate. This is the same synthesis from Berthelot in which he first found silver acetylide in 1866.

The double salt is formed in acidic or neutral silver nitrate solutions. Performing the synthesis in basic ammonia solution does not allow the double salt to form, producing pure silver acetylide. To properly form the double salt, acetylene gas is passed through dilute silver nitrate and nitric acid solution. Instead of the conventional synthesis of passing acetylene gas through silver nitrate solution, a purer and whiter precipitate can be formed by passing acetylene gas through acetone and adding the acetylene solution drop-wise to a dilute silver nitrate and nitric acid solution. The reaction was performed at ambient room temperature.

Silver acetylide can be formed on the surface of silver or high-silver alloys, e.g. in pipes used for transport of acetylene, if silver brazing was used in their joints.

== Explosive character ==
Pure silver acetylide is a heat- and shock-sensitive primary explosive. Silver acetylide decomposes through the reaction:

Ag_{2}C_{2}(s) → 2 Ag(s) + 2 C(s)

The detonation velocity of the silver acetylide-silver nitrate double salt is 1980 m/s, while that of pure silver acetylide is 1200 m/s.

== Solubility ==
Silver acetylide is not soluble in water and is not appreciably soluble in any other pure solvent. However, it is soluble in concentrated solutions of certain silver salts including AgBF4 and AgCF3CO2.
