= Phenylacetylene =

- Phenylacetylene

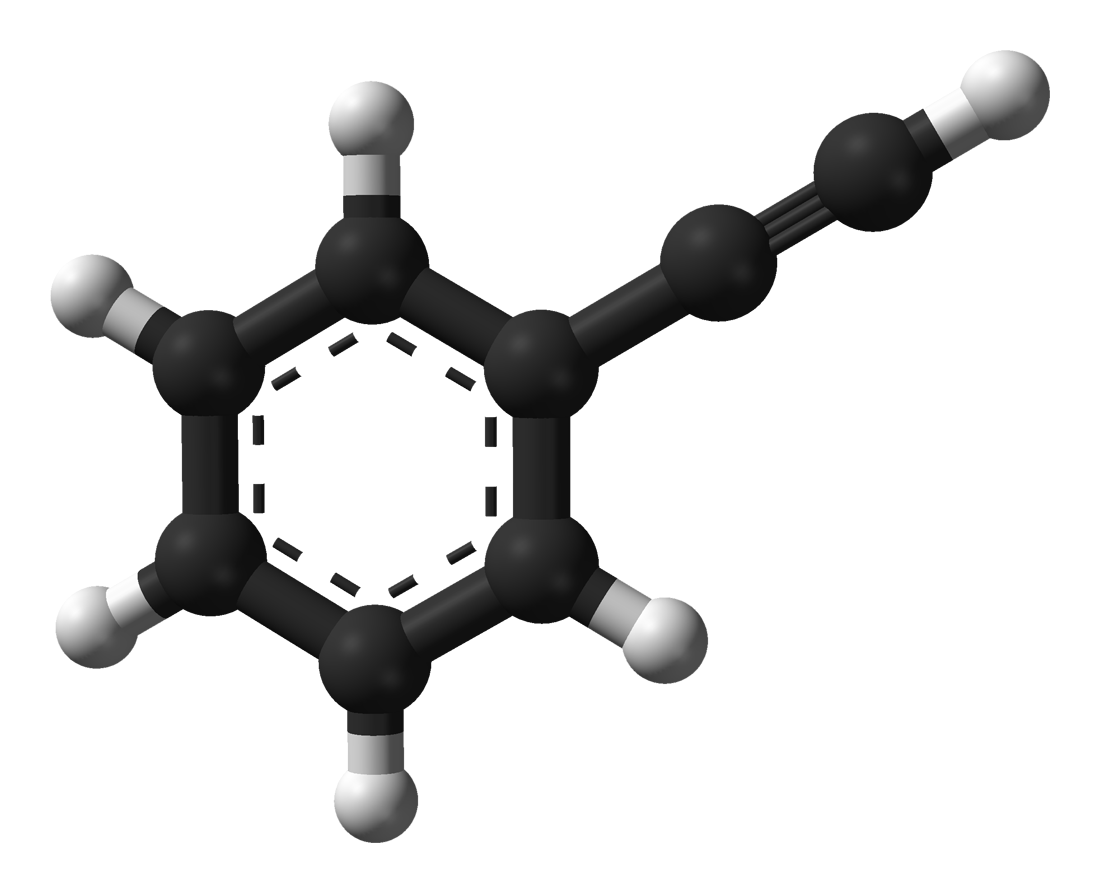

Names
- Preferred IUPAC name Ethynylbenzene
- Other names Phenylacetylene

Identifiers
CAS Number	536-74-3
3D model (JSmol)	Interactive image
ChEMBL	ChEMBL234833
ChemSpider	10364
ECHA InfoCard	100.007.861
PubChem CID	10821
UNII	239WSR2IBO
CompTox Dashboard (EPA)	DTXSID1060211
- InChI: InChI=1S/C8H6/c1-2-8-6-4-3-5-7-8/h1,3-7H Key: UEXCJVNBTNXOEH-UHFFFAOYSA-N; InChI=1/C8H6/c1-2-8-6-4-3-5-7-8/h1,3-7H Key: UEXCJVNBTNXOEH-UHFFFAOYAC
- SMILES: C#Cc1ccccc1

Properties
Chemical formula	C_{8}H_{6}
Molar mass	102.133 g/mol
Density	0.93 g/cm^{3}
Melting point	−45 °C (−49 °F; 228 K)
Boiling point	142 to 144 °C (288 to 291 °F; 415 to 417 K)
Acidity (pK_{a})	28.7 (DMSO), 23.2 (aq, extrapolated)
Magnetic susceptibility (χ)	−72.01·10^{−6} cm^{3}/mol
- Except where otherwise noted, data are given for materials in their standard state (at 25 °C [77 °F], 100 kPa). verify (what is ?) Infobox references

Phenylacetylene is an alkyne hydrocarbon containing a phenyl group. It exists as a colorless, viscous liquid. In research, it is sometimes used as an analog for acetylene; being a liquid, it is easier to handle than acetylene gas.

== Preparation ==
In the laboratory, phenylacetylene can be prepared by elimination of hydrogen bromide from styrene dibromide using sodium amide in ammonia:

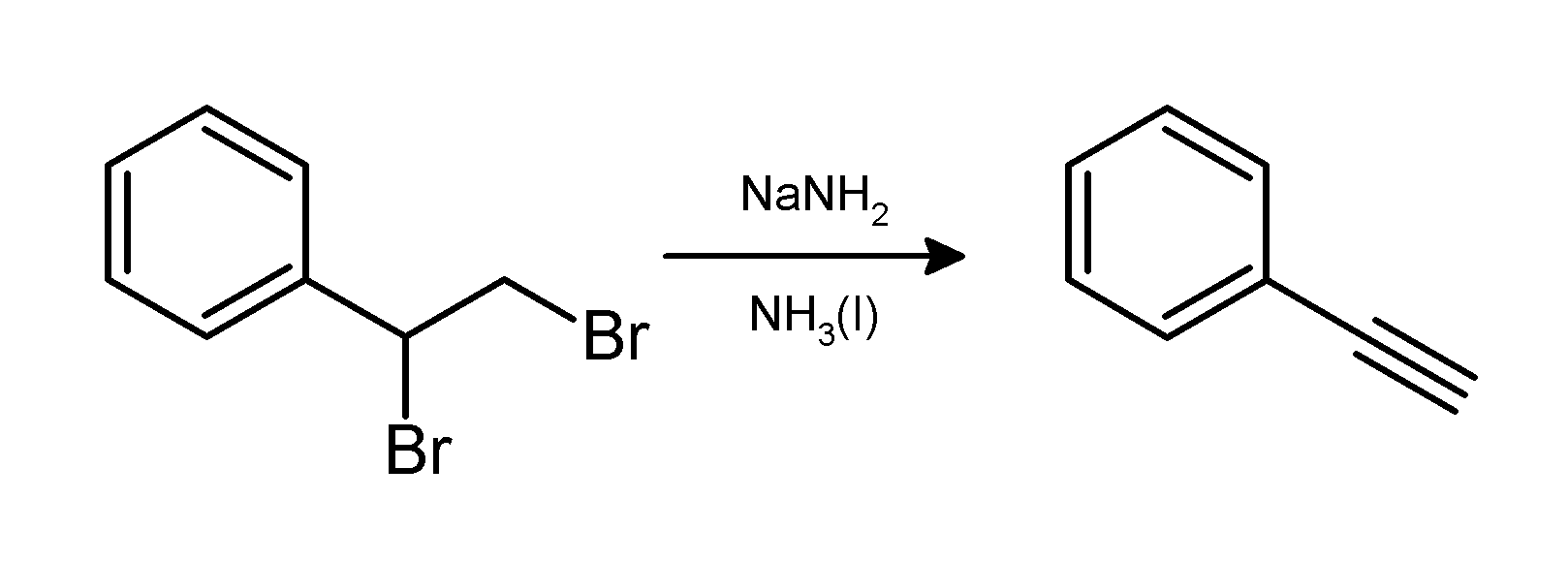

It can also be prepared by the elimination of hydrogen bromide from bromostyrene using molten potassium hydroxide. Yet another method involves the Sonogashira coupling of iodobenzene with trimethylsilylacetylene, followed by removal of the trimethylsilyl group using TBAF.

== Reactions ==
Phenylacetylene is a prototypical terminal acetylene, undergoing many reactions expected of that functional group. It undergoes semihydrogenation over Lindlar catalyst to give styrene. In the presence of base and copper(II) salts, it undergoes oxidative coupling to give diphenylbutadiyne. In the presence of metal catalysts, it undergoes oligomerization, trimerization, and even polymerization.

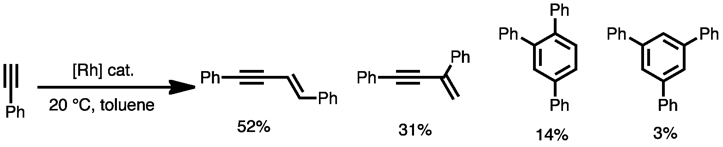

In the presence of gold or mercury reagents, phenylacetylene hydrates to give acetophenone:

PhC_{2}H + H_{2}O → PhC(O)CH_{3}

== See also ==
- Alkyne
- Alkyne trimerisation
