= Monosodium acetylide =

Names
- IUPAC name Ethynylsodium
- Other names: Sodium hydrogen acetylide; Sodium hydrogen ethynide

Identifiers
CAS Number	1066-26-8
3D model (JSmol)	Interactive image
ChEBI	CHEBI:55387
ChemSpider	92108
ECHA InfoCard	100.012.645
EC Number	213-908-9
Gmelin Reference	174471
PubChem CID	2733336
CompTox Dashboard (EPA)	DTXSID50910044
- InChI: InChI=1S/C2H.Na/c1-2;/h1H;/q-1;+1 Key: SFDZETWZUCDYMD-UHFFFAOYSA-N
- SMILES: C#[C-].[Na+]

Properties
Chemical formula	C_{2}HNa
Molar mass	48.020 g·mol^{−1}
Appearance	white solid
Density	1.352 g/cm^{3}
Solubility in water	hydrolyzes

Hazards
- GHS labelling
Pictograms	(GHS02: Flammable) (GHS05: Corrosive)
Signal word	Danger
Hazard statements	H261, H314
Precautionary statements	P231+P232, P260, P264, P280, P301+P330+P331, P302+P361+P354, P304+P340, P305+P354+P338, P316, P321, P363, P370+P378, P402+P404, P405, P501
- Except where otherwise noted, data are given for materials in their standard state (at 25 °C [77 °F], 100 kPa). Infobox references

Monosodium acetylide, also known as sodium hydrogen acetylide, is an organosodium compound with the formula NaC≡CH. It is a sodium salt of acetylene, consisting of sodium cations (Na^{+}) and hydrogen acetylide anions (^{−}C≡CH). It is derived from acetylene by deprotonation using a sodium base, typically sodium amide.

HC≡CH + NaNH_{2} → NaC≡CH + NH_{3}

This compound, a white solid, has been characterized by neutron diffraction, which revealed a C≡C bond of 127 pm, which is longer than the C≡C bond length in acetylene itself (120.4 pm). The negative formal charge is essentially localized on one of the carbon atoms. Millimeter spectroscopy yielded Na−C and C≡C bond lengths of 222.1 pm and 121.7 pm, respectively. The C−H bond length is assumed to be 106 pm.

Monosodium acetylide can be used as a strong nucleophile in organic synthesis. However, it has largely been displaced in this application by monolithium acetylide, which can be prepared more easily.

Monosodium acetylide hydrolizes in contact with water, producing sodium hydroxide and acetylene.

NaC≡CH + H_{2}O → HC≡CH + NaOH

Monosodium acetylide is used in the Nef synthesis.

Monosodium acetylide is theorized to exist in the outer envelopes of carbon stars such as IRC +10216, where it could be formed by the reaction between sodium or sodium cations and ethynyl radicals or acetylene cations (HCCH^{+}), the latter two produced by photodissociation.
