= Copper(I) acetylide =

Names
- IUPAC name Dicuprous acetylide
- Other names: Copper(I) acetylide; Copper carbide; Cuprous acetylide

Identifiers
CAS Number	1117-94-8
3D model (JSmol)	Interactive image
ChemSpider	14318114
PubChem CID	19021056
- InChI: InChI=1S/C2.2Cu/c1-2;;/q-2;2*+1 Key: SQDLRJMJSRRYGA-UHFFFAOYSA-N; InChI=1/C2.2Cu/c1-2;;/q-2;2*+1 Key: SQDLRJMJSRRYGA-UHFFFAOYAK
- SMILES: [C-]#[C-].[Cu+].[Cu+]

Properties
Chemical formula	Cu_{2}C_{2}
Molar mass	151.114 g·mol^{−1}
Appearance	red-brown powder

Hazards
- Occupational safety and health (OHS/OSH)
Main hazards	explosive
- NIOSH (US health exposure limits)
PEL (Permissible)	TWA 1 mg/m^{3} (as Cu)
REL (Recommended)	TWA 1 mg/m^{3} (as Cu)
IDLH (Immediate danger)	TWA 100 mg/m^{3} (as Cu)
- Except where otherwise noted, data are given for materials in their standard state (at 25 °C [77 °F], 100 kPa). verify (what is ?) Infobox references

Copper(I) acetylide, copper carbide or cuprous acetylide, is claimed to be a chemical compound with the formula Cu_{2}C_{2}. It is proposed to consists of Cu^{+} cations and acetylide anions ^{−}C≡C^{−}, with the triple bond between the two carbon atoms. Although never characterized by X-ray crystallography, the material has been claimed at least since 1856. One form is claimed to be a monohydrate with formula Cu_{2}C_{2}·H_{2}O. It is a reddish-brown explosive powder.

== Synthesis ==
Materials purported to be copper acetylide can be prepared by treating acetylene with a solution of copper(I) chloride and ammonia:

C_{2}H_{2}(g) + 2 CuCl(s) → Cu_{2}C_{2}(s) + 2 HCl(g)

This reaction produces a reddish solid precipitate.

== Properties ==
When dry, "copper acetylide" is a heat and shock sensitive primary explosive, more sensitive than silver acetylide.

In acetylene manufacturing plants, copper acetylide is thought to form inside pipes made of copper or an alloy with high copper content, which may result in violent explosion. This led to abandonment of copper as a construction material in such facilities. Copper catalysts used in the chemical industry can also possess a degree of risk under certain conditions.

== Reactions ==
"Copper(I) acetylide" is claimed to be a precursor to polyynes. Treatment of Cu_{2}C_{2}·H_{2}O with ammonia in air leaves a black solid residue, claimed to be carbyne, an elusive allotrope of carbon:

Cu^{+}(^{−}C(≡C−C≡)_{n}C^{−})Cu^{+}

This interpretation has been disputed.

Freshly prepared "copper(I) acetylide" reacts with hydrochloric acid to form acetylene and copper(I) chloride. Samples that have been aged with exposure to air or to copper(II) ions liberate also higher polyynes H(−C≡C−)_{n}H, with n from 2 to 6, when decomposed by hydrochloric acid. A "carbonaceous" residue of this decomposition also has the spectral signature of (−C≡C−)_{n} chains. It has been conjectured that oxidation causes polymerization of the acetylide anions C^{2−}_{2} in the solid into carbyne-type anions. ^{−}C(≡C−C≡)_{n}C^{−} or cumulene-type anions ^{2−}C(=C=C=)_{n}C^{2−}.

Thermal decomposition of "copper(I) acetylide" in vacuum is not explosive and leaves copper as a fine powder at the bottom of the flask, while depositing a fluffy very fine carbon powder on the walls. On the basis of spectral data, this powder was claimed to be carbyne (−C≡C−)_{n} rather than graphite as expected.

== Applications ==
Though not practically useful as an explosive due to high sensitivity, it is interesting as a curiosity because it is one of the very few explosives that do not liberate any gaseous products upon detonation.

The formation of copper(I) acetylide when a gas is passed through a solution of copper(I) chloride is used as a test for the presence of acetylene.

Reactions between Cu^{+} and alkynes occur only if a terminal hydrogen is present (as it is slightly acidic in nature). Thus, this reaction is used for identification of terminal alkynes.

== Related compounds ==
Although Cu_{2}C_{2} remains weakly characterized, complexes with a Cu−C≡C−Cu linkage are known.

== See also ==
- Carbide
- Walter Reppe
- Ethynylation
