= Copper(I) chloride =

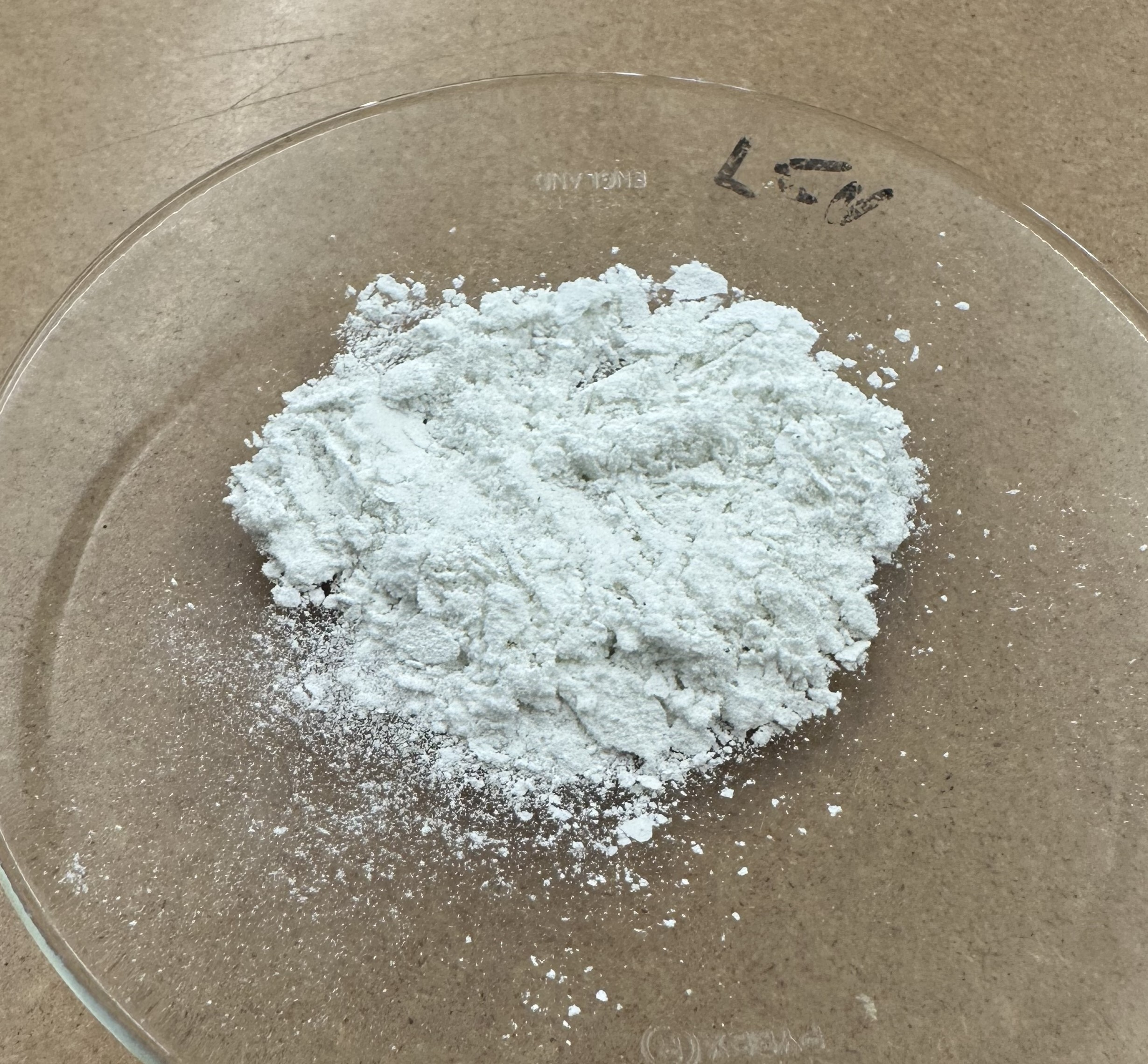
- Sample of copper(I) chloride

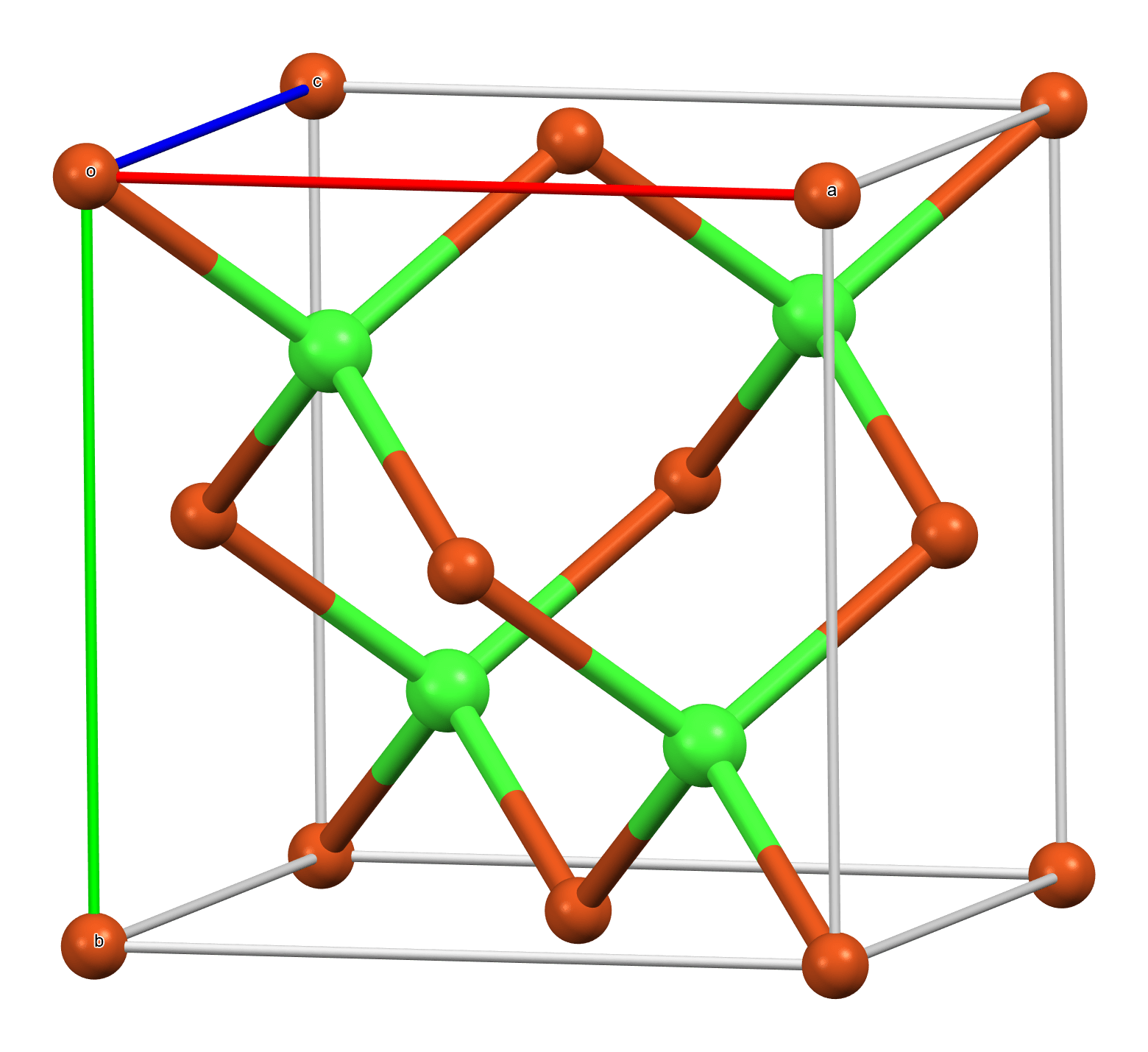
- Unit cell of nantokite

Names
- IUPAC name Copper(I) chloride
- Other names Cuprous chloride

Identifiers
| CAS Number | 7758-89-6 |
| 3D model (JSmol) | Interactive image |
| Beilstein Reference | 8127933 |
| ChEBI | CHEBI:53472 |
| ChemSpider | 56403 |
| DrugBank | DB15535 |
| ECHA InfoCard | 100.028.948 |
| EC Number | 231-842-9 |
| Gmelin Reference | 13676 |
| PubChem CID | 62652 |
| RTECS number | GL6990000 |
| UNII | C955P95064 |
| UN number | 2802 |
| CompTox Dashboard (EPA) | DTXSID5035242 |
- InChI: InChI=1S/ClH.Cu/h1H;/q;+1/p-1 Key: OXBLHERUFWYNTN-UHFFFAOYSA-M; InChI=1/ClH.Cu/h1H;/q;+1/p-1 Key: OXBLHERUFWYNTN-REWHXWOFAC
- SMILES: Cl[Cu]

Properties
| Chemical formula | CuCl |
| Molar mass | 99.00 g·mol^{−1} |
| Appearance | white powder, slightly green from oxidized impurities |
| Density | 4.14 g/cm^{3}; 3.69 g/cm^{3} (molten, 423 °C (793 °F)) |
| Melting point | 423 °C (793 °F; 696 K) |
| Boiling point | 1,490 °C (2,710 °F; 1,760 K) |
| Solubility in water | 0.0047 g/100 mL (20 °C (68 °F)) |
| Solubility product (K_{sp}) | 1.72×10^{−7} |
| Vapor pressure | 10 Pa (0.0015 psi) (459 °C (858 °F)) |
| Band gap | 0.56 eV (300 K (27 °C; 80 °F), direct) |
| Magnetic susceptibility (χ) | −40×10^{−6} cm^{3}/mol |
| Refractive index (n_{D}) | 1.930 |

Structure
| Crystal structure | Cubic, cF20 |
| Space group | F4̅3m, No. 216 |
| Point group | 3m |
| Lattice constant | a = 3.81 Å, b = 3.81 Å, c = 9.16 Å α = 90°, β = 90°, γ = 120° |
| Lattice volume (V) | 115.23 Å^{3} |
| Formula units (Z) | 3 |

Thermochemistry
| Heat capacity (C) | 48.5 J⋅mol^{−1}·K^{-1} |
| Std molar entropy (S^{⦵}_{298}) | 86.2 J⋅mol^{−1}·K^{-1} |
| Std enthalpy of formation (Δ_{f}H^{⦵}_{298}) | −137.2 kJ⋅mol^{−1} |
| Gibbs free energy (Δ_{f}G^{⦵}) | −119.9 kJ⋅mol^{−1} |
| Enthalpy of fusion (Δ_{f}H^{⦵}_{fus}) | 7.08 kJ⋅mol^{−1} |

Hazards
- GHS labelling
| Pictograms | (GHS05: Corrosive) (GHS07: Exclamation mark) (GHS09: Environmental hazard) |
| Signal word | Danger |
| Hazard statements | H302+H312, H315, H318, H410 |
| Precautionary statements | P264, P270, P273, P280, P301+P312+P330, P302+P352+P312, P305+P351+P338+P310, P332+P313, P362, P391, P501 |
| NFPA 704 (fire diamond) | 2 0 1 |
| Threshold limit value (TLV) | 1 mg/m^{3} (TWA) |
- Lethal dose or concentration (LD, LC)
| LD_{50} (median dose) | 336 mg/kg (rat, oral); 1224 mg/kg (rat, dermal) |
- NIOSH (US health exposure limits)
| PEL (Permissible) | TWA 1 mg/m^{3} (as Cu) |
| REL (Recommended) | TWA 1 mg/m^{3} (as Cu) |
| IDLH (Immediate danger) | TWA 100 mg/m^{3} (as Cu) |

Related compounds
| Other anions | Copper(I) fluoride; Copper(I) bromide; Copper(I) iodide |
| Other cations | Silver(I) chloride; Gold(I) chloride |
| Related compounds | Copper(II) chloride |
- Except where otherwise noted, data are given for materials in their standard state (at 25 °C [77 °F], 100 kPa). verify (what is ?) Infobox references

Copper(I) chloride, commonly called cuprous chloride, is the lower chloride of copper, with the formula CuCl. The substance is a white solid sparingly soluble in water, but very soluble in concentrated hydrochloric acid. Impure samples appear green due to the presence of copper(II) chloride (CuCl_{2}).

== Occurrence ==
CuCl occurs as the rare mineral nantokite.

== Structure ==
Copper(I) chloride has the cubic zincblende crystal structure at ambient conditions. Upon heating to 408 °C (766 °F) the structure changes to hexagonal. Several other crystalline forms of CuCl appear at high pressures (several GPa).

== Synthesis ==
Copper(I) chloride is produced industrially by the direct combination of copper metal and chlorine at 450–900 °C (842–1,652 °F):

2 Cu + Cl_{2} → 2 CuCl

Copper(I) chloride can also be prepared by reducing copper(II) chloride with sulfur dioxide, or with ascorbic acid (vitamin C) that acts as a reducing sugar:

2 CuCl_{2} + SO_{2} + 2 H_{2}O → 2 CuCl + H_{2}SO_{4} + 2 HCl
2 CuCl_{2} + C_{6}H_{8}O_{6} → 2CuCl + 2HCl + C_{6}H_{6}O_{6}

Many other reducing agents can be used.

== Uses ==
The main use of copper(I) chloride is as a precursor to the fungicide copper oxychloride (Cu_{2}(OH)_{3}Cl). For this purpose aqueous copper(I) chloride is generated by comproportionation and then air-oxidized:

Cu + CuCl_{2} → 2 CuCl
12 CuCl + 3 O_{2} + 6 H_{2}O → 4 Cu_{2}(OH)_{3}Cl + 4 CuCl_{2}

Copper(I) chloride catalyzes a variety of organic reactions, as discussed above. Its affinity for carbon monoxide in the presence of aluminium chloride is exploited in the COPure process.

=== In organic synthesis ===
CuCl is used as a co-catalyst with carbon monoxide, aluminium chloride, and hydrogen chloride in the Gatterman-Koch reaction to form benzaldehydes.

In the Sandmeyer reaction, the treatment of an arenediazonium salt with CuCl leads to an aryl chloride. For example:

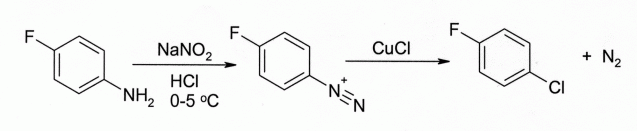

The reaction has wide scope and usually gives good yields.

Early investigators observed that copper(I) halides catalyse 1,4-addition of Grignard reagents to alpha,beta-unsaturated ketones led to the development of organocuprate reagents that are widely used today in organic synthesis:

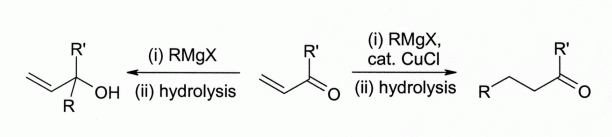

This finding led to the development of organocopper chemistry. For example, CuCl reacts with methyllithium (CH_{3}Li) to form Gilman reagents such as (CH_{3})_{2}CuLi, which find use in organic synthesis. Grignard reagents form similar organocopper compounds. Although other copper(I) compounds such as copper(I) iodide (CuI) are now more often used for these types of reactions, copper(I) chloride is still recommended in some cases:

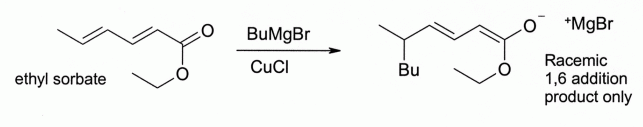

Cuprous chloride also catalyzes the dimerization of acetylene to vinylacetylene, once used as a precursor to various polymers such a neoprene.

=== Niche uses ===
CuCl is used as a catalyst in atom transfer radical polymerization (ATRP). It is also used in pyrotechnics as a blue/green coloring agent. In a flame test, copper chlorides, like all copper compounds, emit green-blue.

== Reactions ==
Upon contact with water, copper(I) chloride slowly undergoes disproportionation:

2 CuCl → Cu + CuCl_{2}

In part for this reason, samples in air assume a green coloration.

Copper(I) chloride is a Lewis acid. It is classified as soft according to the hard-soft acid-base concept. Thus, it forms a series of complexes with soft Lewis bases such as triphenylphosphine:

CuCl + 1 P(C_{6}H_{5})_{3} → 1/4 {CuCl[P(C_{6}H_{5})_{3}]}_{4}
CuCl + 2 P(C_{6}H_{5})_{3} → CuCl[P(C_{6}H_{5})_{3})]_{2}
CuCl + 3 P(C_{6}H_{5})_{3} → CuCl[P(C_{6}H_{5})_{3})]_{3}

CuCl also forms complexes with halides. For example the hydronium (H_{3}O^{+}) complex H_{3}O^{+}CuCl^{−}_{2} forms in concentrated hydrochloric acid. Chloride is displaced by cyanide (CN^{−}) and thiosulfate (S_{2}O^{2−}_{3}).

Solutions of CuCl in HCl absorb carbon monoxide to form colourless complexes such as the chloride-bridged dimer [CuCl(CO)]_{2}. The same hydrochloric acid solutions also react with acetylene gas to form [CuCl(C_{2}H_{2})]. Ammoniacal solutions of CuCl react with acetylenes to form the explosive copper(I) acetylide (Cu_{2}C_{2}). Alkene complexes of CuCl can be prepared by reduction of copper(II) chloride (CuCl_{2}) by sulfur dioxide in the presence of the alkene in alcohol solution. Complexes with dienes such as 1,5-cyclooctadiene are particularly stable:

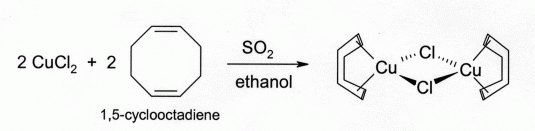

== History ==
Copper(I) chloride was first prepared by Robert Boyle and designated rosin of copper in the mid-seventeenth century from mercury(II) chloride ("Venetian sublimate") and copper metal:

HgCl_{2} + 2 Cu → 2 CuCl + Hg

In 1799, Joseph Proust first differentiated two different chlorides of copper. He prepared CuCl (which he called white muriate of copper) by heating CuCl_{2} at red heat in the absence of air, causing it to lose half of its combined chlorine followed by removing residual CuCl_{2} by washing with water.

An acidic solution of CuCl was formerly used to analyze carbon monoxide content in gases, for example in Hempel's gas apparatus where the CuCl absorbs the carbon monoxide. This application was significant during the nineteenth and early twentieth centuries when coal gas was widely used for heating and lighting.

== Gallery ==
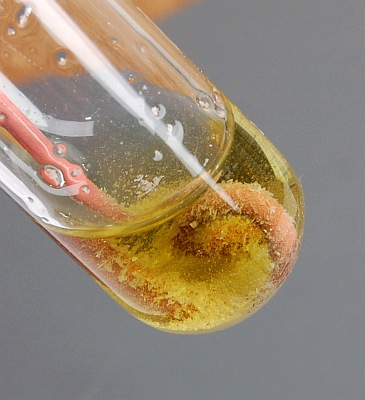
White copper(I) chloride crystals on copper wire

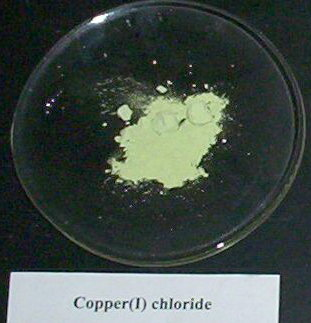
Copper(I) chloride partially oxidized in air

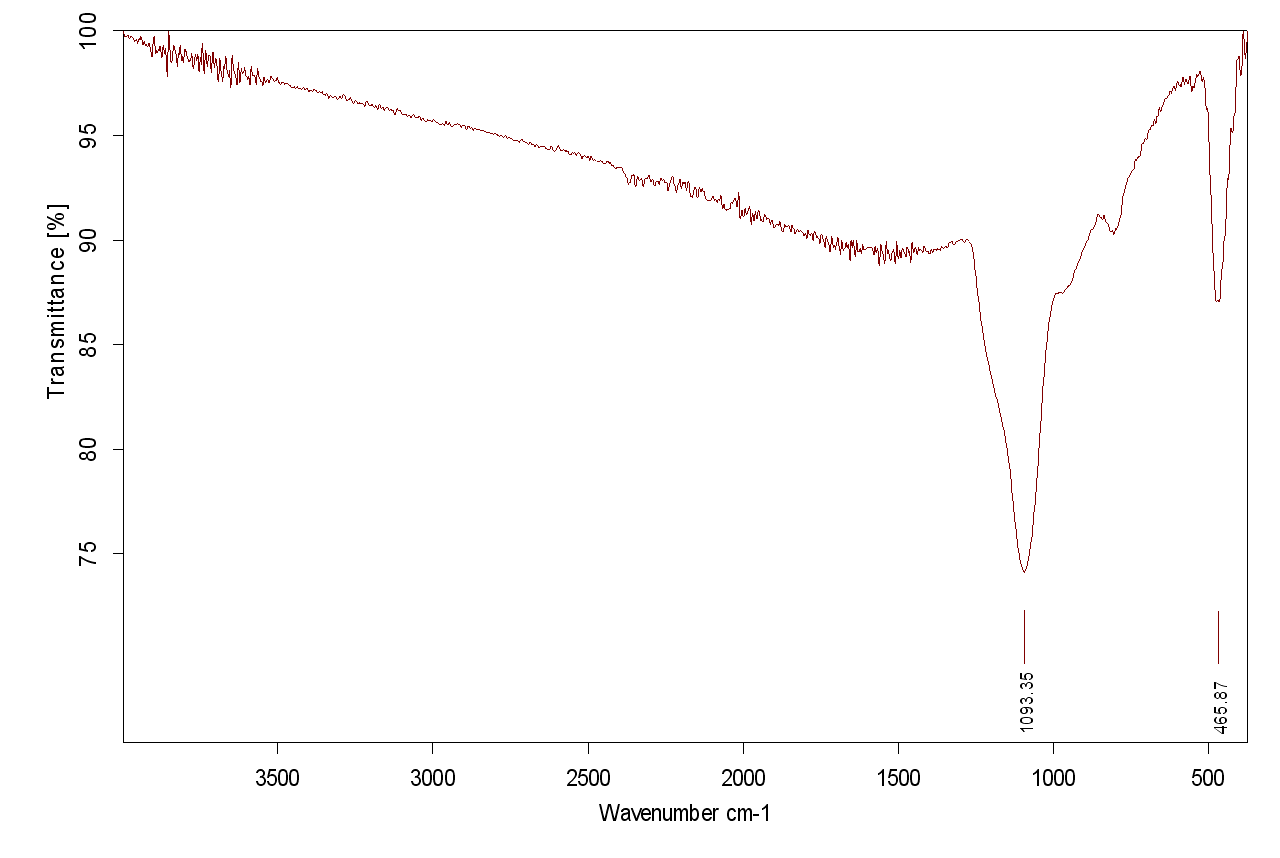
IR absorption spectrum of copper(I) chloride
