= Copper(I) bromide =

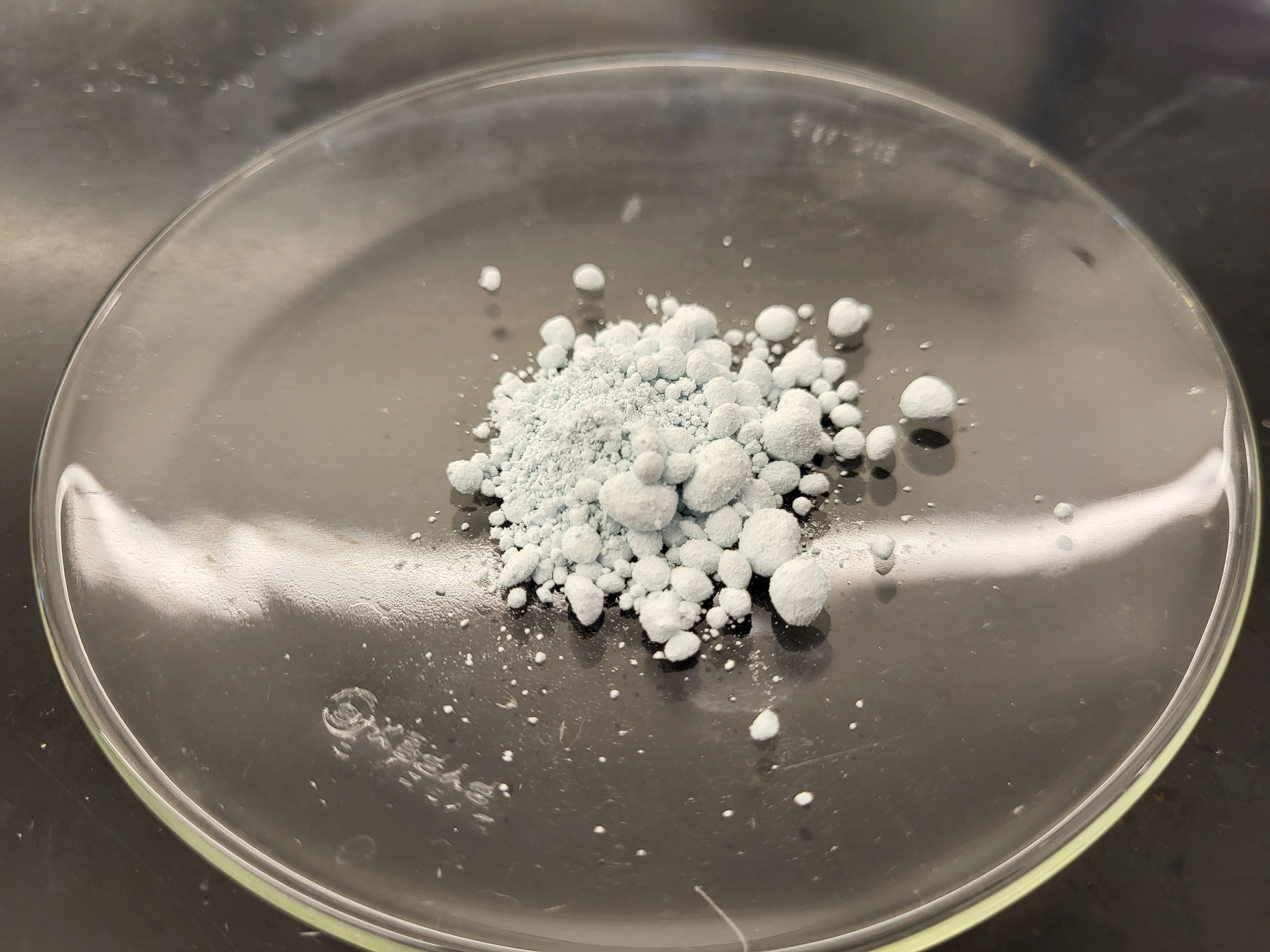
- Sample of copper(I) bromide

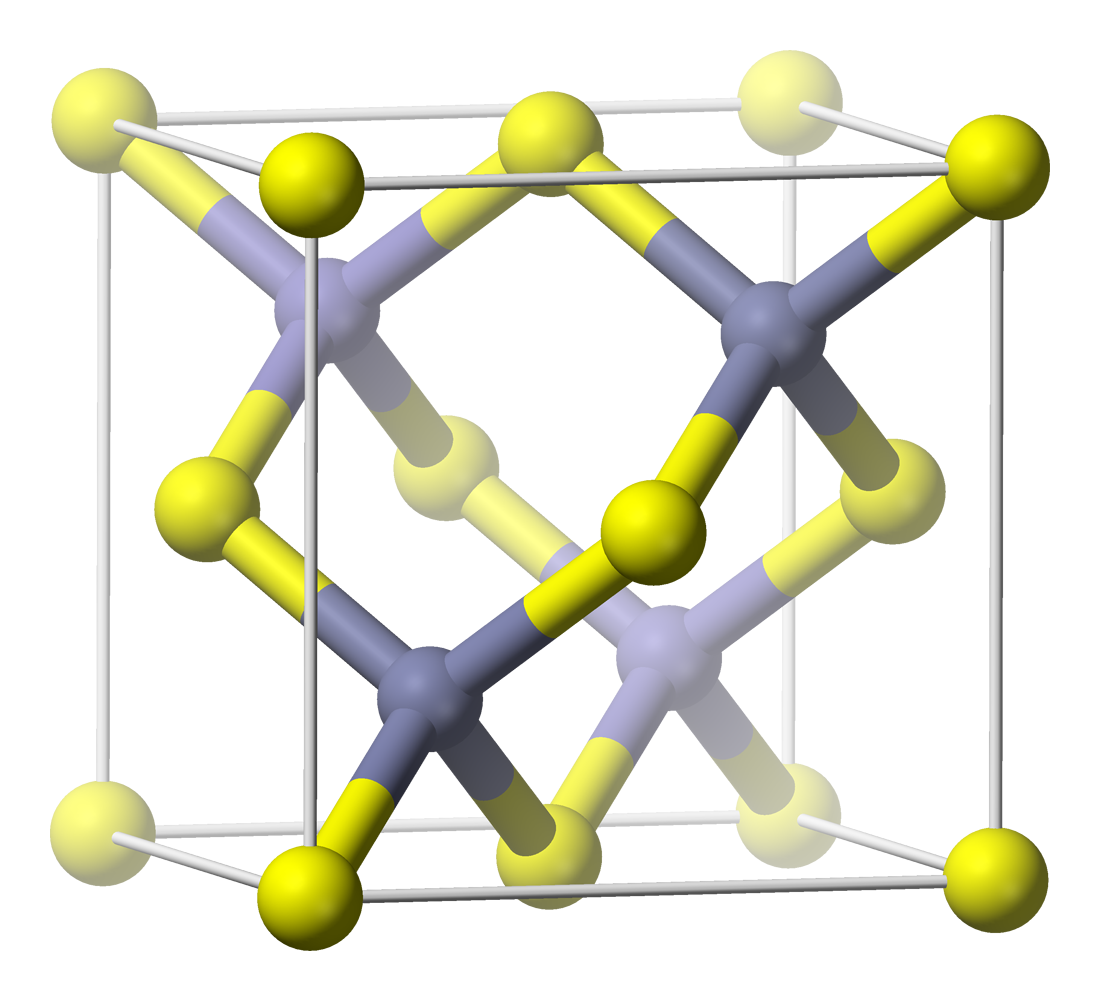
- Structure of CuBr

Names
- Other names Cuprous bromide

Identifiers
CAS Number	7787-70-4
3D model (JSmol)	Interactive image
ChemSpider	22995
ECHA InfoCard	100.029.210
PubChem CID	24593
UNII	R8V209A5G0
CompTox Dashboard (EPA)	DTXSID6052530
- InChI: InChI=1S/BrH.Cu/h1H;/q;+1/p-1 Key: NKNDPYCGAZPOFS-UHFFFAOYSA-M; InChI=1/BrH.Cu/h1H;/q;+1/p-1 Key: NKNDPYCGAZPOFS-REWHXWOFAY
- SMILES: Br[Cu]

Properties
Chemical formula	CuBr
Molar mass	143.450 g·mol^{−1}
Appearance	white powder
Density	4.98 g/cm^{3}
Melting point	483 °C (901 °F; 756 K)
Boiling point	1,345 °C (2,453 °F; 1,618 K)
Solubility in water	0.0012 g/100 g (20 °C (68 °F))
Solubility product (K_{sp})	6.27×10^{−9}
Band gap	1.00 eV
Magnetic susceptibility (χ)	−49.0×10^{−6} cm^{3}/mol
Refractive index (n_{D})	2.116

Structure
Crystal structure	Tetragonal [129]
Space group	P4/nmm
Point group	4/mmm
Lattice constant	a = 3.85 Å, b = 3.85 Å, c = 6.04 Å α = 90°, β = 90°, γ = 90°
Lattice volume (V)	89.78 Å^{3}
Formula units (Z)	2
Coordination geometry	Tetrahedral at Cu^{1+}

Thermochemistry
Heat capacity (C)	54.7 J⋅mol^{−1}⋅K^{−1}
Std molar entropy (S^{⦵}_{298})	96.1 J⋅mol^{−1}⋅K^{−1}
Std enthalpy of formation (Δ_{f}H^{⦵}_{298})	−104.6 kJ⋅mol^{−1}
Gibbs free energy (Δ_{f}G^{⦵})	−100.8 kJ⋅mol^{−1}
Enthalpy of fusion (Δ_{f}H^{⦵}_{fus})	5.1 kJ⋅mol^{−1}

Hazards
- GHS labelling
Pictograms	(GHS05: Corrosive) (GHS07: Exclamation mark) (GHS09: Environmental hazard)
Signal word	Danger
Hazard statements	H302+H312, H315, H318, H410
Precautionary statements	P264, P270, P273, P280, P301+P312+P330, P302+P352+P312, P305+P351+P338+P310, P332+P313, P362, P391, P501
NFPA 704 (fire diamond)	2 0 0
Threshold limit value (TLV)	1 mg/m^{3} (TWA)
- Lethal dose or concentration (LD, LC)
LD_{50} (median dose)	336 mg/kg (rat, oral); 1224 mg/kg (rat, dermal)
- NIOSH (US health exposure limits)
PEL (Permissible)	1 mg/m^{3} (TWA, as Cu)
REL (Recommended)	1 mg/m^{3} (TWA, as Cu)
IDLH (Immediate danger)	100 mg/m^{3} (as Cu)

Related compounds
Other anions	Copper(I) chloride; Copper(I) iodide
Other cations	Copper(II) bromide; Mercury(I) bromide; Silver(I) bromide
- Except where otherwise noted, data are given for materials in their standard state (at 25 °C [77 °F], 100 kPa). verify (what is ?) Infobox references

Copper(I) bromide is the chemical compound with the formula CuBr. This white diamagnetic solid adopts a polymeric structure akin to that for zinc sulfide. The compound is widely used in the synthesis of organic compounds and as a lasing medium in copper bromide lasers.

== Properties ==
The compound is white, although samples are often colored due to the presence of copper(II) impurities. The copper(I) ion also oxidizes easily in air. CuBr is insoluble in most solvents due to its polymeric structure, which features four-coordinated, tetrahedral Cu centers interconnected by bromide ligands (ZnS structure).

Thermal excitation of copper(I) bromide vapour yields a blue-violet emission which is of greater saturation than known copper(I) chloride emission. Copper(I) bromide is hence an advantageous emitter in pyrotechnic flames.

== Preparation ==
It is commonly prepared by the reduction of cupric salts with sulfite in the presence of bromide. For example, the reduction of copper(II) bromide with sulfite yields copper(I) bromide and hydrogen bromide:

2 CuBr_{2} + H_{2}O + SO^{2−}_{3} → 2 CuBr + SO^{2−}_{4} + 2 HBr

== Applications in organic chemistry ==
In the Sandmeyer reaction, CuBr is employed to convert diazonium salts into the corresponding aryl bromides:

ArN^{+}_{2} + CuBr → ArBr + N_{2} + Cu^{+}

The aforementioned complex CuBr(S(CH_{3})_{2}) is widely used to generate organocopper reagents. Related CuBr complexes are catalysts for atom transfer radical polymerization (ATRP) and copper-catalyzed cross dehydrogenative couplings (CDCs).

== Reactions ==
Upon treatment with Lewis bases, CuBr converts to molecular adducts. For example, with dimethyl sulfide (S(CH_{3})_{2}), the colorless complex is formed:

CuBr + S(CH_{3})_{2} → CuBr(S(CH_{3})_{2})

In this coordination complex, the copper is two-coordinate, with a linear geometry. Other soft ligands afford related complexes. For example, triphenylphosphine (P(C_{6}H_{5})_{3}) gives CuBr(P(C_{6}H_{5})_{3}), although this species has a more complex structure.
