= Copper compounds =

Chemical compounds containing copper

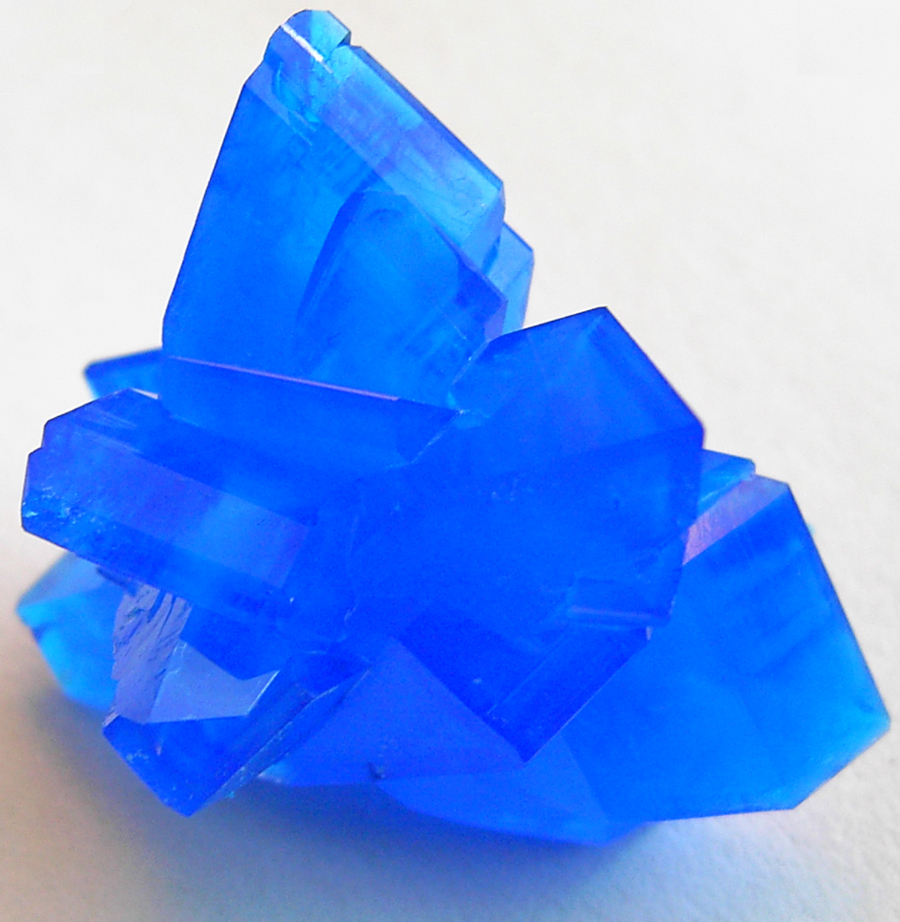
A sample of copper(II) sulfate pentahydrate, a compound of copper

Copper forms a rich variety of compounds, usually with oxidation states +1 and +2, which are often called cuprous and cupric, respectively. Copper compounds, whether organic complexes or organometallics, promote or catalyse numerous chemical and biological processes.

== Binary compounds ==
As with other elements, the simplest compounds of copper are binary compounds, i.e. those containing only two elements, the principal examples being oxides, sulfides, and halides. Both cuprous and cupric oxides are known. Among the numerous copper sulfides, important examples include copper(I) sulfide and copper(II) sulfide.

Cuprous halides with fluorine, chlorine, bromine, and iodine are known, as are cupric halides with fluorine, chlorine, and bromine. Attempts to prepare copper(II) iodide yield only copper(I) iodide and iodine.

2 Cu^{2+} + 4 I^{−} → 2 CuI + I_{2}

== Coordination chemistry ==
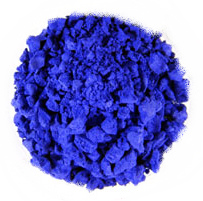
Copper(II) gives a deep blue coloration in the presence of ammonia ligands. The one used here is tetraamminecopper(II) sulfate.

=== Cu–O and Cu–N complexes ===
Copper forms coordination complexes with many oxygen- and nitrogen-donor ligands. In aqueous solution, copper(II) exists as [Cu(H_{2}O)_{6}]^{2+}. This complex exhibits the fastest water exchange rate (speed of water ligands attaching and detaching) for any transition metal aquo complex. Adding aqueous sodium hydroxide causes the precipitation of light blue solid copper(II) hydroxide. A simplified equation is:

Pourbaix diagram for copper in uncomplexed media (anions other than OH^{−} not considered). Ion concentration 0.001 m (mol/kg water). Temperature 25 °C.

Cu^{2+} + 2 OH^{−} → Cu(OH)_{2}

Aqueous ammonia results in the same precipitate. Upon adding excess ammonia, the precipitate dissolves, forming Schweizer's reagent, which contains tetraamminecopper(II):

Cu(H_{2}O)_{4}(OH)_{2} + 4 NH_{3} → [Cu(H_{2}O)_{2}(NH_{3})_{4}]^{2+} + 2 H_{2}O + 2 OH^{−}

Many other oxyanions form complexes; these include copper(II) acetate, copper(II) nitrate, and copper(II) carbonate. Copper(II) sulfate forms a blue crystalline pentahydrate, the most familiar copper compound in the laboratory. It is used in a fungicide called the Bordeaux mixture.

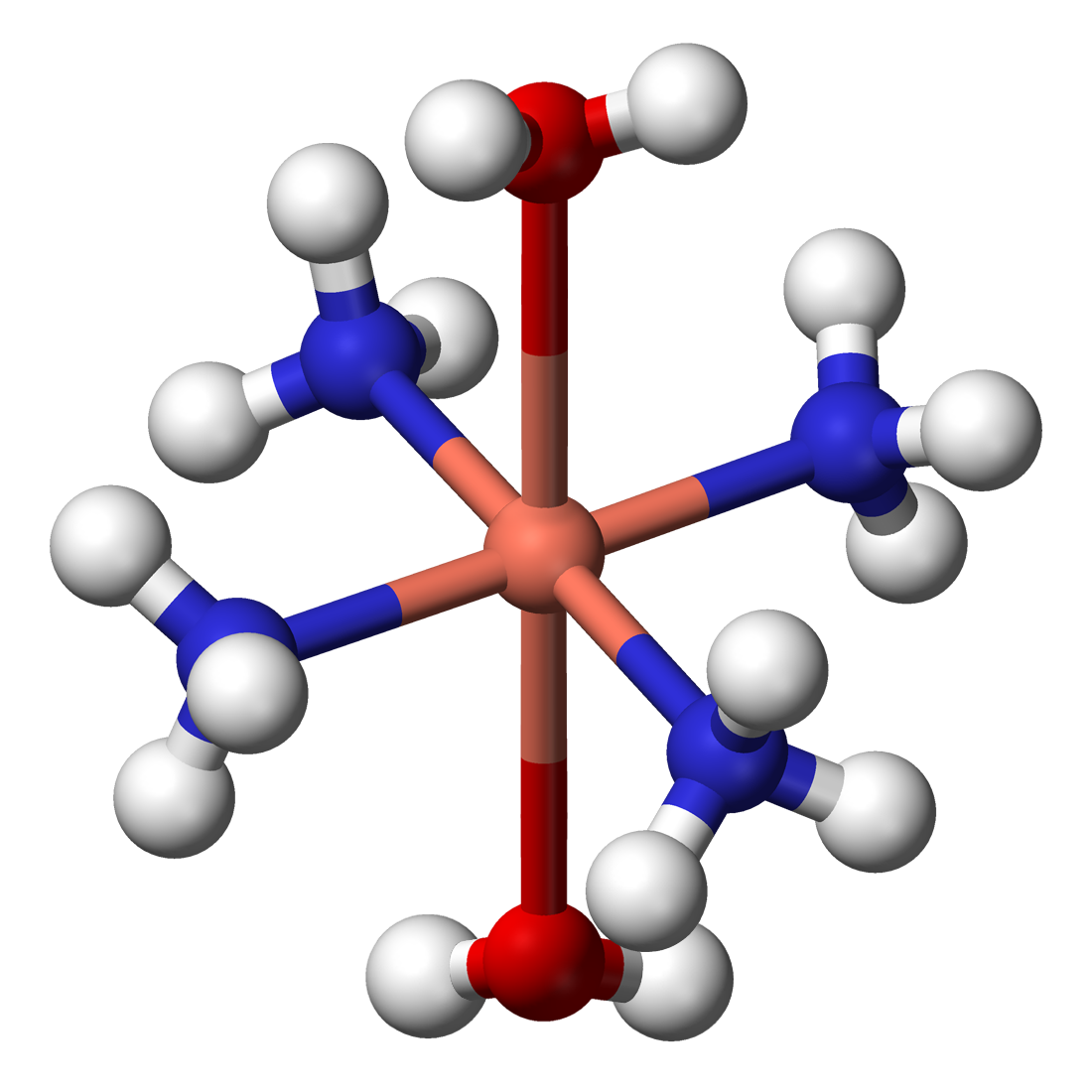
Ball-and-stick model of the complex [Cu(NH_{3})_{4}(H_{2}O)_{2}]^{2+}, illustrating the octahedral coordination geometry common for copper(II).

Polyols, compounds containing more than one alcohol functional group, generally interact with cupric salts. For example, copper salts are used to test for reducing sugars. Specifically, using Benedict's reagent and Fehling's solution the presence of the sugar is signaled by a color change from blue Cu(II) to reddish copper(I) oxide. Schweizer's reagent and related complexes with ethylenediamine and other amines dissolve cellulose. Amino acids such as cystine form very stable chelate complexes with copper(II). Many wet-chemical tests for copper ions exist, one involving potassium ferrocyanide, which gives a brown precipitate with copper(II) salts.

Molecular geometry varies with the ligand and the oxidation state of the copper. Copper(I) complexes are typically two-coordinate linear, three-coordinate trigonal–planar, and four-coordinate tetrahedral, whereas copper(II) complexes are typically octahedral.

=== Cu–X complexes ===
Copper also forms complexes with halides. In Cs_{2}CuCl_{4}, CuCl_{4}^{2−} exhibits a distorted (flattened) tetrahedral geometry, whereas in [Pt(NH_{3})_{4}][CuCl_{4}], it adopts a planar configuration. Green CuBr_{3}^{−} and violet CuBr_{4}^{2−} are also known. Monovalent copper forms luminescent Cu_{n}X_{n} clusters (where X = Br, Cl, I), exhibiting diverse optical properties.

== Organocopper chemistry ==
Compounds that contain a carbon-copper bond are known as organocopper compounds. They are very reactive towards oxygen to form copper(I) oxide and have many uses in chemistry. They are synthesized by treating copper(I) compounds with Grignard reagents, terminal alkynes or organolithium reagents; in particular, the last reaction described produces a Gilman reagent. These can undergo substitution with alkyl halides to form coupling products; as such, they are important in the field of organic synthesis. Copper(I) acetylide is highly shock-sensitive but is an intermediate in reactions such as the Cadiot-Chodkiewicz coupling and the Sonogashira coupling. Conjugate addition to enones and carbocupration of alkynes can also be achieved with organocopper compounds. Copper(I) forms a variety of weak complexes with alkenes and carbon monoxide, especially in the presence of amine ligands.

== Copper(III) and copper(IV) ==
Copper(III) is most often found in oxides. A simple example is potassium cuprate, KCuO_{2}, a blue-black solid. The most extensively studied copper(III) compounds are the cuprate superconductors. Yttrium barium copper oxide (YBa_{2}Cu_{3}O_{7}) consists of both Cu(II) and Cu(III) centres. Like oxide, fluoride is a highly basic anion and is known to stabilize metal ions in high oxidation states. Both copper(III) and even copper(IV) fluorides are known, K_{3}CuF_{6} and Cs_{2}CuF_{6}, respectively.

Some copper proteins form oxo complexes, which also feature copper(III). With tetrapeptides, purple-colored copper(III) complexes are stabilized by the deprotonated amide ligands.

Complexes of copper(III) are also found as intermediates in reactions of organocopper compounds. For example, in the Kharasch–Sosnovsky reaction.

== See also ==
- Nickel compounds
- Zinc compounds
