= Copper =

Copper, _{29}Cu
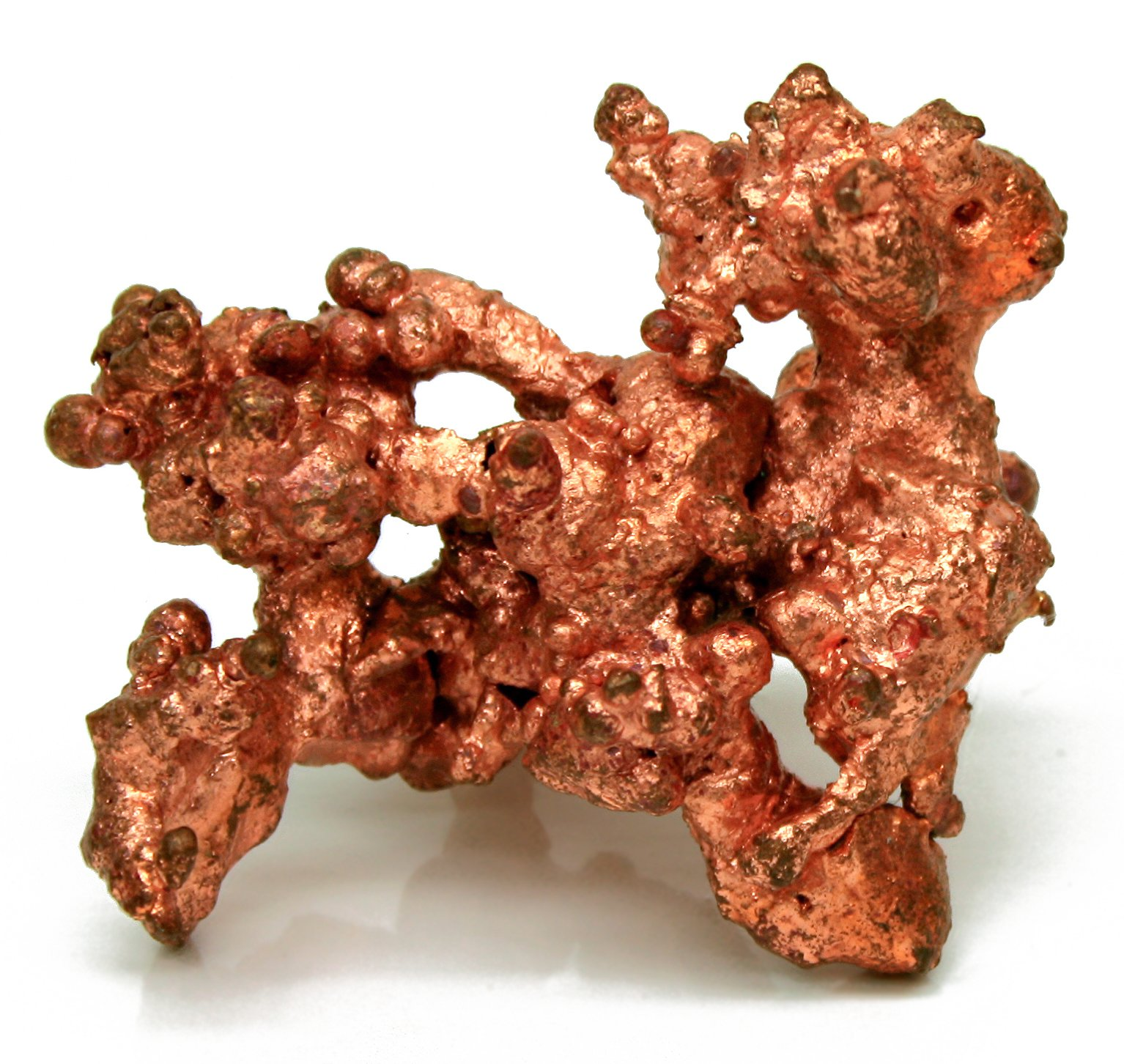

Copper
- Alternative name: Cuprum, pronounced: /ˈkjuːprəm/ (KYOO-prəm)
- Appearance: Red-orange metallic luster

Standard atomic weight A_{r}°(Cu)
- 63.546±0.003; 63.546±0.003 (abridged)

Copper in the periodic table
Hydrogen																															Helium
Lithium	Beryllium																									Boron	Carbon	Nitrogen	Oxygen	Fluorine	Neon
Sodium	Magnesium																									Aluminium	Silicon	Phosphorus	Sulfur	Chlorine	Argon
Potassium	Calcium															Scandium	Titanium	Vanadium	Chromium	Manganese	Iron	Cobalt	Nickel	Copper	Zinc	Gallium	Germanium	Arsenic	Selenium	Bromine	Krypton
Rubidium	Strontium															Yttrium	Zirconium	Niobium	Molybdenum	Technetium	Ruthenium	Rhodium	Palladium	Silver	Cadmium	Indium	Tin	Antimony	Tellurium	Iodine	Xenon
Caesium	Barium	Lanthanum	Cerium	Praseodymium	Neodymium	Promethium	Samarium	Europium	Gadolinium	Terbium	Dysprosium	Holmium	Erbium	Thulium	Ytterbium	Lutetium	Hafnium	Tantalum	Tungsten	Rhenium	Osmium	Iridium	Platinum	Gold	Mercury (element)	Thallium	Lead	Bismuth	Polonium	Astatine	Radon
Francium	Radium	Actinium	Thorium	Protactinium	Uranium	Neptunium	Plutonium	Americium	Curium	Berkelium	Californium	Einsteinium	Fermium	Mendelevium	Nobelium	Lawrencium	Rutherfordium	Dubnium	Seaborgium	Bohrium	Hassium	Meitnerium	Darmstadtium	Roentgenium	Copernicium	Nihonium	Flerovium	Moscovium	Livermorium	Tennessine	Oganesson
–
↑
Cu
↓
Ag
nickel ← copper → zinc
- Atomic number (Z): 29
- Group: group 11
- Period: period 4
- Block: d-block
- Electron configuration: [Ar] 3d^{10} 4s^{1}
- Electrons per shell: 2, 8, 18, 1

Physical properties
- Phase at STP: solid
- Melting point: 1357.77 K (1084.62 °C, 1984.32 °F)
- Boiling point: 2835 K (2562 °C, 4643 °F)
- Density (at 20° C): 8.935 g/cm^{3}
- (at STP): 8,944 g/L
- when liquid (at m.p.): 8.02 g/cm^{3}
- Heat of fusion: 13.26 kJ/mol
- Heat of vaporization: 300.4 kJ/mol
- Molar heat capacity: 24.440 J/(mol·K)
- Specific heat capacity: 384.603 J/(kg·K)
Vapor pressure
P (Pa)	1	10	100	1 k	10 k	100 k
at T (K)	1509	1661	1850	2089	2404	2834

Atomic properties
- Oxidation states: common: +2 −2, −1, 0, +1, +3, +4
- Electronegativity: Pauling scale: 1.90
- Ionization energies: 1st: 745.5 kJ/mol; 2nd: 1957.9 kJ/mol; 3rd: 3555 kJ/mol; (more)
- Atomic radius: empirical: 128 pm
- Covalent radius: 132±4 pm
- Van der Waals radius: 140 pm
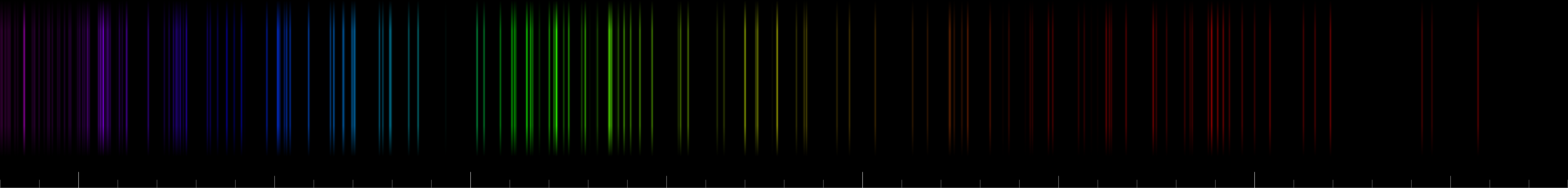
- Spectral lines of copper

Other properties
- Natural occurrence: primordial
- Crystal structure: face-centered cubic (fcc) (cF4)
- Lattice constant: a = 361.50 pm (at 20 °C)
- Thermal expansion: 16.64×10^{−6}/K (at 20 °C)
- Thermal conductivity: 401 W/(m⋅K)
- Electrical resistivity: 16.78 nΩ⋅m (at 20 °C)
- Magnetic ordering: diamagnetic
- Molar magnetic susceptibility: −5.46×10^{−6} cm^{3}/mol
- Young's modulus: 110–128 GPa
- Shear modulus: 48 GPa
- Bulk modulus: 140 GPa
- Speed of sound thin rod: (annealed); 3810 m/s (at r.t.)
- Poisson ratio: 0.34
- Mohs hardness: 3.0
- Vickers hardness: 343–369 MPa
- Brinell hardness: 235–878 MPa
- CAS Number: 7440-50-8

History
- Naming: after Cyprus, principal mining place in Roman era (Cyprium)
- Discovery: Middle East (9000 BC)
- Symbol: "Cu": from Latin cuprum

Isotopes of copper
Main isotopes			Decay	
Isotope	abundance	half-life (t_{1/2})	mode	product
^{63}Cu	69.15%	stable		
^{64}Cu	synth	12.70 h	β^{+}	^{64}Ni
^{64}Cu	synth	12.70 h	β^{−}	^{64}Zn
^{65}Cu	30.85%	stable		
^{67}Cu	synth	61.83 h	β^{−}	^{67}Zn

Copper is a chemical element; it has symbol Cu (from Latin cuprum) and atomic number 29. It is a soft, malleable, and ductile metal with very high thermal and electrical conductivity. A freshly exposed surface of pure copper has a pinkish-orange color. Copper is used as a conductor of heat and electricity, as a building material, and as a constituent of various metal alloys, such as sterling silver used in jewelry, cupronickel used to make marine hardware and coins, and constantan used in strain gauges and thermocouples for temperature measurement.

Copper is one of the few native metals, meaning metals that occur naturally in a directly usable, unalloyed metallic form. This led to very early human use in several regions, from c. 8000 BC. Thousands of years later, it was the first metal to be smelted from sulfide ores, c. 5000 BC; the first metal to be cast into a shape in a mold, c. 4000 BC; and the first metal to be purposely alloyed with another metal, tin, to create bronze, c. 3500 BC.

Commonly encountered compounds are copper(II) salts, which often impart blue or green colors to such minerals as azurite, malachite, and turquoise, and have been used widely and historically as pigments.

Copper used in buildings, usually for roofing, oxidizes to form a green patina of compounds called verdigris. Copper is sometimes used in decorative art, both in its elemental metal form and in compounds as pigments. Copper compounds are used as bacteriostatic agents, fungicides, and wood preservatives.

Copper is essential to all aerobic organisms. It is particularly associated with oxygen metabolism. For example, it is found in the respiratory enzyme complex cytochrome c oxidase, in the oxygen carrying hemocyanin, and in several hydroxylases. Adult humans contain between 1.4 and 2.1 mg of copper per kilogram of body weight.

== Etymology ==
The name of the metal derives from aes cyprium meaning 'metal of Cyprus' in Latin. In Late Latin this became cuprum. Old English adopted this as coper; copper derives from that word and first used in the 12th century.

== Characteristics ==
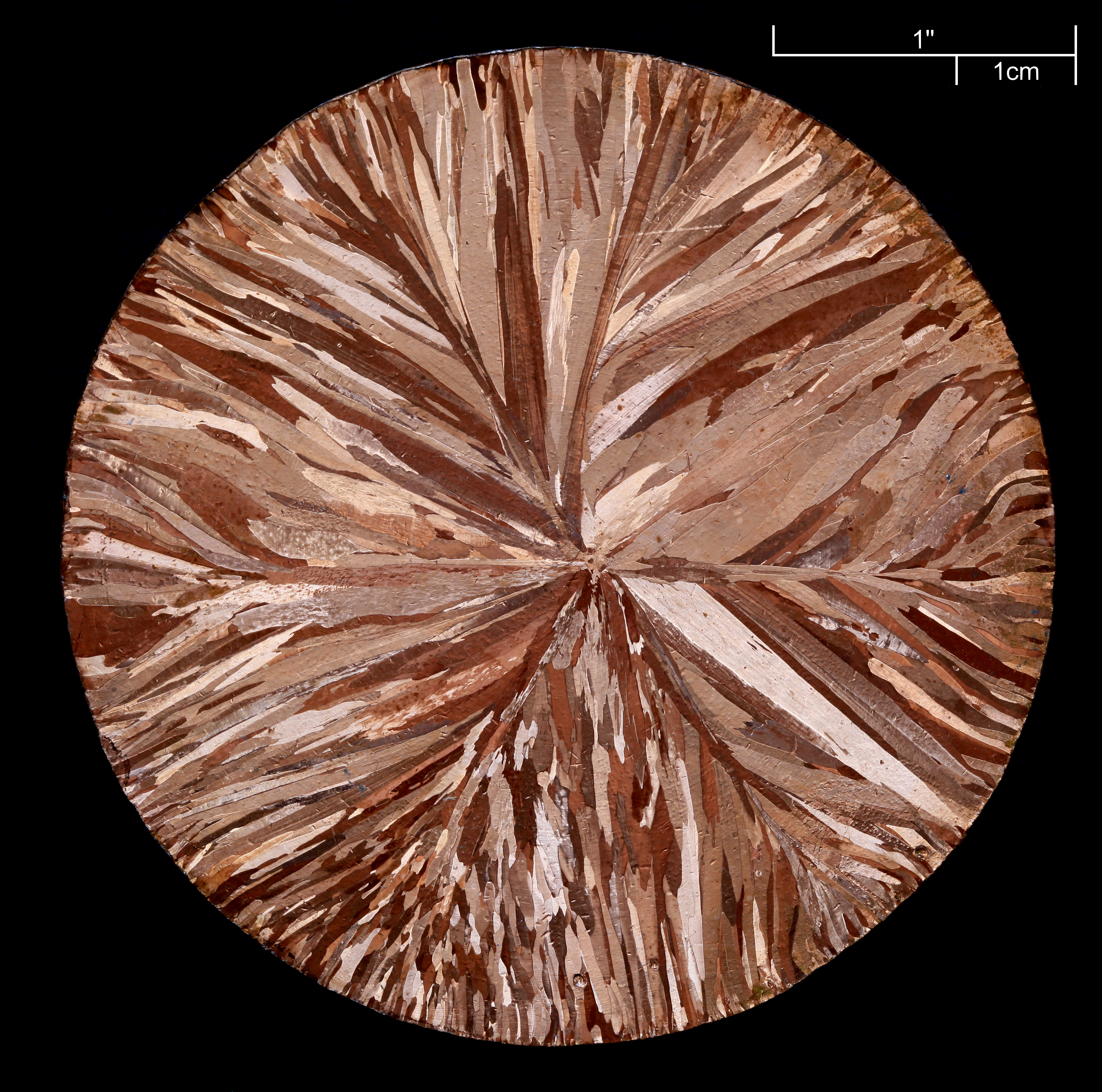
A copper disc (99.95% pure) made by continuous casting; etched to reveal crystallites

Copper just above its melting point keeps its pink luster color when enough light outshines the orange incandescence color.

=== Physical ===
Copper, silver, and gold are in group 11 of the periodic table; these three metals have one s-orbital electron on top of a filled d-electron shell and are characterized by high ductility and electrical and thermal conductivity. The filled d-shells in these elements contribute little to interatomic interactions, which are dominated by the s-electrons through metallic bonds. Unlike metals with incomplete d-shells, metallic bonds in copper are lacking a covalent character and are relatively weak. This observation explains the low hardness and high ductility of single crystals of copper. At the macroscopic scale, introduction of extended defects to the crystal lattice, such as grain boundaries, hinders flow of the material under applied stress, thereby increasing its hardness. For this reason, copper is usually supplied in a fine-grained polycrystalline form, which has greater strength than monocrystalline forms.

The softness of copper partly explains its high electrical conductivity (59.6×10^{6} S/m) and high thermal conductivity, second highest (second only to silver) among pure metals at room temperature. This is because the resistivity to electron transport in metals at room temperature originates primarily from scattering of electrons on thermal vibrations of the lattice, which are relatively weak in a soft metal.

Copper is one of a few metallic elements with a natural color other than gray or silver. Pure copper is orange-red and acquires a reddish tarnish when exposed to air. This is due to the low plasma frequency of the metal, which lies in the red part of the visible spectrum, causing it to absorb the higher-frequency green and blue colors.

As with other metals, if copper is put in contact with another metal in the presence of an electrolyte, galvanic corrosion will occur.

=== Chemical ===
Copper does not react with water, but it does slowly react with atmospheric oxygen to form a layer of brown-black copper oxide which, unlike the rust that forms on iron in moist air, protects the underlying metal from further corrosion (passivation). A green layer of verdigris (copper carbonate) can often be seen on old copper structures, such as the roofing of many older buildings and the Statue of Liberty. Copper tarnishes when exposed to some sulfur compounds, with which it reacts to form various copper sulfides.

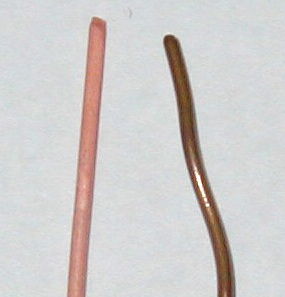
Unoxidized copper wire (left) and oxidized copper wire (right)

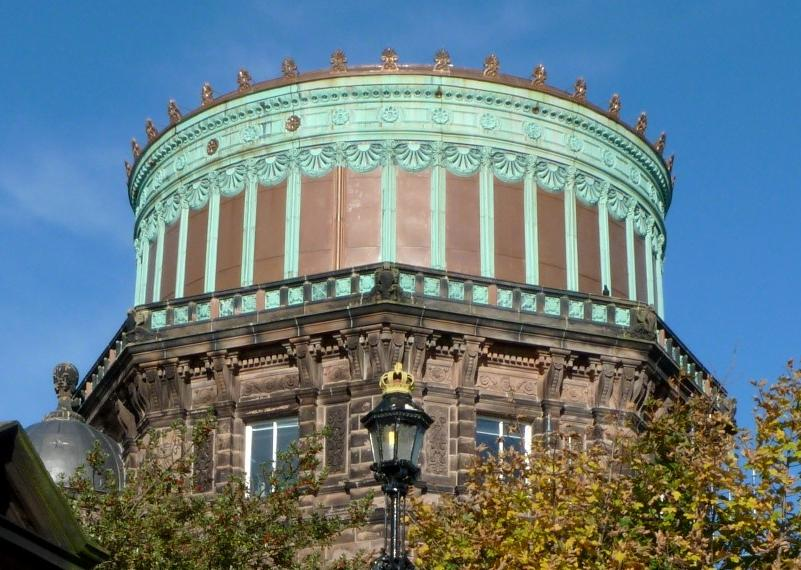
The East Tower of the Royal Observatory, Edinburgh; the original copper was installed in 1894 and the refurbished copper in 1994

=== Isotopes ===
There are 29 isotopes of copper. ^{63}Cu and ^{65}Cu are stable, with ^{63}Cu comprising approximately 69% of naturally occurring copper; both have a spin of 3/2. The other isotopes are radioactive, with the most stable being ^{67}Cu with a half-life of 61.83 hours. Ten metastable isomers have been characterized; ^{68m}Cu is the longest-lived with a half-life of 3.8 minutes. Isotopes with a mass number above 64 decay by β^{−}, whereas those with a mass number below 64 decay by β^{+}. ^{64}Cu, which has a half-life of 12.7 hours, decays both ways.

^{62}Cu and ^{64}Cu have significant applications. ^{62}Cu is used in ^{62}Cu-PTSM as a radioactive tracer for positron emission tomography.

=== Occurrence ===
Copper is produced in massive stars and is present in the Earth's crust in a proportion of about 50 parts per million (ppm). In nature, copper occurs in a variety of minerals, including native copper, copper sulfides such as chalcopyrite, bornite, digenite, covellite, and chalcocite, copper sulfosalts such as tetrahedite-tennantite, and enargite, copper carbonates such as azurite and malachite, and as copper(I) or copper(II) oxides such as cuprite and tenorite, respectively. The largest mass of elemental copper yet discovered weighed 420 tonnes and was found in 1857 on the Keweenaw Peninsula in Michigan, US. Native copper is a polycrystal, with the largest single crystal ever described measuring 4.4 × 3.2 × 3.2 cm. Copper is the 26th most abundant element in Earth's crust, representing 50 ppm compared with 75 ppm for zinc, and 14 ppm for lead.

Typical background concentrations of copper do not exceed 1 ng/m^{3} in the atmosphere; 150 mg/kg in soil; 30 mg/kg in vegetation; 2 μg/L in freshwater and 0.5 μg/L in seawater.

== Production ==
Copper production

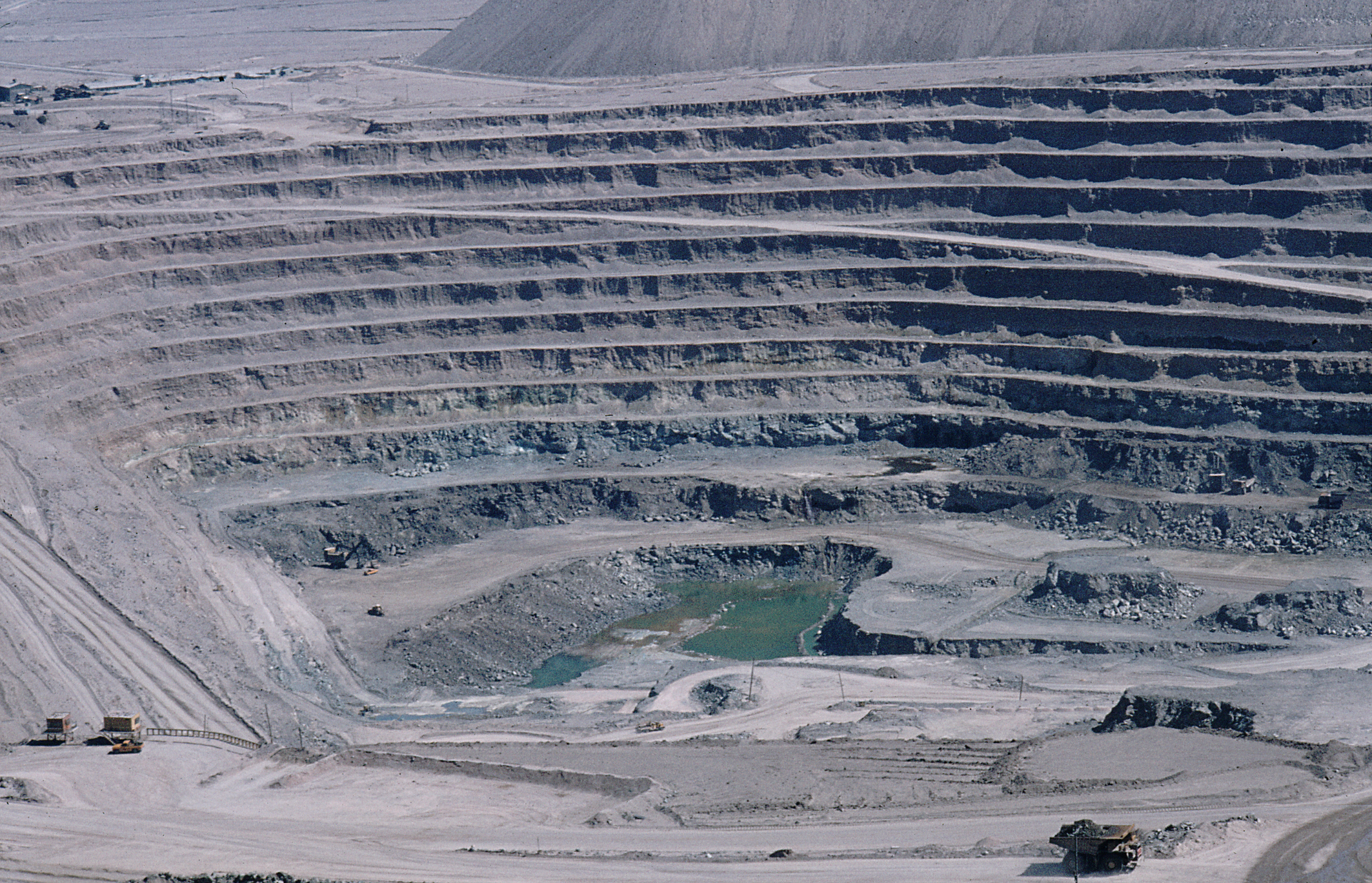
Chuquicamata, in Chile, is one of the world's largest open pit copper mines.

Most copper is mined or extracted as copper sulfides from large open pit mines in porphyry copper deposits that contain 0.4 to 1.0% copper. Sites include Chuquicamata, in Chile, Bingham Canyon Mine, in Utah, United States, and El Chino Mine, in New Mexico, United States. According to the British Geological Survey, in 2005, Chile was the top producer of copper with at least one-third of the world share followed by the United States, Indonesia and Peru. Chile, the world's largest copper producer, supplies the US with 70% of refined copper and alloy imports through 2024. Together with Canada (17%) and Peru (7%), they account for 94% of U.S. copper imports. Copper can also be recovered through the in-situ leach process. Several sites in the state of Arizona are considered prime candidates for this method. The amount of copper in use is increasing and the quantity available is barely sufficient to allow all countries to reach developed world levels of usage. An alternative source of copper for collection currently being researched are polymetallic nodules, which are located at the depths of the Pacific Ocean approximately 3000–6500 meters below sea level. These nodules contain other valuable metals such as cobalt and nickel.

=== Reserves and prices ===
World production trend

Copper has been in use for at least 10,000 years, but more than 95% of all copper ever mined and smelted has been extracted since 1900. As with many natural resources, the total amount of copper on Earth is vast, with around 10^{14} tons in the top kilometer of Earth's crust, which is about 5 million years' worth at the current rate of extraction. However, only a tiny fraction of these reserves is economically viable with present-day prices and technologies. Estimates of copper reserves available for mining vary from 25 to 60 years, depending on core assumptions such as the growth rate. Recycling is a major source of copper in the modern world.

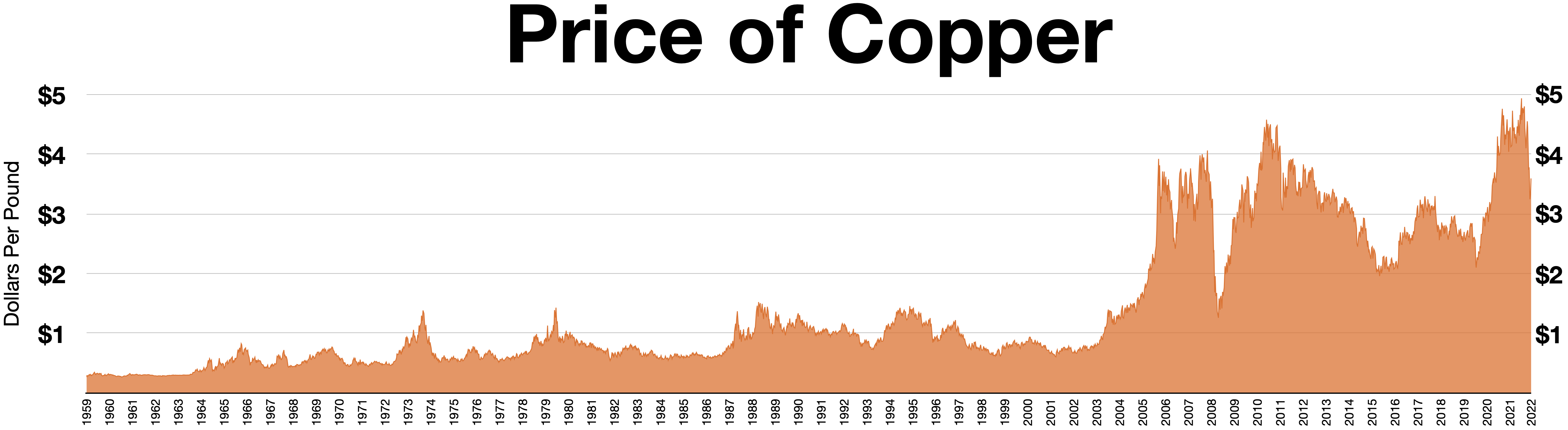
Price of Copper 1959–2022

The price of copper is volatile. After a peak in 2022 the price unexpectedly fell. And by May 2024, the price on the London Metal Exchange has reached an all-time high above $11,000 per ton.

The global market for copper is one of the most commodified and financialized of the commodity markets, and has been so for decades. The top exporters of raw copper were Zambia ($6.95B) and Chile ($2.16B), followed by Democratic Republic of the Congo ($1.41B). Raw copper's top importers were China ($6.13B), Switzerland ($3.15B), and India ($2.05B).

=== Copper demand ===
In 2024, global copper production was estimated at 22.8–22.9 million metric tons. Copper demand is increasing due to the ongoing energy transition to electricity. China accounts for over half the demand.

Global demand for copper is projected to increase by 50% by the year 2040. This substantial growth is driven by the rapid expansion of clean energy technologies, electric vehicle production, and widespread electrical grid infrastructure upgrades over the next two decades.

=== Extraction ===
Scheme of flash smelting process

The great majority of copper ores are sulfides. Common ores are the sulfides chalcopyrite (CuFeS_{2}), bornite (Cu_{5}FeS_{4}) and, to a lesser extent, covellite (CuS) and chalcocite (Cu_{2}S). These ores occur at the level of <1% Cu. Concentration of the ore is required, which begins with comminution followed by froth flotation. The remaining concentrate is smelted, which can be described with two simplified equations:

- Cuprous sulfide is oxidized to cuprous oxide:

2 Cu_{2}S + 3 O_{2} → 2 Cu_{2}O + 2 SO_{2}

- Cuprous oxide reacts with cuprous sulfide to convert to blister copper upon heating:

2 Cu_{2}O + Cu_{2}S → 6 Cu + 2 SO_{2}

This produces crude copper, which is about 98% copper by mass and is then purified by electrolysis to a purity of up to 99%. During the electrolysis small amounts of silver and gold may be precipitated into a sludge that can be reprocessed to recover the precious metals.

Aside from sulfides, another family of ores are oxides. Approximately 15% of the world's copper supply derives from these oxides. The beneficiation process for oxides involves extraction with sulfuric acid solutions followed by electrolysis. In parallel with the above method for "concentrated" sulfide and oxide ores, copper is recovered from mine tailings and heaps. A variety of methods are used including leaching with sulfuric acid, ammonia, ferric chloride. Biological methods are also used.

A potential source of copper is polymetallic nodules, which have an estimated concentration 1.3%.

Flowchart of copper refining (Ingot casting plant of Uralelektromed)
1. Blister copper
2. Smelting
3. Reverberatory furnace
4. Slag removal
5. Copper casting of ingots
6. Casting wheel
7. Ingot removal machine
8. Ingots take-off
9. Rail cars
10. Transportation to the tank house

=== Recycling ===
According to the International Resource Panel's Metal Stocks in Society report, the global per capita stock of copper in use in society is 35–55 kg. Much of this is in more-developed countries (140–300 kg per capita) rather than less-developed countries (30–40 kg per capita). In 2001, a typical automobile contained 20–30 kg of copper. By 2014, the copper and copper alloy content of internal combustion engine vehicles decreased to 16.8 kg, but increased again to 24.5 kg by 2023. At the same time, a battery electric vehicle already contains around 91 kg of copper and copper alloys.

Like aluminium, copper is recyclable without any loss of quality, both from raw state and from manufactured products. An estimated 80% of all copper ever mined is still in use today. In volume, copper is the third most recycled metal after iron and aluminium. As of 2023, recycled copper supplies about one-third of global demand.

The process of recycling copper is roughly the same as is used to extract copper but requires fewer steps. High-purity scrap copper is melted in a furnace and then reduced and cast into billets and ingots. Lower-purity scrap is melted to form black copper (70–90% pure, containing impurities such as iron, zinc, tin, and nickel), followed by oxidation of impurities in a converter to form blister copper (96–98% pure), which is then refined as before.

=== Environmental impacts ===
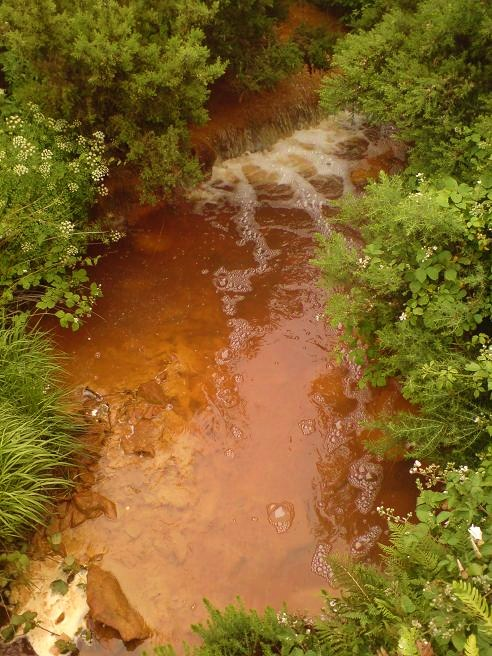
Acid mine drainage from the disused Parys Mountain copper mines

Copper mining is energy intensive. The extraction generates a substantial waste stream, including potentially toxic dust and heavy metal contamination near sites where it is refined. Since most copper ores are sulfides, smelting is required. Smelting generates sulfur dioxide, a precursor to atmospheric sulfuric acid, unless it is captured. About 15% of copper comes from low grade (dilute) ore bodies. Processing is achieved by hydrometallurgy, requiring acidic extractants, which remains in the waste streams after electrolytic deposition of the copper.

== Alloys ==
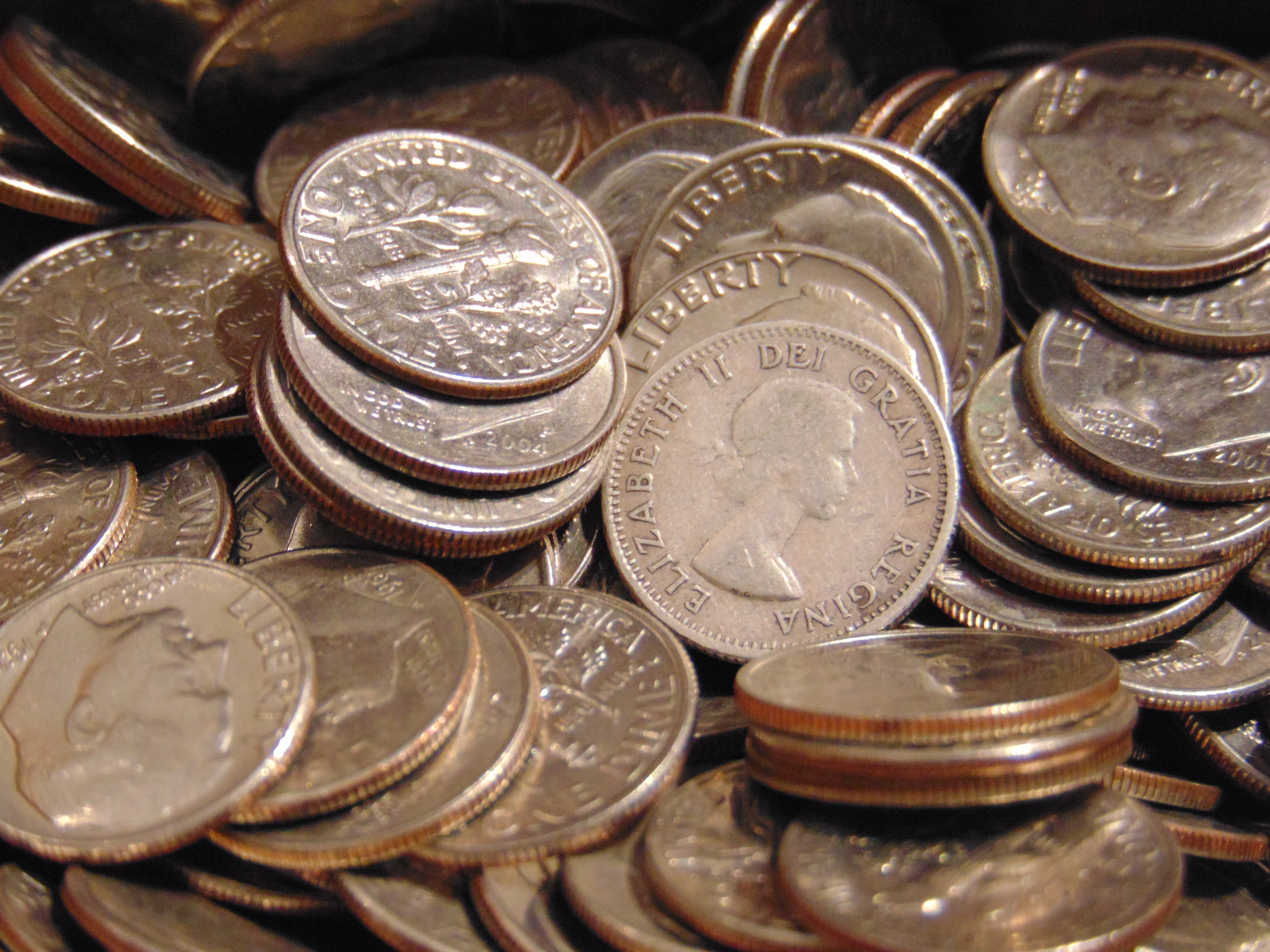
Copper alloys are widely used in the production of coinage; seen here are two examples – post-1964 American dimes, which are composed of the alloy cupronickel and a pre-1968 Canadian dime, which is composed of an alloy of 80 percent silver and 20 percent copper.

Numerous copper alloys have been formulated, many with important uses. Brass is an alloy of copper and zinc. Bronze usually refers to copper–tin alloys, but can refer to any alloy of copper such as aluminium bronze. Copper-tin bronzes with various additional metals have been used to create bells for centuries; the composition of the alloy directly affects the tone and mechanical characteristics of the instrument. Copper is one of the most important constituents of silver and karat gold solders used in the jewelry industry, modifying the color, hardness and melting point of the resulting alloys. Some lead-free solders consist of tin alloyed with a small proportion of copper and other metals.

The alloy of copper and nickel, called cupronickel, is used in low-denomination coins, often for the outer cladding. The US five-cent coin (currently called a nickel) consists of 75% copper and 25% nickel in homogeneous composition. Prior to the introduction of cupronickel, which was widely adopted by countries in the latter half of the 20th century, alloys of copper and silver were also used, with the United States using an alloy of 90% silver and 10% copper until 1965, when circulating silver was removed from all coins with the exception of the half dollar—these were debased to an alloy of 40% silver and 60% copper between 1965 and 1970. The alloy of 90% copper and 10% nickel, remarkable for its resistance to corrosion, is used for various objects exposed to seawater, though it is vulnerable to the sulfides sometimes found in polluted harbors and estuaries. Alloys of copper with aluminium (about 7%) have a golden color and are used in decorations. Shakudō is a Japanese decorative alloy of copper containing a low percentage of gold, typically 4–10%, that can be patinated to a dark blue or black color.

== Compounds ==
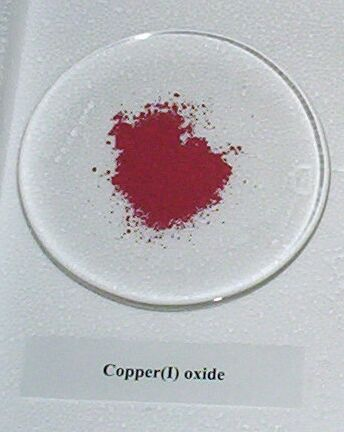
A sample of copper(I) oxide

Copper forms a rich variety of compounds, usually with oxidation states +1 and +2, which are often called cuprous and cupric, respectively. Copper compounds promote or catalyse numerous chemical and biological processes.

=== Binary compounds ===
As with other elements, the simplest compounds of copper are binary compounds, i.e. those containing only two elements, the principal examples being oxides, sulfides, and halides. Both cuprous and cupric oxides are known. Numerous copper sulfides are known, being mainly of interest as ores. The stoichiometrically simplest examples copper(I) sulfide (Cu_{2}S) and copper monosulfide (CuS).

Cuprous chloride, bromide, and iodide are known, but copper(I) fluoride remains elusive. Cupric fluoride, chloride, and bromide are also well characterized. Attempts to prepare copper(II) iodide yield only copper(I) iodide and iodine.

2 Cu^{2+} + 4 I^{−} → 2 CuI + I_{2}

=== Coordination chemistry ===
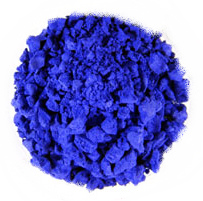
Copper(II) gives a deep blue coloration in the presence of ammonia ligands. The one used here is tetraamminecopper(II) sulfate.

Copper forms coordination complexes with ligands. In aqueous solution, copper(II) exists as [Cu(H_{2}O)_{6}]^{2+}. This complex exhibits the fastest water exchange rate (speed of water ligands attaching and detaching) for any transition metal aquo complex. Adding aqueous sodium hydroxide causes the precipitation of light blue solid copper(II) hydroxide. A simplified equation is:

Pourbaix diagram for copper in uncomplexed media (anions other than OH- not considered). Ion concentration 0.001 m (mol/kg water). Temperature 25 °C.

Cu^{2+} + 2 OH^{−} → Cu(OH)_{2}

Aqueous ammonia results in the same precipitate. Upon adding excess ammonia, the precipitate dissolves, forming tetraamminecopper(II):

Cu(H_{2}O)_{4}(OH)_{2} + 4 NH_{3} → [Cu(H_{2}O)_{2}(NH_{3})_{4}]^{2+} + 2 H_{2}O + 2 OH^{−}

Many other oxyanions form complexes; these include copper(II) acetate, copper(II) nitrate, and copper(II) carbonate. Copper(II) sulfate forms a blue crystalline pentahydrate, the most familiar copper compound in the laboratory. It is used in a fungicide called the Bordeaux mixture.

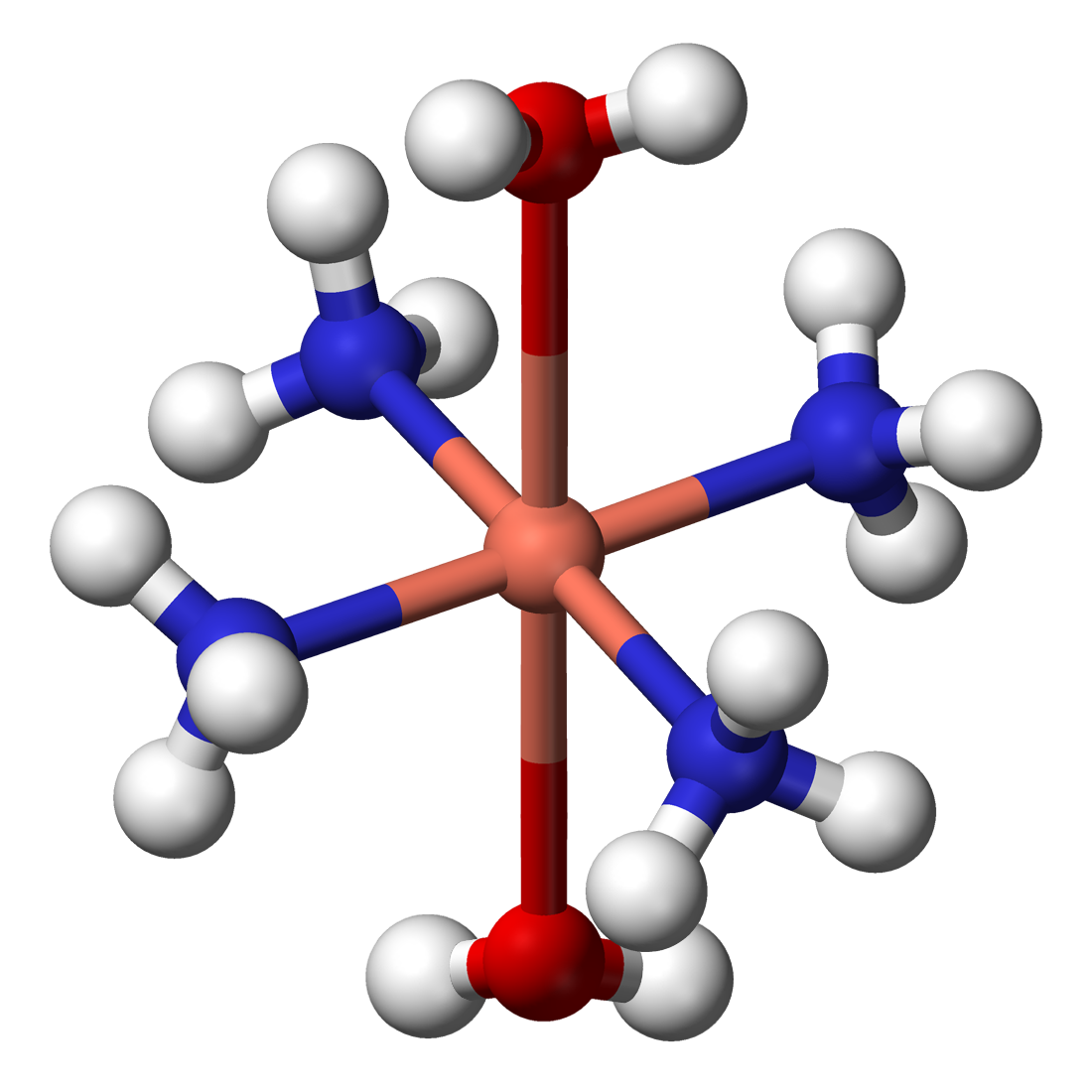
Ball-and-stick model of the complex [Cu(NH_{3})_{4}(H_{2}O)_{2}]^{2+}, illustrating the octahedral coordination geometry common for copper(II)

Polyols, compounds containing more than one alcohol functional group, generally interact with cupric salts. For example, copper salts are used to test for reducing sugars. Specifically, using Benedict's reagent and Fehling's solution the presence of the sugar is signaled by a color change from blue Cu(II) to reddish copper(I) oxide. Schweizer's reagent and related complexes with ethylenediamine and other amines dissolve cellulose. Amino acids form very stable chelate complexes with copper(II).

=== Organocopper chemistry ===
Compounds that contain a carbon-copper bond are known as organocopper compounds. They are very reactive towards oxygen to form copper(I) oxide and have many uses in chemistry. They are synthesized by treating copper(I) compounds with Grignard reagents, terminal alkynes or organolithium reagents; in particular, the last reaction described produces a Gilman reagent. These can undergo substitution with alkyl halides to form coupling products; as such, they are important in the field of organic synthesis. Copper(I) acetylide is highly shock-sensitive but is an intermediate in reactions such as the Cadiot–Chodkiewicz coupling and the Sonogashira coupling. Conjugate addition to enones and carbocupration of alkynes can also be achieved with organocopper compounds. Copper(I) forms a variety of weak complexes with alkenes and carbon monoxide, especially in the presence of amine ligands.

=== Copper(III) and copper(IV) ===
Copper(III) is most often found in oxides. A simple example is potassium cuprate, KCuO_{2}, a blue-black solid. The most extensively studied copper(III) compounds are the cuprate superconductors. Yttrium barium copper oxide (YBa_{2}Cu_{3}O_{7}) consists of both Cu(II) and Cu(III) centres. Like oxide, fluoride is a highly basic anion and is known to stabilize metal ions in high oxidation states. Both copper(III) and even copper(IV) fluorides are known, K_{3}CuF_{6} and Cs_{2}CuF_{6}, respectively.

Some copper proteins form oxo complexes, which, in extensively studied synthetic analog systems, feature copper(III). With tetrapeptides, purple-colored copper(III) complexes are stabilized by the deprotonated amide ligands.

Complexes of copper(III) are also found as intermediates in reactions of organocopper compounds, for example in the Kharasch–Sosnovsky reaction.

== Biological role ==
=== Biochemistry ===
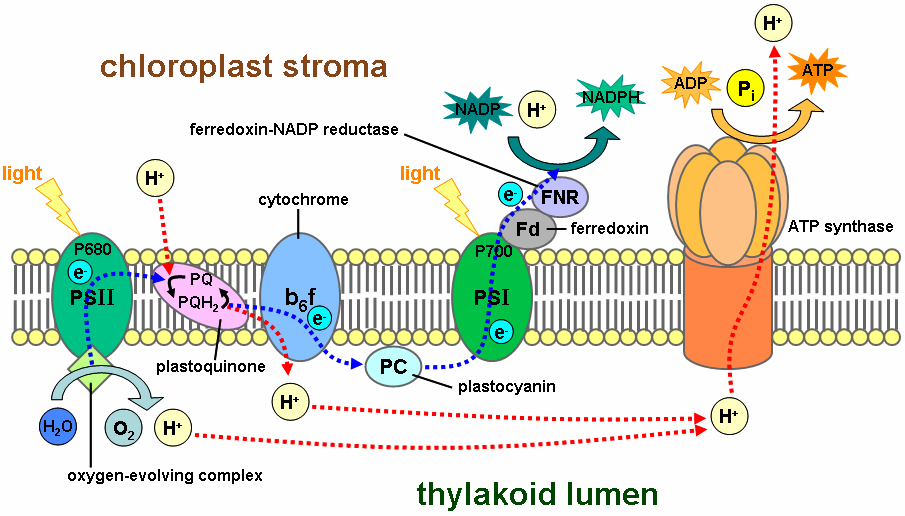
Photosynthesis functions by an elaborate electron transport chain within the thylakoid membrane. A central link in this chain is plastocyanin, a blue copper protein.

The biological role for copper commenced with the appearance of oxygen in Earth's atmosphere. Copper proteins have diverse roles in biological electron transport and oxygen transportation, processes that exploit the easy interconversion of Cu(I) and Cu(II). Copper is essential in the aerobic respiration of all eukaryotes. In mitochondria, it is found in cytochrome c oxidase, which is the last protein in oxidative phosphorylation which stores energy in ATP. The copper atoms are alternately reduced and oxidized during the electron transfer to oxygen. Copper is also found in many superoxide dismutases, proteins that catalyze the decomposition of superoxides by converting it (by disproportionation) to oxygen and hydrogen peroxide:

- Cu^{2+}-SOD + O_{2}^{−} → Cu^{+}-SOD + O_{2} (reduction of copper; oxidation of superoxide)
- Cu^{+}-SOD + O_{2}^{−} + 2H^{+} → Cu^{2+}-SOD + H_{2}O_{2} (oxidation of copper; reduction of superoxide)

The protein hemocyanin is the oxygen carrier in most mollusks and some arthropods such as the horseshoe crab (Limulus polyphemus). Because hemocyanin is blue, these organisms have blue blood rather than the red blood of iron-based hemoglobin. Structurally related to hemocyanin are the laccases and tyrosinases. Instead of reversibly binding oxygen, these proteins hydroxylate substrates, illustrated by their role in the formation of lacquers.

Several copper proteins, such as the blue copper proteins, do not interact directly with substrates; hence they are not enzymes. These proteins relay electrons by the process called electron transfer. A unique tetranuclear copper center has been found in nitrous-oxide reductase.

Copper levels are closely regulated in both prokaryotic and eukaryotic cells to balance critical physiological need but avoid toxicity.

=== Nutrition ===
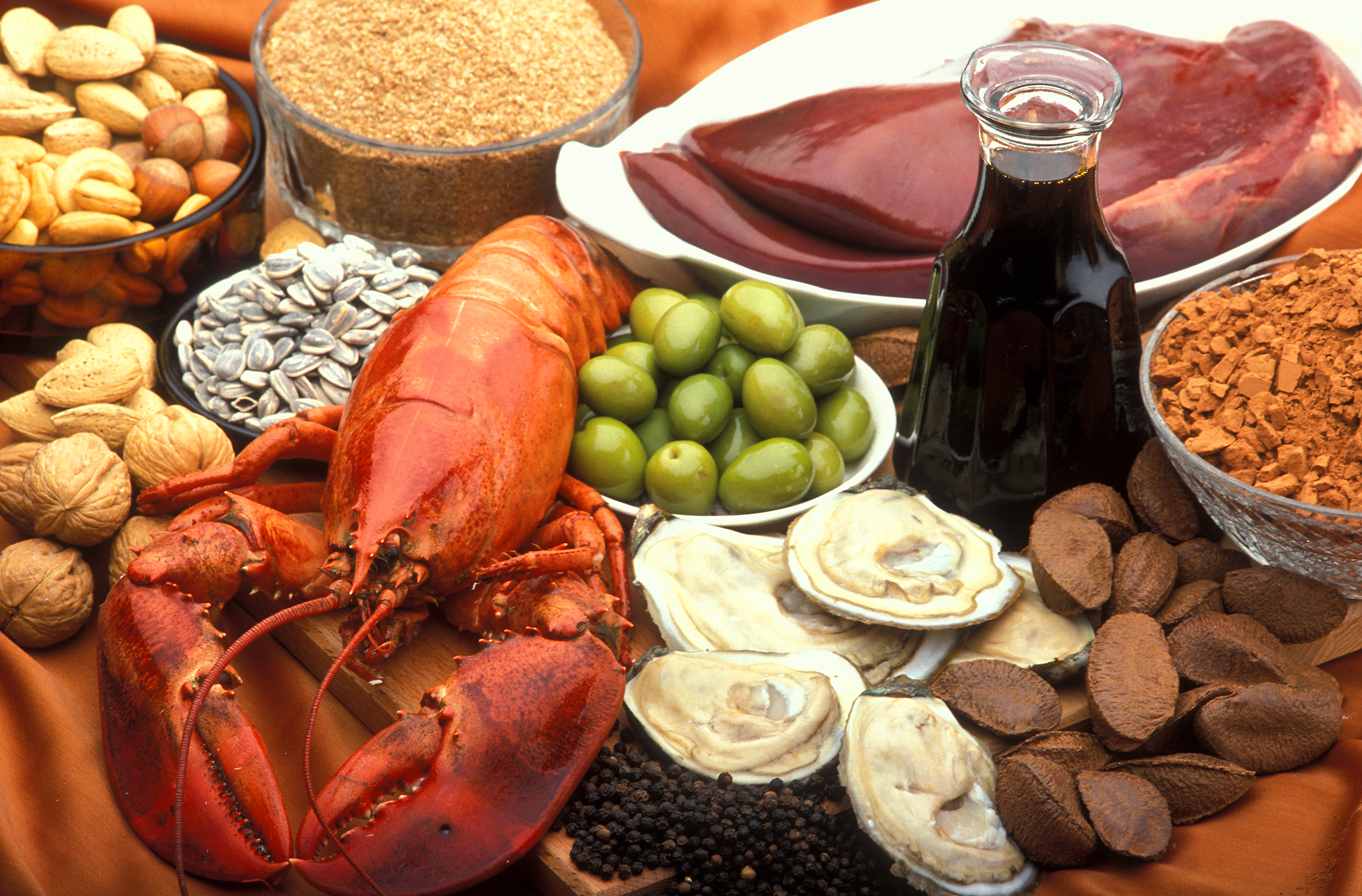
Rich sources of copper include oysters, beef and lamb liver, Brazil nuts, blackstrap molasses, cocoa, and black pepper. Good sources include lobster, nuts and sunflower seeds, green olives, avocados, and wheat bran.

Copper is an essential trace element in plants and animals, but not all microorganisms. The human body contains copper at a level of about 1.4 to 2.1 mg per kg of body mass.

==== Absorption and regulation ====
Copper is absorbed in the gut, then transported to the liver bound to albumin. After processing in the liver, copper is distributed to other tissues in a second phase, which involves the protein ceruloplasmin, carrying the majority of copper in blood. Ceruloplasmin also carries the copper that is excreted in milk, and is particularly well-absorbed as a copper source. Copper in the body normally undergoes enterohepatic circulation (about 5 mg a day, vs. about 1 mg per day absorbed in the diet and excreted from the body), and the body is able to excrete some excess copper, if needed, via bile, which carries some copper out of the liver that is not then reabsorbed by the intestine.

Copper levels and transport are tightly regulated processes. At least two copper-specific chaperones have been isolated.

==== Dietary recommendations ====
The U.S. Institute of Medicine updated the estimated average requirements (EARs) and recommended dietary allowances (RDAs) for copper in 2001. If there is not sufficient information to establish EARs and RDAs, an estimate designated Adequate Intake (AI) is used instead. The AIs for copper are: 200 μg of copper for 0–6-month-old males and females, and 220 μg of copper for 7–12-month-old males and females. For both sexes, the RDAs for copper are: 340 μg of copper for 1–3 years old, 440 μg of copper for 4–8 years old, 700 μg of copper for 9–13 years old, 890 μg of copper for 14–18 years old and 900 μg of copper for ages 19 years and older. For pregnancy, 1,000 μg. For lactation, 1,300 μg. As for safety, the Institute of Medicine also sets tolerable upper intake levels (ULs) for vitamins and minerals when evidence is sufficient. In the case of copper, the UL is set at 10 mg/day. Collectively the EARs, RDAs, AIs and ULs are referred to as Dietary Reference Intakes.

The European Food Safety Authority (EFSA) refers to the collective set of information as Dietary Reference Values, with Population Reference Intake (PRI) instead of RDA, and Average Requirement instead of EAR. AI and UL are defined the same as in the United States. For women and men ages 18 and older, the AIs are set at 1.3 and 1.6 mg/day, respectively. AIs for pregnancy and lactation is 1.5 mg/day. For children ages 1–17 years, the AIs increase with age from 0.7 to 1.3 mg/day. These AIs are higher than the U.S. RDAs. The European Food Safety Authority reviewed the same safety question and set its UL at 5 mg/day, which is half the U.S. value.

For U.S. food and dietary supplement labeling purposes, the amount in a serving is expressed as a percent of Daily Value (%DV). In 2019, 100% of the Daily Value was revised to 0.9 mg to bring it into agreement with the RDA.

==== Deficiency ====
Because of its role in facilitating iron uptake, copper deficiency can produce anemia-like symptoms, neutropenia, bone abnormalities, hypopigmentation, impaired growth, increased incidence of infections, osteoporosis, hyperthyroidism, and abnormalities in glucose and cholesterol metabolism. Conversely, Wilson's disease is genetic disease that causes an accumulation of copper in body tissues.

A minimum dietary value for healthy growth in European rabbits has been reported to be at least 3 ppm in the diet. However, higher concentrations of copper (100 ppm, 200 ppm, or 500 ppm) in the diet of rabbits may favorably influence feed conversion efficiency, growth rates, and carcass dressing percentages.

Severe deficiency can be found by testing for low plasma or serum copper levels, low ceruloplasmin, and low red blood cell superoxide dismutase levels; these are not sensitive to marginal copper status. The "cytochrome c oxidase activity of leucocytes and platelets" has been stated as another factor in deficiency, but the results have not been confirmed by replication.

=== Toxicity ===
Chronic copper toxicity does not normally occur in humans because of transport systems that regulate absorption and excretion. No retention of copper is expected to occur at the 5 mg/day level.

Research has shown a link between copper level regulation in the body and several neurological diseases, especially Alzheimer's disease. The studies suggest the issue is an age-related breakdown of internal regulation mechanism rather than an exposure toxicity.

Gram quantities of various copper salts have been taken in suicide attempts and produced acute copper toxicity in humans, resulting in irreversible liver failure. Autosomal recessive mutations in copper transport proteins also cause regulation failure, leading to Wilson's disease with copper accumulation, cirrhosis of the liver, and psychiatric symptoms.

=== Bioleaching ===
Bacteria have been used to extract copper in industrial scale bioleaching systems. Microbe solutions percolate through crushed ore converting insoluble copper sulfides to soluble copper sulfates; electrowinning extracts high purity copper from the resulting solution.

=== Human exposure ===
In the US, the Occupational Safety and Health Administration (OSHA) has designated a permissible exposure limit (PEL) for copper dust in the workplace as a time-weighted average (TWA) of 1 mg/m^{3} and 0.1mg/m^{3} for copper fumes The National Institute for Occupational Safety and Health (NIOSH) has set a recommended exposure limit (REL) of 1 mg/m^{3}, time-weighted average. The IDLH (immediately dangerous to life and health) value is 100 mg/m^{3}. Copper is a constituent of tobacco smoke.

== History ==
=== Prehistoric ===
==== Copper Age ====
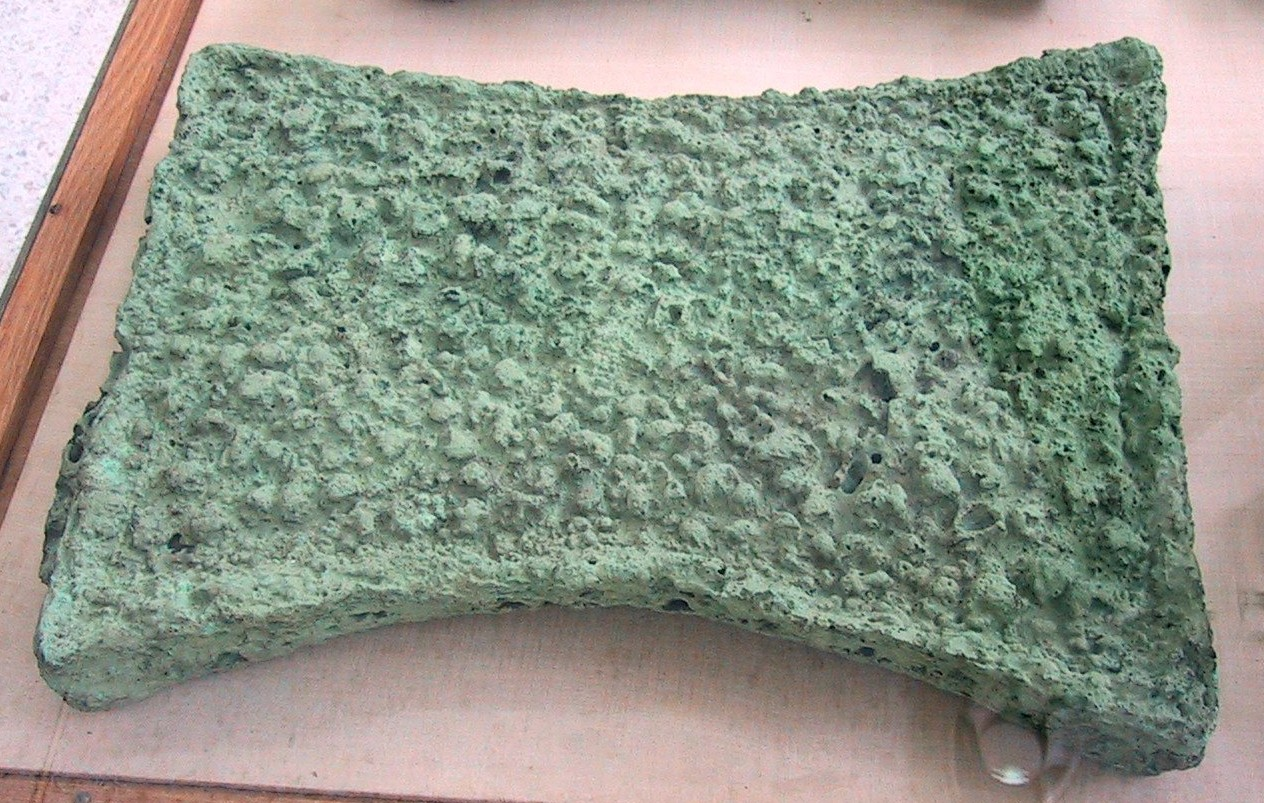
A corroded copper ingot from Zakros, Crete, shaped in the form of an animal skin (oxhide) typical in that era

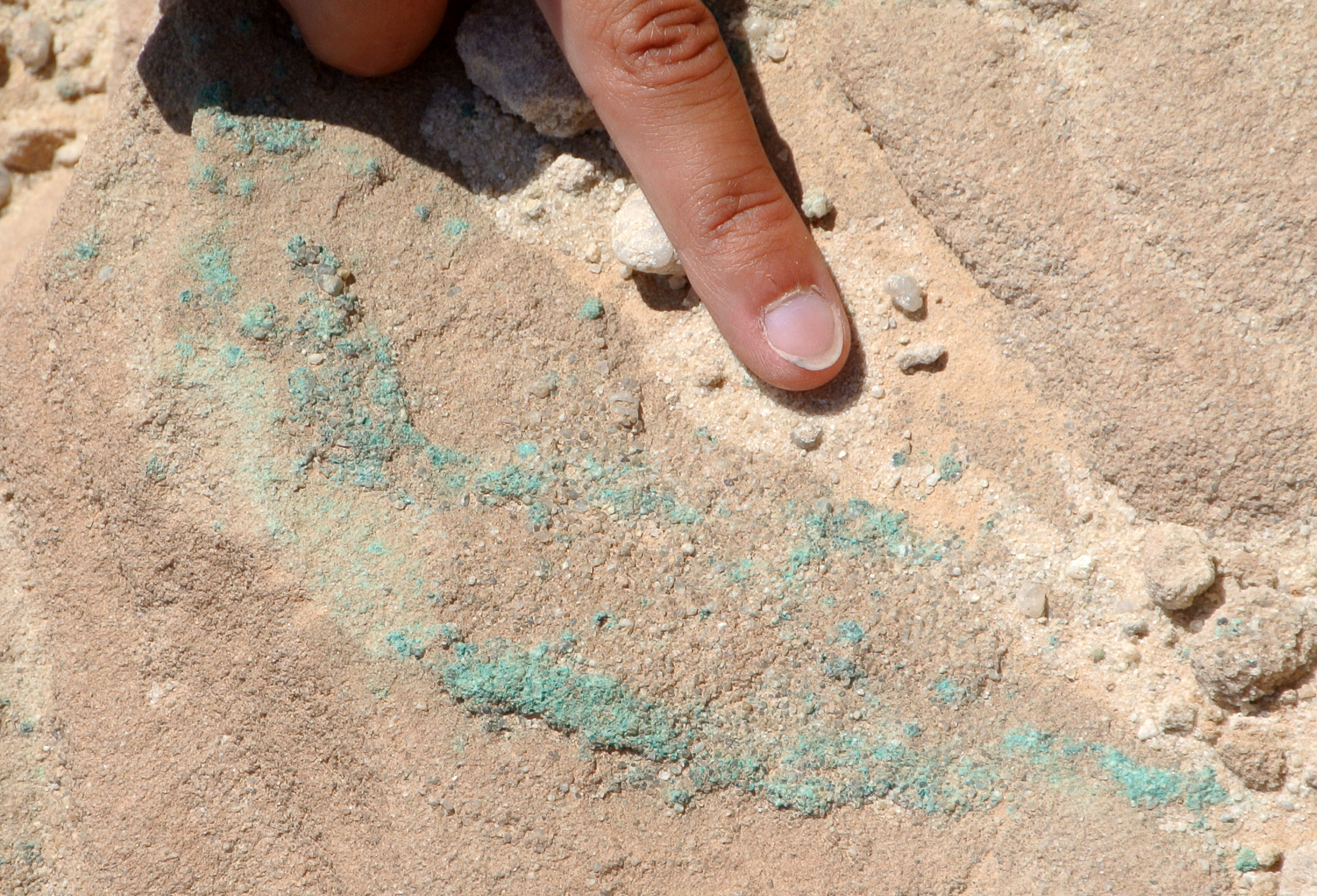
Copper ore (chrysocolla) in Cambrian sandstone from Chalcolithic mines in the Timna Valley, southern Israel

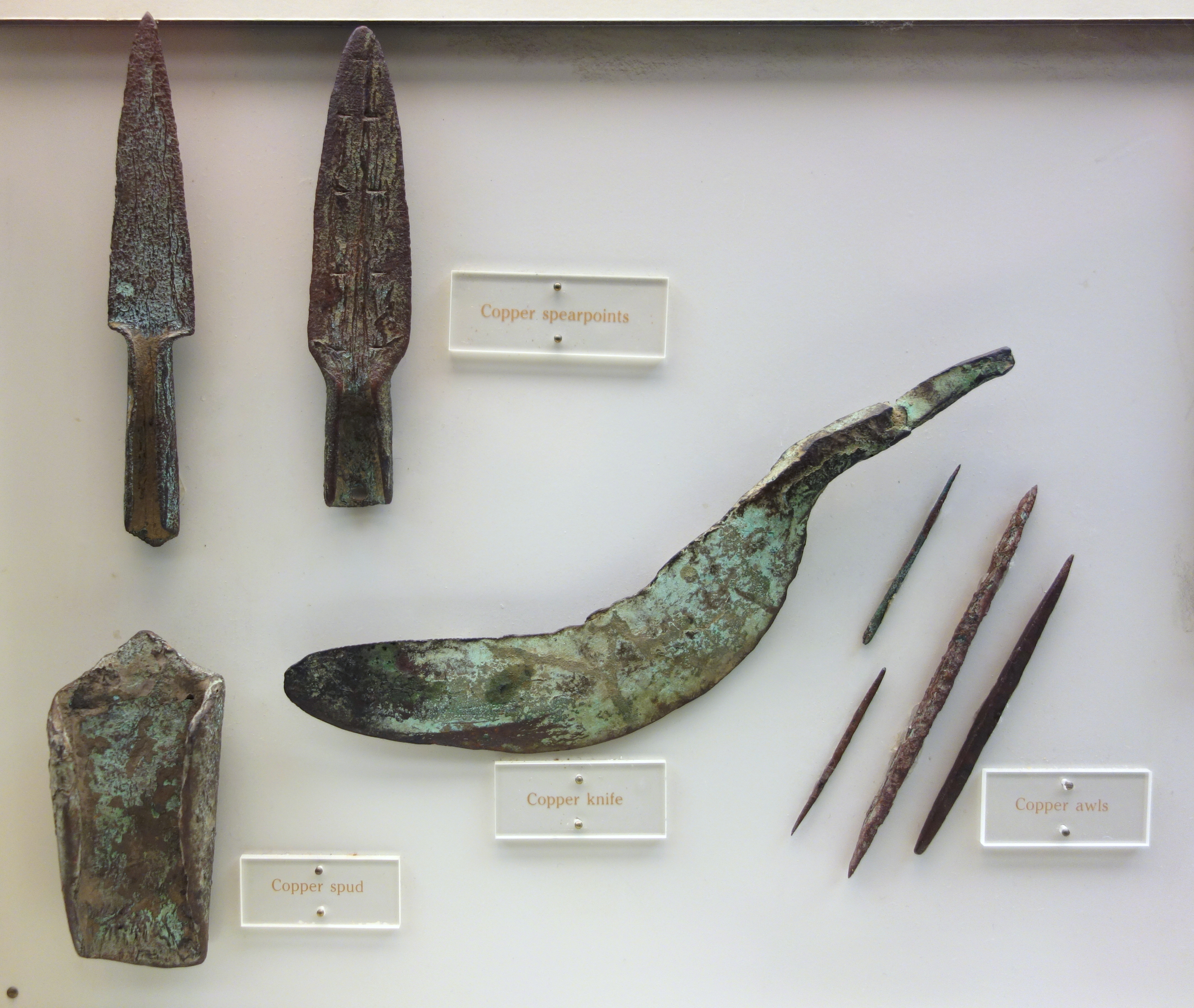
Copper artifacts from the Old Copper Complex of North America, ~9500–5400 years before present

Copper occurs naturally as native metallic copper and was known to some of the oldest civilizations on record. The history of native copper use dates to 9000 BC in the Middle East; a native copper pendant was found in northern Iraq that dates to 8700 BC. Evidence suggests that gold and native meteoric iron were the only metals used by humans before copper and hot metallurgy. The history of copper metallurgy is thought to follow this sequence: first came cold working of native copper, then annealing, followed by smelting, and finally casting.

The earliest archaeological support of hot metallurgy in Eurasia is found in the Balkans and Carpathian Mountains as evidenced by findings of copper objects made by metal casting and smelting dated to between 6200 and 5000 BC. The earliest example of lost-wax cast copper comes from an amulet found in Mehrgarh, Pakistan dated to 4000 BC. Ötzi the Iceman, a male dated from 3300 to 3200 BC discovered in the Central Eastern Alps, was found with a 99.7% pure copper axhead; high levels of arsenic in his hair suggest an involvement in copper smelting. Smelting was probably discovered in China before 2800 BC, in Central America around 600 AD, and in West Africa about the 9th or 10th century AD. Carbon dating has established copper mining at Alderley Edge in Cheshire, UK between 2280 and 1890 BC. Experience with copper assisted the development of other metals; specifically copper smelting likely led to the discovery of iron smelting.

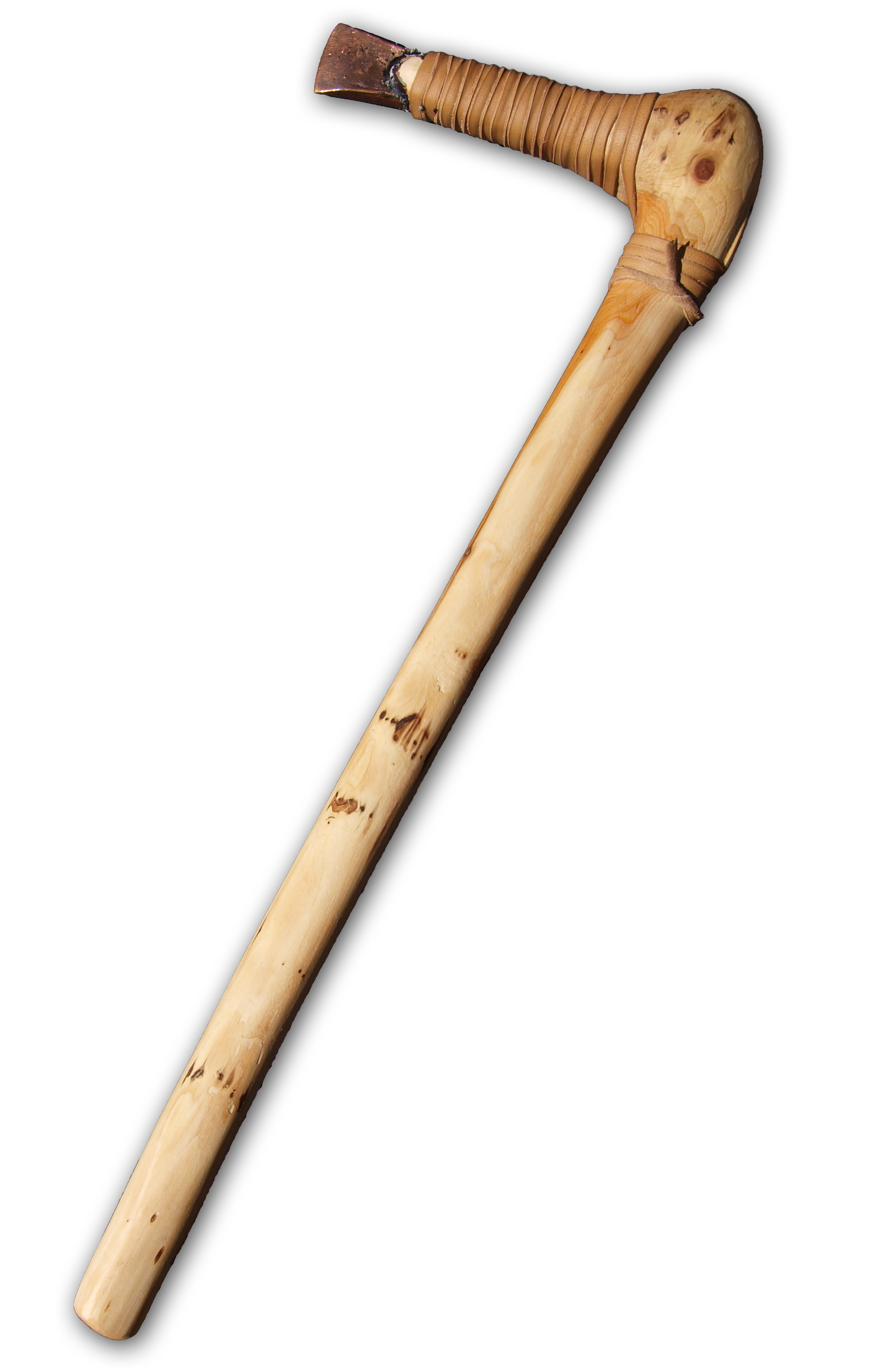
Replica of Ötzi's copper axe from the Chalcolithic Era

Production of non-smelted native copper in the Old Copper Complex in Michigan and Wisconsin is dated between 6500 and 3000 BC. A copper spearpoint found in Wisconsin has been dated to 6500 BC. Native Copper usage by the indigenous peoples of the Old Copper Complex from the Great Lakes region of North America has been radiometrically dated to as far back as 7500 BC. Indigenous peoples of North America around the Great Lakes may have found 99% pure native copper veins during this time, making it one of the oldest known examples of copper extraction in the world. There is evidence from prehistoric lead pollution from lakes in Michigan that people in the region began mining copper c. 6000 BC. Later evidence suggests that utilitarian copper objects fell increasingly out of use in the Old Copper Complex of North America and a shift towards an increased production of ornamental copper objects occurred.

==== Bronze Age ====
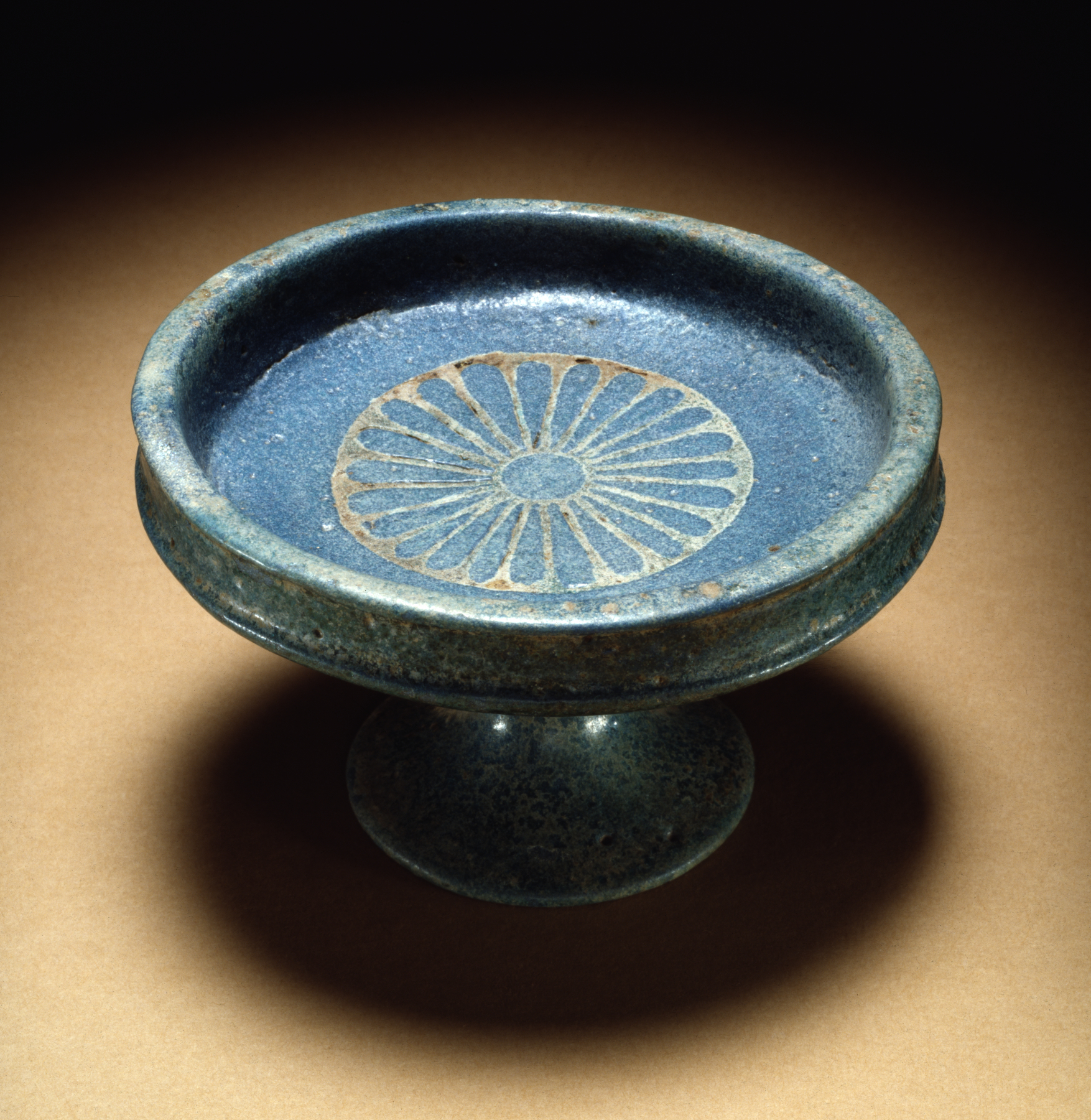
Copper was used in blue pigments like this "Egyptian blue" faience saucer and stand from the Bronze Age, New Kingdom of Egypt (1400–1325 BC).

Natural bronze, a type of copper made from ores rich in silicon, arsenic, and (rarely) tin, came into general use in the Balkans around 5500 BC. Alloying copper with tin to make bronze was first practiced about 4000 years after the discovery of copper smelting, and about 2000 years after "natural bronze" had come into general use. Bronze artifacts from the Vinča culture date to 4500 BC. Sumerian and Egyptian artifacts of copper and bronze alloys date to 3000 BC. Egyptian blue, or cuprorivaite (calcium copper silicate), is a synthetic pigment that contains copper and started being used in ancient Egypt around 3250 BC. The manufacturing process of Egyptian blue was known to the Romans, but by the fourth century AD the pigment fell out of use and the secret to its manufacturing process became lost. The Roman Vitruvius said in the first century BC that the blue pigment was made from copper minerals or bronze, lime, and a flux like natron, and this basic recipe has been confirmed in modern times.

The Bronze Age began in Southeastern Europe around 3700–3300 BC, in Northwestern Europe about 2500 BC. It ended with the beginning of the Iron Age, 2000–1000 BC in the Near East, and 600 BC in Northern Europe. The transition between the Neolithic period and the Bronze Age was formerly termed the Chalcolithic period (copper-stone), when copper tools were used with stone tools. The term has gradually fallen out of favor because in some parts of the world, the Chalcolithic and Neolithic are coterminous at both ends. Brass, an alloy of copper and zinc, is of much more recent origin. It was known to the Greeks, but became a significant supplement to bronze during the Roman Empire.

=== Ancient and post-classical ===
In alchemy the symbol for copper was also the symbol for the goddess and planet Venus.

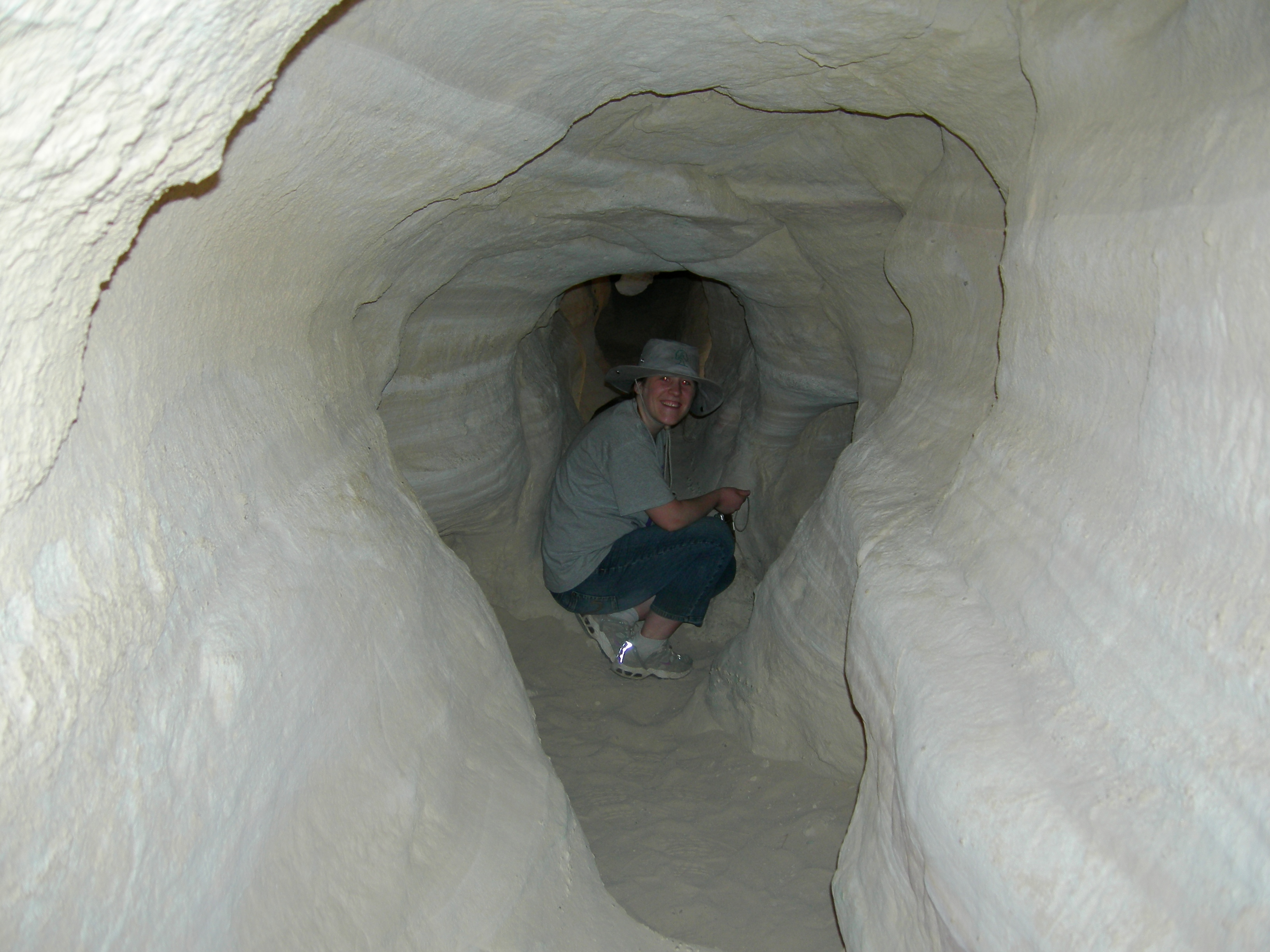
Chalcolithic copper mine in Timna Valley, Negev Desert, Israel

In Greece, copper was known by the name chalkos (χαλκός). It was an important resource for the Romans, Greeks and other ancient peoples. In Roman times, it was known as aes Cyprium, aes being the generic Latin term for copper alloys and Cyprium from Cyprus, where much copper was mined. The phrase was simplified to cuprum, hence the English copper. Aphrodite (Venus in Rome) represented copper in mythology and alchemy because of its lustrous beauty and its ancient use in producing mirrors; Cyprus, the source of copper, was sacred to the goddess. The seven heavenly bodies known to the ancients were associated with the seven metals known in antiquity, and Venus was assigned to copper, both because of the connection to the goddess and because Venus was the brightest heavenly body after the Sun and Moon and so corresponded to the most lustrous and desirable metal after gold and silver.

Copper was the most extensively used metal among natives of North America, with evidence for use going back 7000 years. Native copper is known to have been extracted from sites on Isle Royale with primitive stone tools between 800 and 1600 AD. Copper, probably from pure nuggets found in the Great Lakes area, was worked by repeated hammering and annealing in the North American city of Cahokia (near modern-day Missouri) around 1000–1300 AD. There are several exquisite copper plates, known as the Mississippian copper plates, that have been found in North America in the area around Cahokia, dating from this time period (1000–1300 AD).

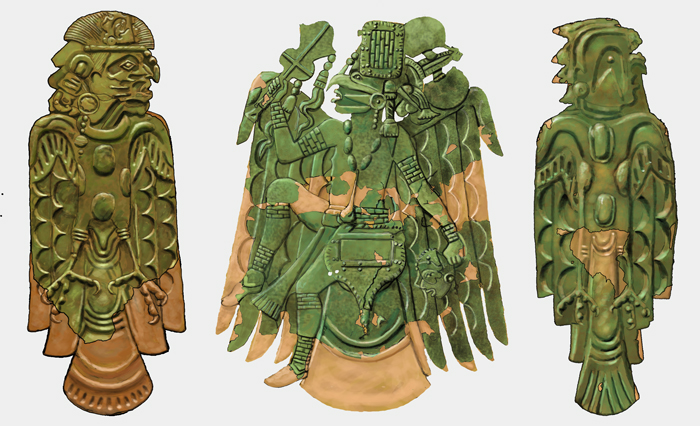
Mississippian copper plates from North America were produced in this style from around 800 to 1600 AD.

In South America, a copper mask dated to 1000 BC found in the Argentinian Andes is the oldest known copper artifact discovered in the Andes. Peru has been considered the origin for early copper metallurgy in pre-Columbian America, but the copper mask from Argentina suggests that the Cajón del Maipo of the southern Andes was another important center for early copper workings in South America. Copper metallurgy in Peru dates to around 500 BC, with larger scale production beginning around 900 AD as part of the rise of the Sican culture in northern Peru. The production continued through a series of conquests by the Chimor and Inca cultures, ending with the Spanish conquest in 1532.

In Sub-Saharan Africa, throughout the period from the first mines around 2000 BC in Agades until the early 1800s, copper was viewed as more precious and prestigious than either gold or silver. Copper was widely traded in Africa and fulfilled a number of religious, political, and social functions. By contrast, local deposit of gold were ignored until contact with Portuguese and Arab traders.

The cultural role of copper has been important, particularly in currency. Romans in the 6th through 3rd centuries BC used copper lumps as money. At first, the copper itself was valued, but gradually the shape and look of the copper became more important. Julius Caesar had his own coins made from brass, while Octavianus Augustus Caesar's coins were made from Cu-Pb-Sn alloys. With an estimated annual output of around 15,000 t, Roman copper mining and smelting activities reached a scale unsurpassed until the time of the Industrial Revolution; the provinces most intensely mined were those of Hispania, Cyprus and in Central Europe.

The gates of the Temple of Jerusalem used Corinthian bronze, a copper, silver, and gold alloy treated with depletion gilding, which successively removes oxidized copper to create a gold surface coat. The process was most prevalent in Alexandria, where alchemy, inspired by the chemical treatment resulting in gold appearance, is thought to have begun.

=== Modern ===
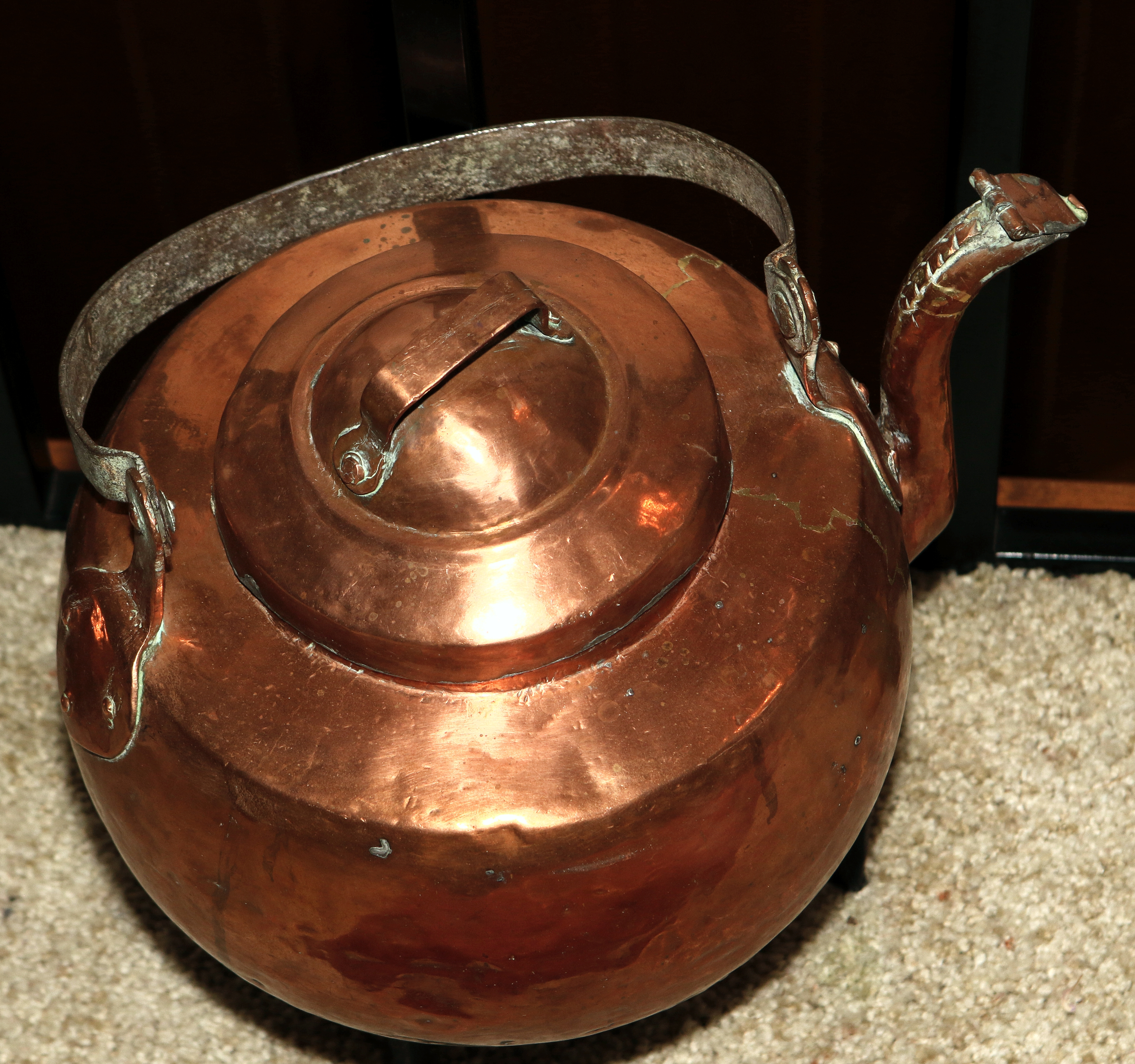
18th-century copper kettle from Norway made from Swedish copper

The Great Copper Mountain was a mine in Falun, Sweden, that operated from the 10th century to 1992. It satisfied two-thirds of Europe's copper consumption in the 17th century and helped fund many of Sweden's wars during that time. It was referred to as the nation's treasury; Sweden had a copper backed currency.

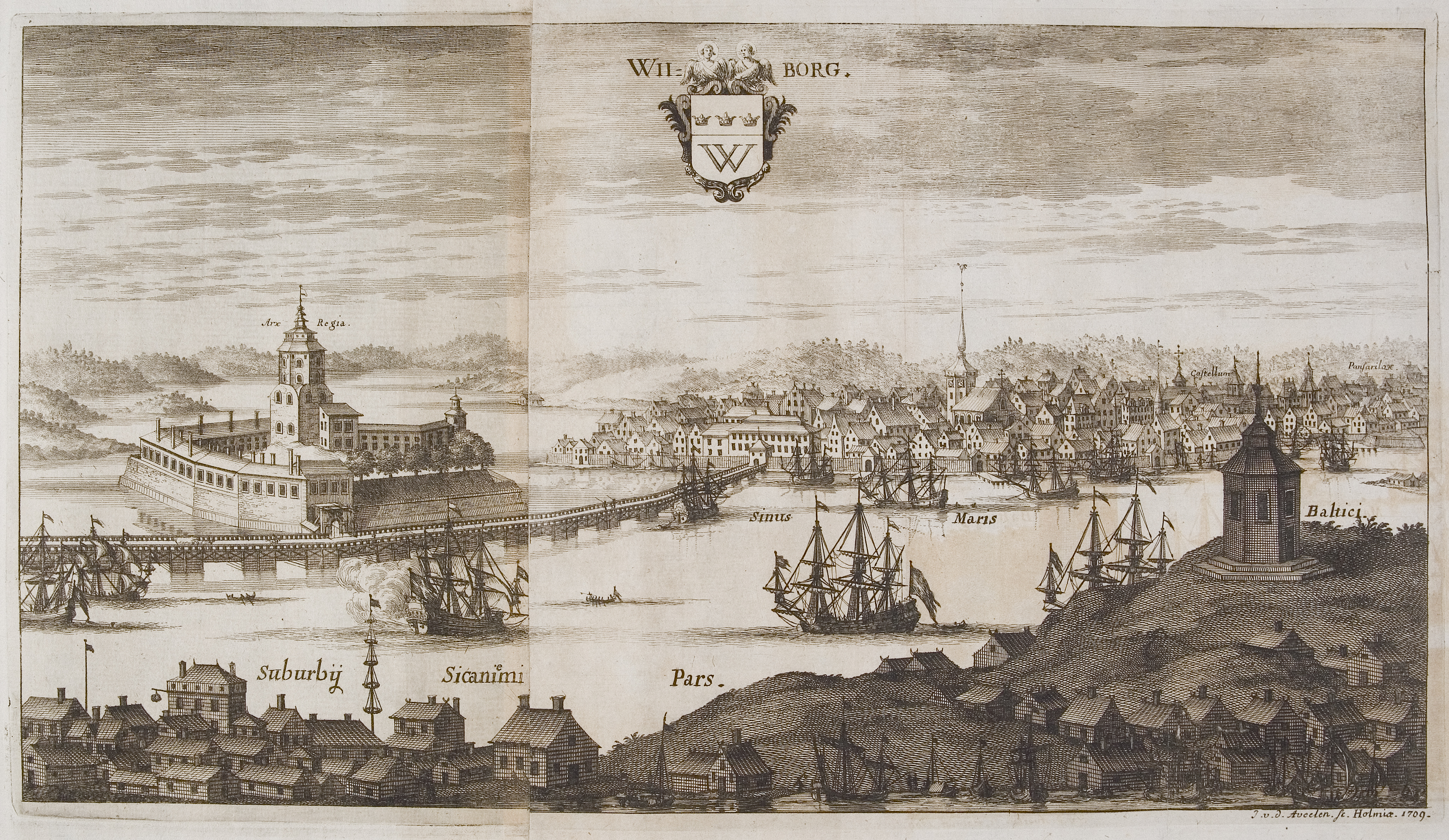
Chalcography of the city of Vyborg at the turn of the 17th and 18th centuries. The year 1709 carved on the printing plate.

Copper is used in roofing, currency, and for photographic technology known as the daguerreotype. Copper was used in Renaissance sculpture, and was used to construct the Statue of Liberty; copper continues to be used in construction of various types. Copper plating and copper sheathing were widely used to protect the under-water hulls of ships, a technique pioneered by the British Admiralty in the 18th century. The Norddeutsche Affinerie in Hamburg was the first modern electroplating plant, starting its production in 1876.

During the rise in demand for copper for the Age of Electricity, from the 1880s until the Great Depression of the 1930s, the United States produced one third to half the world's newly mined copper. Major districts included the Keweenaw district of northern Michigan, primarily native copper deposits, which was eclipsed by the vast sulphide deposits of Butte, Montana, in the late 1880s, which itself was eclipsed by porphyry deposits of the Southwest United States, especially at Bingham Canyon, Utah, and Morenci, Arizona. Introduction of open pit steam shovel mining and innovations in smelting, refining, flotation concentration and other processing steps led to mass production. Early in the twentieth century, Arizona ranked first, followed by Montana, then Utah and Michigan.

Flash smelting was developed by Outokumpu in Finland and first applied at Harjavalta in 1949; the energy-efficient process accounts for 50% of the world's primary copper production.

The Intergovernmental Council of Copper Exporting Countries, formed in 1967 by Chile, Peru, Zaire, and Zambia, operated in the copper market as OPEC does in oil, though it never achieved the same influence, particularly because the second-largest producer, the United States, was never a member; it was dissolved in 1988. In 2008, China became the world's largest importer of copper.

== Applications ==
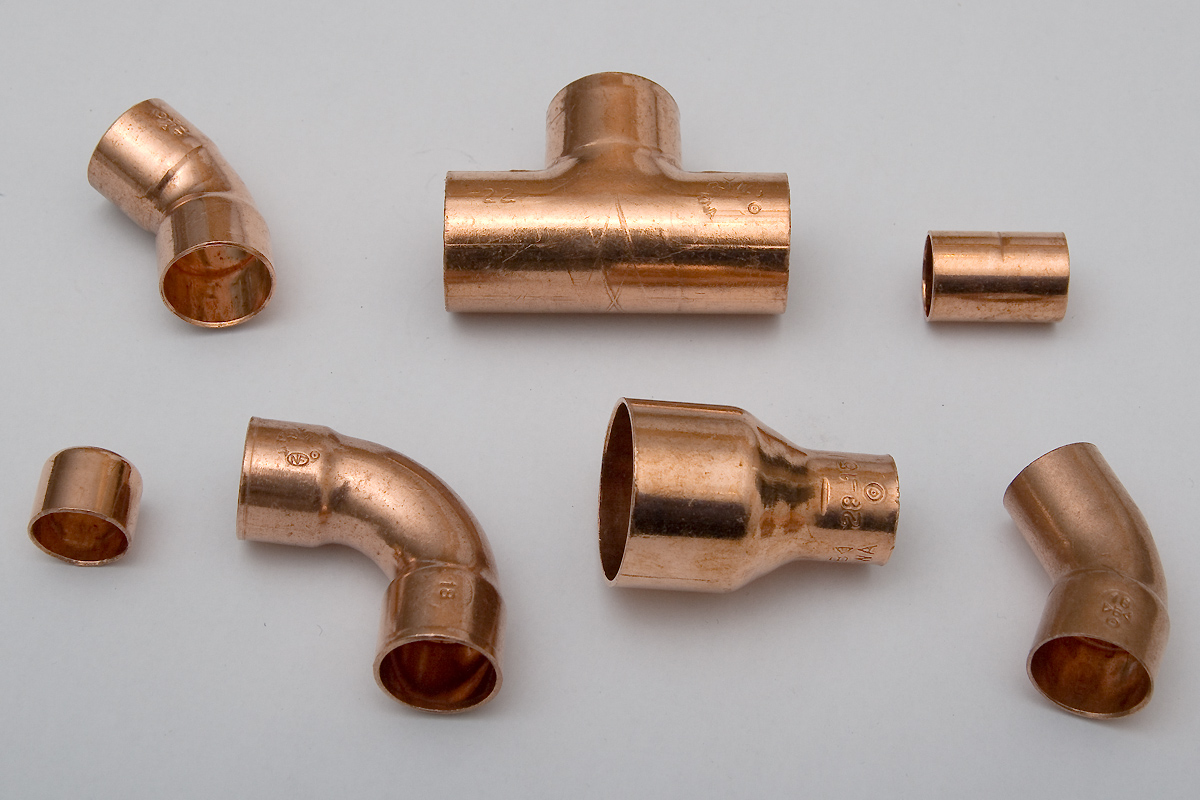
Copper fittings for soldered plumbing joints

The major applications of copper are electrical wire (60%), roofing and plumbing (20%), and industrial machinery (15%). Copper is used mostly as a pure metal, but when greater hardness is required, it is put into such alloys as brass and bronze (5% of total use). For more than two centuries, copper paint has been used on boat hulls to control the growth of plants and shellfish. A small part of the copper supply is used for nutritional supplements and fungicides in agriculture. Pure copper's ductility, weakness and high friction between copper chips and cutting tools makes machining of copper difficult; alloys are preferred for good machinability. Copper cookware can react with acidic or alkaline foods, leaving a metallic taste, but is useful for whipping egg-whites.

=== Wire and cable ===
Despite competition from other materials, copper remains the preferred electrical conductor in nearly all categories of electrical wiring except overhead electric power transmission where aluminium is often preferred. Copper wire is used in power generation, power transmission, electric power distribution, telecommunications, electronics circuitry, and countless types of electrical equipment. Electrical wiring is the most important market for the copper industry. This includes structural power wiring, power distribution cable, appliance wire, communications cable, automotive wire and cable, and magnet wire. Roughly half of all copper mined is used for electrical wire and cable conductors. Many electrical devices rely on copper wiring because of its multitude of beneficial properties, such as its high electrical conductivity, tensile strength, ductility, creep (deformation) resistance, corrosion resistance, low thermal expansion, high thermal conductivity, ease of soldering, and ease of installation.

For a short period from the late 1960s to the late 1970s, copper wiring was replaced by aluminium wiring in many housing construction projects in America but improper design resulted in fire hazards. The safety issues have since been solved by use of larger sizes of aluminium wire (#8AWG and up), and properly designed aluminium wiring is still being installed in place of copper. For example, the Airbus A380 uses aluminum wire in place of copper wire for electrical power transmission.

=== Electronics and related devices ===
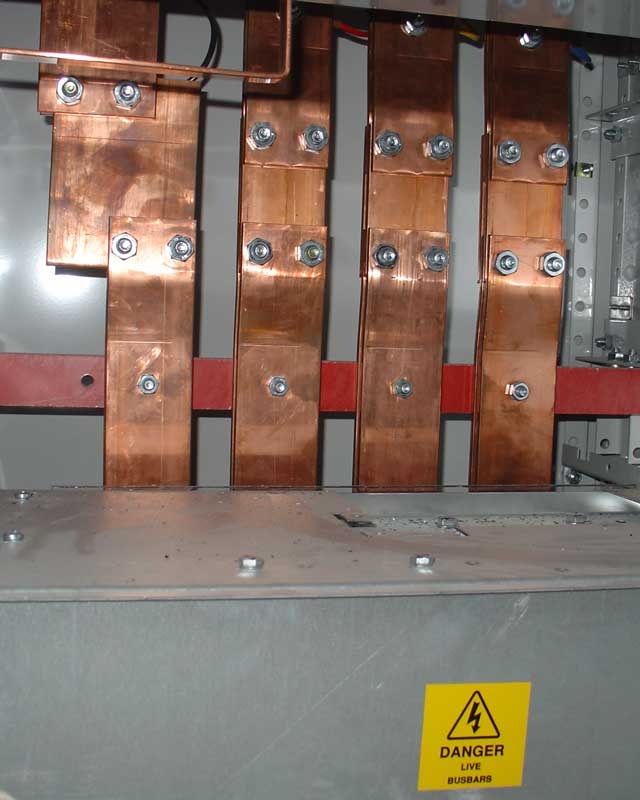
Copper electrical busbars distributing power to a large building

Integrated circuits and printed circuit boards increasingly feature copper in place of aluminium because of its superior electrical conductivity; heat sinks and heat exchangers use copper because of its superior heat dissipation properties. Electromagnets, vacuum tubes, cathode-ray tubes, and magnetrons in microwave ovens use copper, as do waveguides for microwave radiation.

=== Electric motors ===
Copper's superior conductivity enhances the efficiency of electrical motors. This is important because motors and motor-driven systems account for 43–46% of all global electricity consumption and 69% of all electricity used by industry. Increasing the mass and cross section of copper in a coil increases the efficiency of the motor. Copper motor rotors, a new technology designed for motor applications where energy savings are prime design objectives, are enabling general-purpose induction motors to meet and exceed National Electrical Manufacturers Association (NEMA) premium efficiency standards.

=== Architecture ===
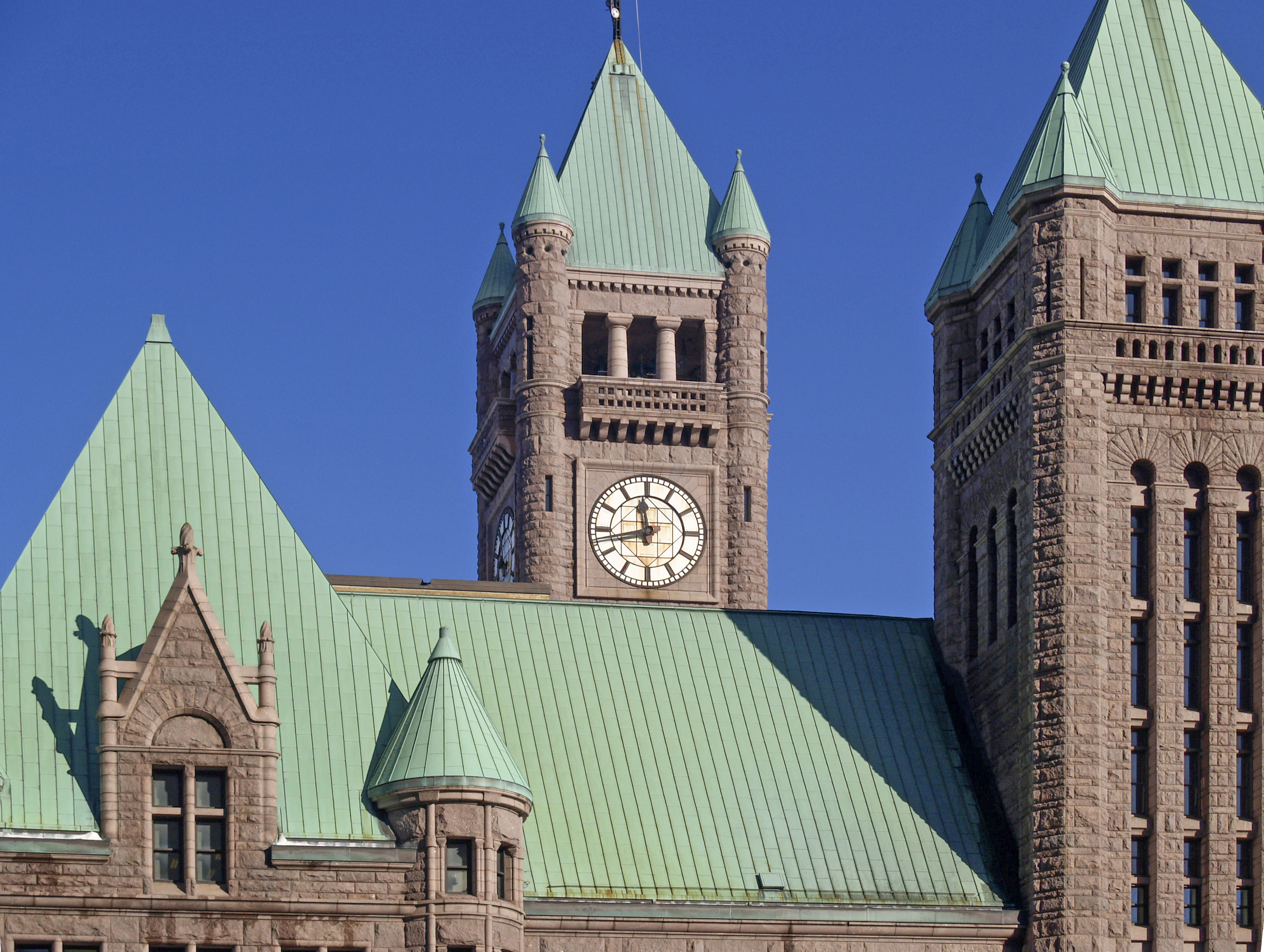
Copper roof on the Minneapolis City Hall, coated with patina

Copper has been used since ancient times as a durable, corrosion resistant, and weatherproof architectural material. Roofs, flashings, rain gutters, downspouts, domes, spires, vaults, and doors have been made from copper for hundreds or thousands of years. Copper's architectural use has been expanded in modern times to include interior and exterior wall cladding, building expansion joints, radio frequency shielding, and antimicrobial and decorative indoor products such as attractive handrails, bathroom fixtures, and counter tops. Some of copper's other important benefits as an architectural material include low thermal movement, light weight, lightning protection, and recyclability.

The metal's distinctive natural green patina has long been coveted by architects and designers. The final patina is a particularly durable layer that is highly resistant to atmospheric corrosion, thereby protecting the underlying metal against further weathering. It can be a mixture of carbonate and sulfate compounds in various amounts, depending upon environmental conditions such as sulfur-containing acid rain. Architectural copper and its alloys can also be 'finished' to take on a particular look, feel, or color. Finishes include mechanical surface treatments, chemical coloring, and coatings.

Copper has excellent brazing and soldering properties and can be welded; the best results are obtained with gas metal arc welding.

=== Antibiofouling ===
Copper is biostatic, meaning bacteria and many other forms of life will not grow on it. For this reason it has long been used to line parts of ships to protect against barnacles and mussels. It was originally used pure, but has since been superseded by Muntz metal and copper-based paint. Similarly, as discussed in copper alloys in aquaculture, copper alloys have become important netting materials in the aquaculture industry because they are antimicrobial and prevent biofouling, even in extreme conditions, and have strong structural and corrosion-resistant properties in marine environments.

=== Antimicrobial ===
Copper-alloy touch surfaces have natural properties that destroy a wide range of microorganisms (e.g., E. coli O157:H7, methicillin-resistant Staphylococcus aureus (MRSA), Staphylococcus, Clostridium difficile, influenza A virus, adenovirus, SARS-CoV-2, and fungi). Some copper alloys were proven to kill more than 99.9% of disease-causing bacteria within just two hours when cleaned regularly. The United States Environmental Protection Agency (EPA) has approved the registrations of these copper alloys as "antimicrobial materials with public health benefits"; that approval allows manufacturers to make legal claims to the public health benefits of products made of registered alloys. In addition, the EPA has approved a long list of antimicrobial copper products made from these alloys, such as bedrails, handrails, over-bed tables, sinks, faucets, door knobs, toilet hardware, computer keyboards, health club equipment, and shopping cart handles. Copper doorknobs are used by hospitals to minimize the transfer of disease, and Legionnaires' disease is suppressed by copper tubing in plumbing systems. Antimicrobial copper alloy products are now being installed in healthcare facilities in the UK, Ireland, Japan, Korea, France, Denmark, and Brazil, and in the subway transit system in Santiago, Chile, where copper–zinc alloy handrails were installed in some 30 stations between 2011 and 2014. Copper surfaces in healthcare have been advocated for in the US, as well. Textile fibers can be blended with copper to create antimicrobial protective fabrics.

=== Fungicide ===
Copper is widely used as a wood preservative primarily because it is an effective fungicide against soft rot fungi while avoiding the significant environmental impact of chromium and arsenic based preservatives.

=== Folk medicine ===
Copper is commonly used in jewelry, and according to some folklore, copper bracelets relieve arthritis symptoms. In one trial for osteoarthritis and one trial for rheumatoid arthritis, no differences were found between copper bracelet and control (non-copper) bracelet. No evidence shows that copper can be absorbed through the skin.

== See also ==
- Copper in renewable energy
- Copper nanoparticle
- Erosion corrosion of copper water tubes
  - Cold water pitting of copper tube
- List of countries by copper production
- Metal theft
  - Operation Tremor
- Anaconda Copper
- Antofagasta PLC
- Codelco
- El Boleo mine
- Grasberg mine
- Copper foil

== Notes ==
Pourbaix diagrams for copper
in pure water, or acidic or alkali conditions. Copper in neutral water is more noble than hydrogen.	in water containing sulfide	in 10 M ammonia solution	in a chloride solution
