= Alkali metal cuprates(III) =

Family of copper salts

In inorganic chemistry, alkali metal cuprates(III) refers to a family of copper salts of the form MCuO_{2}, where M is an alkali metal. They are cuprate salts and coordination polymers. Their primary interest is as simple models of the polymeric cuprate(III) sheet anion, notionally CuO^{−}_{2}, which also appears in cuprate superconductors.

== General properties ==
Cuprates(III) are very strong oxidants. They are unstable in water, typically oxidizing the medium.

== Potassium cuprate ==
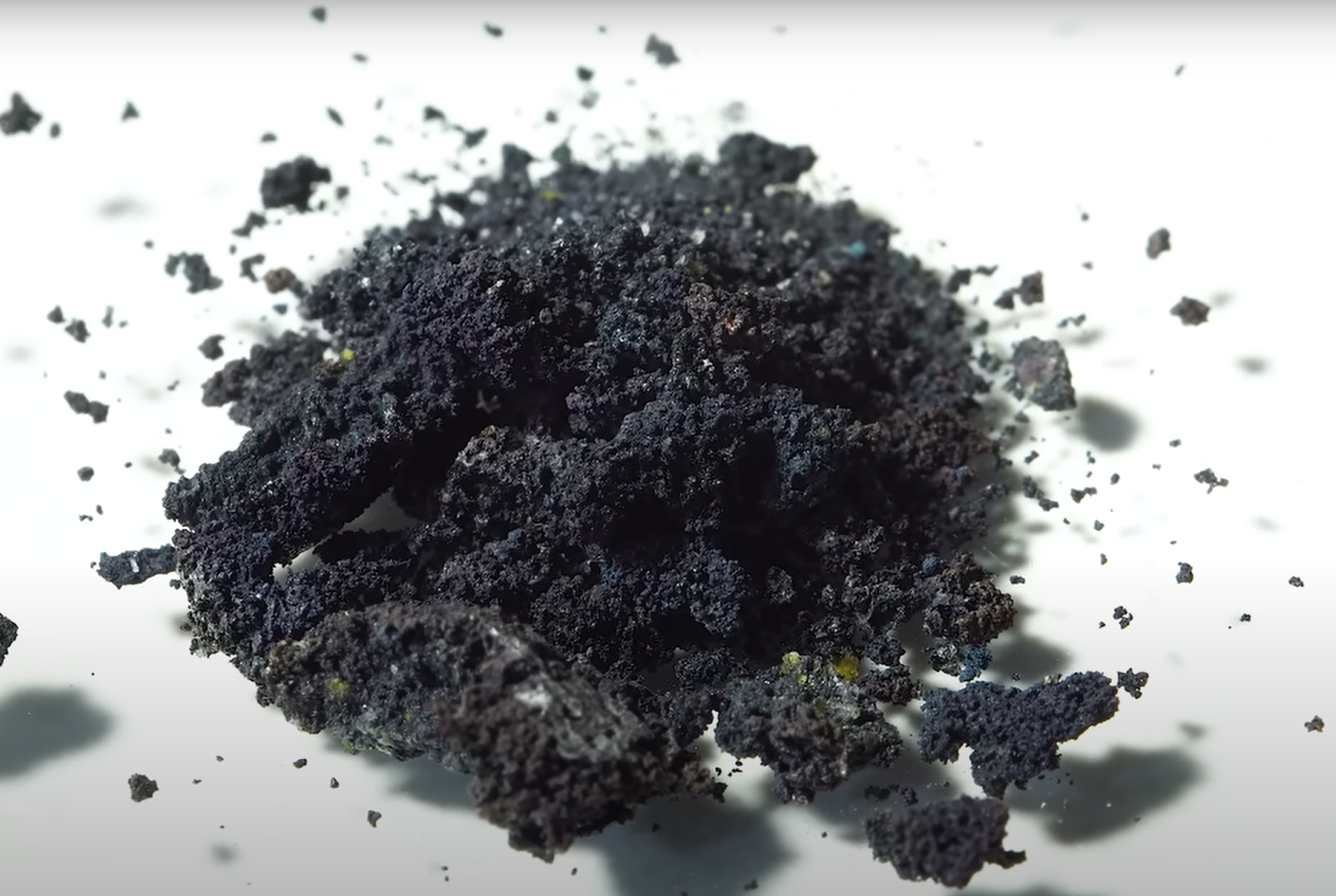
Potassium cuprate

One of the simplest oxide-based cuprates is potassium cuprate(III) KCuO_{2}. This species can be viewed as the K^{+} salt of the polyanion [CuO^{−}_{2}]_{n}. As such the material is classified as an oxide cuprate. This dark blue diamagnetic solid is produced by heating potassium peroxide and copper(II) oxide in an atmosphere of oxygen:

K_{2}O_{2} + 2 CuO → 2 KCuO_{2}

KCuO_{2} was discovered first in 1952 by V. K. Wahl and W. Klemm, they synthesized this compound by heating copper(II) oxide and potassium superoxide in an atmosphere of oxygen.

2 KO_{2} + 2 CuO → 2 KCuO_{2} + O_{2}

It can also be synthesized by heating potassium superoxide and copper powder:

KO_{2} + Cu → KCuO_{2}

KCuO_{2} reacts with the air fairly slowly. It starts to decompose at 760 K (487 °C; 908 °F) and its color changes from blue to pale green at 975 K (702 °C; 1,295 °F). Its melting point is 1,025 K (752 °C; 1,385 °F).

In fact, KCuO_{2} is a non-stoichiometric compound, so the more exact formula is KCuO_{x} and x is very close to 2. This causes the formation of defects in the crystal structure, and this leads to the tendency of this compound to be reduced.

== Sodium cuprate ==
Sodium cuprate(III) NaCuO_{2} can be produced by using hypochlorites or hypobromites to oxidize copper hydroxide under alkaline and low temperature conditions.

2 NaOH + CuSO_{4} → Cu(OH)_{2}↓
2 Cu(OH)_{2} + 2 NaOH + NaClO → 2 NaCuO_{2} + NaCl + 3 H_{2}O

Sodium cuprate(III) is reddish-brown, but turns black gradually as it decomposes to copper(II) oxide. In order to prevent decomposition, it must be prepared at low temperature in the absence of light.

== Other cuprates ==
Other cuprates(III) of alkali metals are known; the structures of KCuO_{2} (potassium cuprate(III)), RbCuO_{2} (rubidium cuprate(III)) and CsCuO_{2} (caesium cuprate(III)) have been determined as well.

RbCuO_{2} (blue-black) and CsCuO_{2} (black) can be prepared by reaction of rubidium oxide and caesium oxide with copper(II) oxide powders, at 675 K (402 °C; 755 °F) and 655 K (382 °C; 719 °F) in oxygen atmosphere, respectively. They both reacts with air rapidly, unlike KCuO_{2}.

4 CuO^{−}_{2} + 2 H_{2}O → 4 CuO + O_{2} + 4 OH^{−}
