= Cuprate =

Metallic compound with anionic copper complexes

Cuprates are a class of compounds that contain copper (Cu) atom(s) in an anion. The term 'cuprate' itself originates from 'cuprum', the Latin word for copper. Cuprates appear mainly in three contexts: anionic organocopper species; inorganic, anionic coordination complexes; and complex oxides.

Organic cuprates typically have a CuR_{2}^{−} formula, corresponding to a copper(I) oxidation state, where at least one of the R groups can be any organic group. These compounds are frequently used in organic synthesis as weak nucleophiles that preferentially attack π bonds. An example of an organic cuprate is dimethylcuprate(I) anion [Cu(CH_{3})_{2}]^{−}.

Inorganic cuprate complexes have a wide variety of formulas. An inorganic cuprate example is the tetrachloridocuprate(II) or tetrachlorocuprate(II) (CuCl_{4}^{2−}) anion, a copper(II) atom coordinated to four chloride ions.

Cuprate oxide salts are layered materials with general formula XYCu_{m}O_{n}, and some are non-stoichiometric. Many of these compounds are known for their superconducting properties.

== Oxide cuprates ==
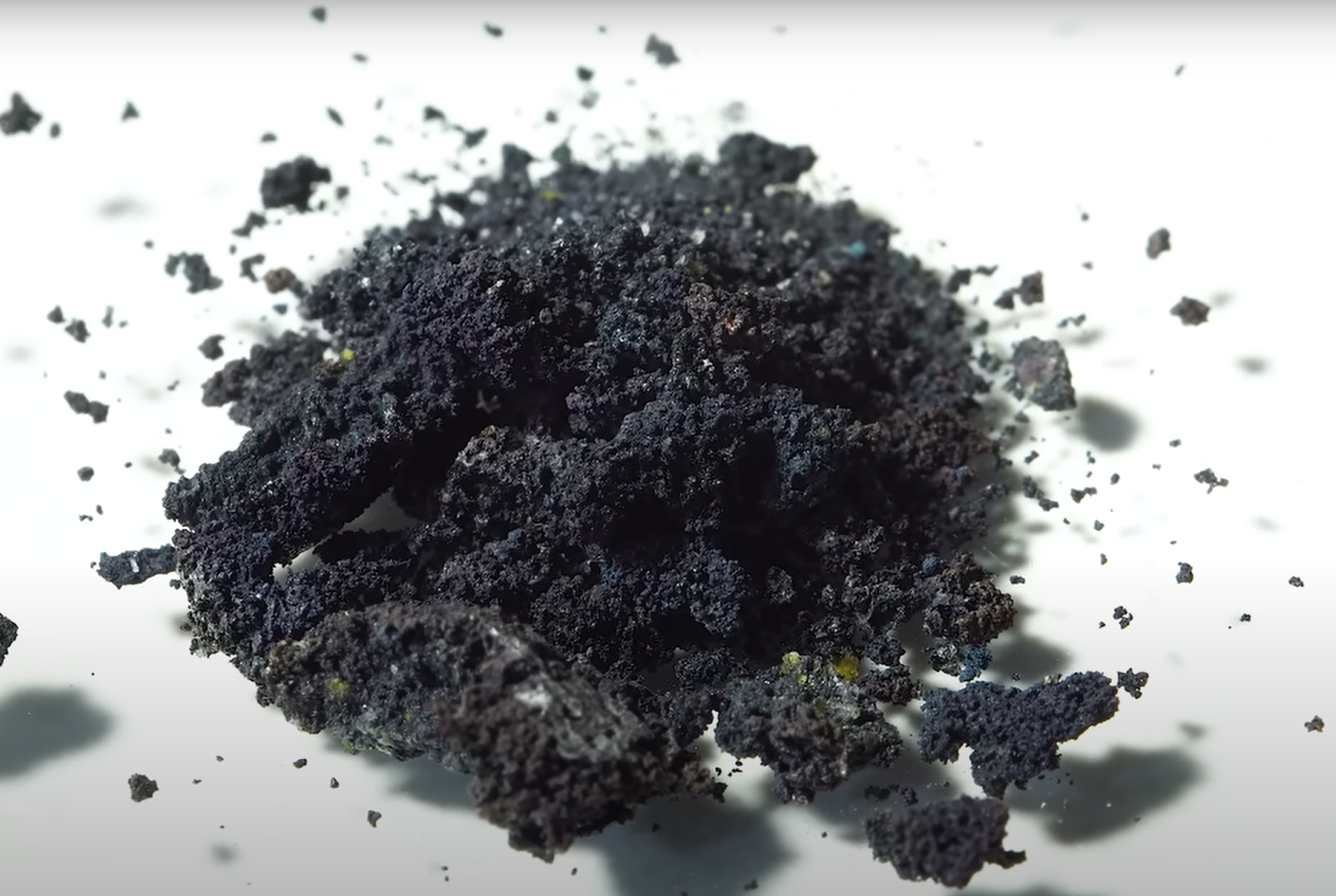
Potassium cuprate

Many stable or metastable alkali metal cuprates(III) are known, all salts of the polyanion [CuO_{2}^{−}]_{n}. They are strong oxidants, oxidizing water. They are typically produced through extremely large oxygen activities. Alkali metals larger than sodium produce dark-blue salts, but sodium cuprate(III) is red-brown.

One of the simplest oxide-based cuprates is potassium cuprate(III) KCuO_{2}. Even so, KCuO_{2} is a non-stoichiometric compound, so the more exact formula is KCuO_{x} and x is very close to 2. This causes the formation of defects in the crystal structure, and this leads to the tendency of this compound to be reduced.

One of the most studied inorganic cuprates is YBa_{2}Cu_{3}O_{7}, also known as YBCO. This oxide cuprate has been the subject of extensive research due to its ability to conduct electricity without resistance at relatively high temperatures. It is the parent of a family of cuprate superconductors.

== Coordination complexes ==
Copper forms many anionic coordination complexes with negatively charged ligands such as cyanide, hydroxide, and halides, as well as alkyls and aryls (see § Organic cuprates).

=== Copper(I) ===
Cuprates containing copper(I) tend to be colorless, reflecting their d^{10} configuration. Structures range from linear 2-coordinate to trigonal planar and tetrahedral molecular geometry. Examples include linear CuCl_{2}^{−} and trigonal planar CuCl_{3}^{2−}. Cyanide gives analogous complexes but also the trianionic tetracyanocuprate(I), [Cu(CN)_{4}]^{3−}. Dicyanocuprate(I), [Cu(CN)_{2}]^{−}, exists in both molecular or polymeric motifs, depending on the countercation.

=== Copper(II) ===
Caesium salt of hexafluorocuprate(IV)

Cuprates containing copper(II) include trichlorocuprate(II), CuCl_{3}^{−}, which is dimeric, and square-planar tetrachlorocuprate(II), CuCl_{4}^{2−}, and pentachlorocuprate(II), CuCl_{5}^{3−}. 3-Coordinate chlorocuprate(II) complexes are rare.

Tetrachlorocuprate(II) complexes tend to adopt flattened tetrahedral geometry with orange colors.

Sodium tetrahydroxycuprate(II) (Na_{2}Cu(OH)_{4}) is an example of a homoleptic (all ligands being the same) hydroxide complex.

Cu(OH)_{2} + 2 NaOH → Na_{2}Cu(OH)_{4}

=== Copper(III) and copper(IV) ===
Hexafluorocuprate(III) CuF_{6}^{3−} and hexafluorocuprate(IV) CuF_{6}^{2−} are rare examples of copper(III) and copper(IV) complexes. They are strong oxidizing agents.

== Organic cuprates ==
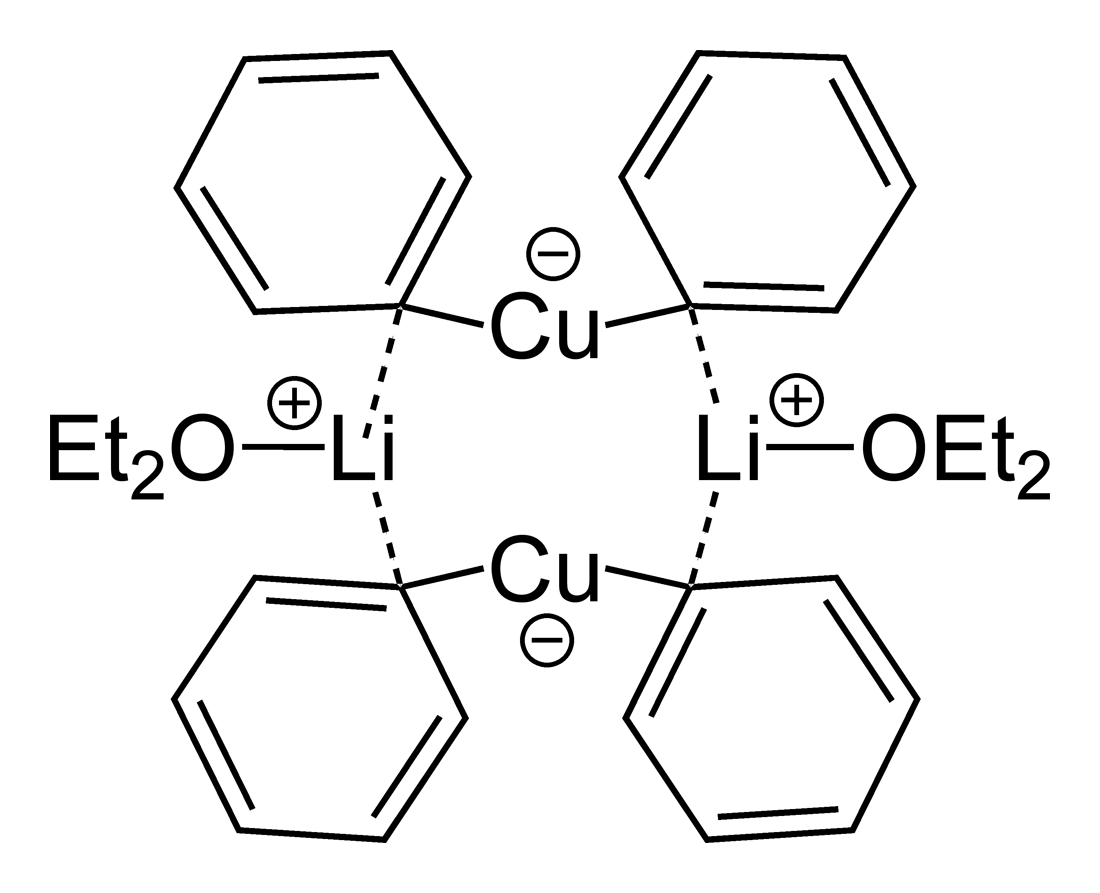
Structure of lithium diphenylcuprate(I) etherate, 2Ph_{2}Cu]^{−}Li^{+}·2OEt_{2}.

Cuprates have a role in organic synthesis. They are invariably Cu(I), although Cu(II) or even Cu(III) intermediates are invoked in some chemical reactions. Organic cuprates often have the idealized formulas CuR_{2}^{−} and CuR_{3}^{2−}, both of which contain copper in an oxidation state of +1, where R is an alkyl or aryl. These reagents find use as nucleophilic alkylating reagents.

== See also ==
- Cuprate superconductor
- High-temperature superconductivity
- Gilman reagent
