= Potassium hexafluorocuprate(III) =

Inorganic paramagnetic solid

Potassium hexafluorocuprate(III) is an inorganic compound with the chemical formula K_{3}CuF_{6}. It is a green paramagnetic solid, a relatively rare example of a copper(III) compound.

== Synthesis and structure ==
The compound is prepared by oxidizing the mixture of potassium chloride and cuprous chloride with fluorine:

3 KCl + CuCl + 3 F_{2} → K_{3}CuF_{6} + 2 Cl_{2}

A variety of analogues are known. The compound reacts with water easily, producing oxygen and copper(II) products.

== See also ==
- Cuprate(III)
- Caesium hexafluorocuprate(IV)
