= Kharasch–Sosnovsky reaction =

Chemical reaction

The Kharasch–Sosnovsky reaction is a method that involves using a copper or cobalt salt as a catalyst to oxidize olefins at the allylic position, subsequently condensing a peroxy ester (e.g. tert-Butyl peroxybenzoate) or a peroxide resulting in the formation of allylic benzoates or alcohols via radical oxidation. This method is noteworthy for being the first allylic functionalization to utilize first-row transition metals and has found numerous applications in chemical and total synthesis. Chiral ligands can be used to render the reaction asymmetric, constructing chiral C–O bonds via C–H bond activation. This is notable as asymmetric addition to allylic groups tends to be difficult due to the transition state being highly symmetric. The reaction is named after Morris S. Kharasch and George Sosnovsky who first reported it in 1958. This method is noteworthy for being the first allylic functionalization to utilize first-row transition metals and has found numerous applications in chemical and total synthesis.

== Modifications ==
Substituted oxazolines and thiazolines can be oxidized to the corresponding oxazoles and thiazoles via a modification of the classic reaction.

== Mechanism ==
Although the mechanism of Kharasch-Sosnovsky oxidation is not fully understood, the general aspects have been established. The reaction is known to undergo a radical mechanism. Taking the most representative reaction as an example, most of the studies suggest that the Cu(I) and perester complex can go through a homolytic dissociation of the perester through coordination of a Cu(I) salt, leading to the formation of a Cu(II) complex and tert-butoxyl radical. However, the mechanism of Cu(II) to Cu(III) remains unknown. Several mechanistic studies hypothesize it can undergo multiple steps to generate the allyl- Cu(III) key intermediate. In the final step, the C-O bond formation between the alkenyl and benzoate occurs through the reductive elimination of the copper(III) complex.

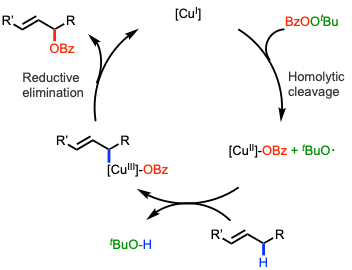

The last step, a reductive elimination of an organocopper(III) intermediate to regenerate the Cu(I) catalyst and form the product, is proposed to take place via a seven-membered ring transition state.

=== Regioselectivity ===
In the original work on Kharasch-Sosnovsky oxidation, Kharasch and Sosnovsky observed the selective formation of the branched product over the linear product with 1-octene in a ratio of 99:1.
It is notable that the reaction favors the thermodynamically less stable terminal alkene. Mechanistic investigations later suggested that the reaction proceeds through a 7-membered ring organo-copper (III) species in a pericyclic reaction, resulting in an unrearranged terminal alkene product.

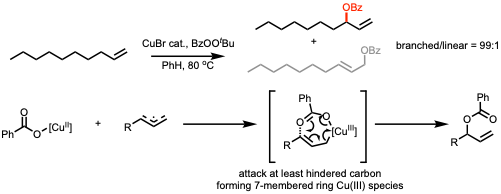

=== Stereoselectivity ===
Since the reaction usually generates a stereogenic center, multiple asymmetric variants of this transformation have been developed. To achieve the stereoselectivity, employing bidentate chiral ligand into the reactions is the most common strategy, inducing the asymmetric formation of benzoate often relies on the ability of the ligand and Cu(III). Some examples of frequently used ligands are oxazolines, pyridines, and C3 symmetric oxazoles.

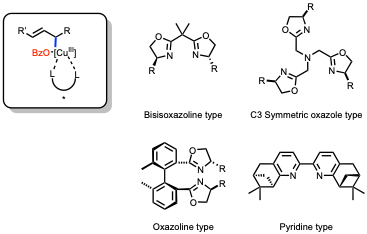

== Applications in total synthesis ==
Since the early 20th century, the scientific community has been aware of the oxidation of allylic C-H bonds. This reactivity can be attributed to the weakening strength of allylic and benzylic C-H bonds by approximately 16.4-16.7 kcal/mol, compared to a regular C-H bond. In the late 1950s, Kharasch—Sosnovsky oxidation was developed. Since then, there have been multiple studies employing first-row transition metals (especially copper)-mediated reactions to install functional groups in the allylic position.

=== Corey's Synthesis of Oleanolic Acid ===
One of the examples is from Corey and his co-workers' synthesis of oleanolic acid in 1993. They employed Kharasch—Sosnovsky oxidation in a novel manner to access OBz intermediate. Initially, vinylcyclopropane was treated with CuBr and tert-butyl perbenzoate, resulting in the abstraction of a hydrogen atom, leading to the formation of allylic radical. Subsequently, the allylic radical underwent a transformation through the homolytic cleavage of the cyclopropane ring, followed by the recombination of the resulting primary and benzoyloxy radicals. This unique combination of the Kharasch reaction and the Simmons−Smith cyclopropanation facilitated the introduction of the cyclopropyl group, enabling the efficient and stereoselective installation of an oxidized methyl group.

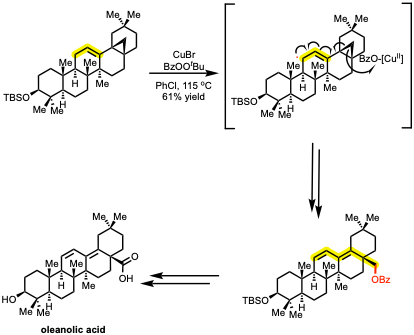

=== Mukaiyama's Synthesis of Taxol ===
Another example is from Mukaiyama's Taxol synthesis in 1999 Mukaiyama's group utilized the Kharasch reaction to introduce an oxidation on the Taxol C-ring. By treating with an excess of CuBr and tert-butyl perbenzoate, a mixture was obtained. After separating the two bromides, Mukaiyama and his colleagues were able to convert side product into the desired through isomerization using CuBr in MeCN at 50 °C. The efficient conversion of the relatively inert alkene to the reactive allylic bromide played a crucial role in the success of Mukaiyama's synthesis, as the allylic bromide served as the necessary component to construct the oxetane D ring.

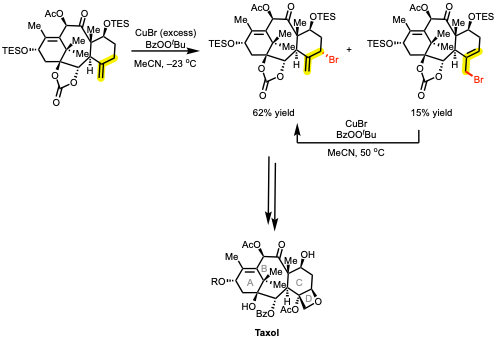
