= Caesium hexafluorocuprate(IV) =

Chemical compound with +4 oxidized copper

Names
- Other names Cesium hexafluorocuprate; Dicesium hexafluorocuprate

Identifiers
CAS Number	43070-30-0
3D model (JSmol)	Interactive image
- InChI: InChI=1S/2Cs.Cu.6FH/h;;;6*1H/q2*+1;+4;;;;;;/p-6 Key: JSYFPWMRKBASLN-UHFFFAOYSA-H
- SMILES: [Cs+].[Cs+].F[Cu-2](F)(F)(F)(F)F

Properties
Chemical formula	Cs_{2}CuF_{6}
Molar mass	443.35 g/mol
Appearance	Red orange solid
- Except where otherwise noted, data are given for materials in their standard state (at 25 °C [77 °F], 100 kPa). Infobox references

Caesium hexafluorocuprate is the inorganic compound with the chemical formula Cs_{2}CuF_{6}. It is a red solid that degrades upon contact with water. It was first prepared by heating CsCuCl_{3} and caesium fluoride at 410 °C under 350 atmospheres of fluorine:

2 CsCuCl_{3} + 2 CsF + 5 F_{2} → 2 Cs_{2}CuF_{6} + 3 Cl_{2}

The anion [CuF_{6}]^{2-} is a rare example of a copper(IV) complex. In terms of its electronic structure, the anion has a low-spin d^{7} configuration. It is thus susceptible to Jahn-Teller distortion.
