= Asymmetric addition of alkynylzinc compounds to aldehydes =

Chemical reaction

The asymmetric addition of alkynylzinc compounds to aldehydes is an example of a Nef synthesis, a chemical reaction whereby a chiral propargyl alcohol is prepared from a terminal alkyne and an aldehyde. This alkynylation reaction is enantioselective and involves an alkynylzinc reagent rather than the sodium acetylide used by John Ulric Nef in his 1899 report of the synthetic approach. Propargyl alcohols are versatile precursors for the chirally-selective synthesis of natural products and pharmaceutical agents, making this asymmetric addition reaction of alkynylzinc compounds useful. For example, Erick Carreira used this approach in a total synthesis of the marine natural product leucascandrolide A, a bioactive metabolite of the calcareous sponge Leucascandra caveolata with cytotoxic and antifungal properties isolated in 1996 (an earlier partial synthesis was reported by Crimmins and a total synthesis was reported by James Leighton).

Examples of ligands used in asymmetric addition of alkynylzinc compounds to aldehydes.

Various chiral ligands have been studied for use in this reaction. The acidity of the terminal alkynyl proton allows the alkynylzinc compound to be generated in situ from the appropriate alkyne with an alkylzinc reagent or zinc triflate, Zn(OTf)_{2}. The first example of catalytic asymmetric addition of alkynylzinc compounds to aldehydes was reported by Kensō Soai and co-workers in 1990. In their experiments, chiral amino alcohols (A and B in the figure) and amines (such as C) were used as ligands, and the alkynylzinc reagent was prepared from reaction of alkyne with diethylzinc. Yields were high but the resulting enantiomeric excesses were poor, the greatest achieved being only 34% with 5 mol% ligand loading. Carreira and co-workers achieved significantly higher enantiomeric excesses (up to 99%) using stoichiometric amounts of the (1S, 2R)-enantiomer of N-methylephedrine (D) at room temperature with a broad range of aldehydes, and generating the alkynylzinc compound using Zn(OTf)_{2}.
