= Alkynylation =

Addition reaction

In organic chemistry, alkynylation is an addition reaction in which a terminal alkyne (−C≡CR') is added to a carbonyl group (C=O) to form an propargylic alcohol (R_{2}C(−OH)−C≡C−R').

When the acetylide is formed from acetylene (HC≡CH), the reaction gives an α-ethynyl alcohol. This process is often referred to as ethynylation. Such processes often involve metal acetylide intermediates.

== Implementation ==
The principal reaction of interest involves the addition of the acetylene (HC≡CR') to a ketone (R_{2}C=O) or aldehyde (R−CH=O):

R_{2}C=O + HC≡CR' → R_{2}C(OH)C≡CR'

The reaction proceeds with retention of the triple bond. For aldehydes and unsymmetrical ketones, the product is chiral, hence there is interest in asymmetric variants. These reactions invariably involve metal-acetylide intermediates.

This reaction was discovered by chemist John Ulric Nef in 1899 while experimenting with reactions of elemental sodium, phenylacetylene, and acetophenone. For this reason, the reaction is sometimes referred to as Nef synthesis. Sometimes this reaction is erroneously called the Nef reaction, a name more often used to describe a different reaction (see Nef reaction). Walter Reppe coined the term ethynylation during his work with acetylene and carbonyl compounds.

In a typical implementation, a terminal alkyne, e.g., ethyl propiolate is deprotonated by n-butyllithium to form lithium acetylelide, which adds to ketones.

R≡CH^{+} BuLi → RC≡CLi + BuH
R≡CLi + R'_{2}C=O → RC≡C−C(OLi)R'_{2}

A variety of bases can be employed in place of alkyl lithiums, e.g. Grignard reagents

An acidic work-up affords the alkynyl alcohol:

RC≡C−C(OLi)R'_{2} + H^{+} → RC≡C−C(OH)R'_{2} + Li^{+}

Common solvents for the reaction are ethers, acetals, dimethylformamide, and dimethyl sulfoxide.

=== Modifications ===
Several modifications of alkynylation reactions are known:

- In the Arens–van Dorp synthesis the compound ethoxyacetylene is converted to a Grignard reagent and reacted with a ketone, the reaction product is a propargyl alcohol.
- In the Isler modification of the Arens–Van Dorp Synthesis, ethoxyacetylene is replaced by β-chlorovinyl ethyl ether, and the lithium acetylide is generated in situ using lithium amide.
- Catalytic variants are the basis of industrial processes.
- Asymmetric alkynylations have been developed. Various catalytic additions of alkynes to electrophiles in water have also been developed.

== Uses ==
Alkynylation finds use in synthesis of pharmaceuticals, particularly in the preparation of steroid hormones. For example, ethynylation of 17-ketosteroids produces important contraceptive medications known as progestins. Examples include drugs such as norethisterone, ethisterone, and lynestrenol. Hydrogenation of these compounds produces anabolic steroids with oral bioavailability, such as norethandrolone.

Alkynylation is used to prepare commodity chemicals such as propargyl alcohol, butynediol, 2-methylbut-3-yn-2-ol (a precursor to isoprenes such as vitamin A), 3-hexyne-2,5-diol (a precursor to furaneol), and sulcatone (a precursor to linalool).

== Variations ==
=== Favorskii reaction ===
The Favorskii reaction is an alternative set of reaction conditions, which involves prereaction of the acetylene with an alkali metal hydroxide such as KOH. The reaction proceeds through equilibria, making the reaction reversible:

1. $\ce{HC#CH + KOH <=> HC#CK + H2O}$
2. $\ce{RR'C=O + HC#CK <=> RR'C(OK)C#CH}$

To overcome this reversibility, the reaction often uses an excess of base to trap the water as hydrates.

=== Reppe chemistry ===
Chemist Walter Reppe pioneered catalytic, industrial-scale ethynylations using acetylene with alkali metal and copper(I) acetylides:

These reactions are used to manufacture propargyl alcohol and butynediol. Alkali metal acetylides, which are often more effective for ketone additions, are used to produce 2-methyl-3-butyn-2-ol from acetylene and acetone.

== See also ==
- Alkylation
- Methylation
- Organolithium reagent
- Organosodium chemistry

=== Alkyne coupling reactions ===
- Sonogashira coupling
- Glaser coupling
- Cadiot–Chodkiewicz coupling
- Castro–Stephens coupling
- A3 coupling reaction
