= Organozinc chemistry =

Study of compounds with carbon to zinc bonds

Organozinc chemistry

Organozinc chemistry is the study of the physical properties, synthesis, and reactions of organozinc compounds, which are organometallic compounds that contain carbon (C) to zinc (Zn) chemical bonds.

Organozinc compounds were among the first organometallic compounds made. They are less reactive than many other analogous organometallic reagents, such as Grignard and organolithium reagents. In 1848 Edward Frankland prepared the first organozinc compound, diethylzinc, by heating ethyl iodide in the presence of zinc metal. This reaction produced a volatile colorless liquid that spontaneous combusted upon contact with air. Due to their pyrophoric nature, organozinc compounds are generally prepared using air-free techniques. They are unstable toward protic solvents. For many purposes they are prepared in situ, not isolated, but many have been isolated as pure substances and thoroughly characterized.

Organozincs can be categorized according to the number of carbon substituents that are bound to the metal.

1. Diorganozinc (R_{2}Zn): A class of organozinc compounds in which two alkyl ligands. These may be further divided into subclasses depending on the other ligands attached
2. Heteroleptic (RZnX): Compounds which an electronegative or monoanionic ligand (X), such as a halide, is attached to the zinc center with another alkyl or aryl substituent (R).
3. Ionic organozinc compounds: This class is divided into organozincates (R_{n}Zn^{−}) and organozinc cations (RZnL^{+}_{n}).

== Bonding ==
In its coordination complexes zinc(II) adopts several coordination geometries, commonly octahedral, tetrahedral, and various pentacoordinate geometries. These structural flexibility can be attributed to zinc's electronic configuration [Ar]3d^{10}4s^{2}. The 3d orbital is filled, and therefore, ligand field effects are nonexistent. Coordination geometry is thus determined largely by electrostatic and steric interactions.

In organozinc compounds, carbon and zinc atoms form a polar covalent bond. The bond is polarized toward carbon due to the differences in electronegativity values (carbon: 2.5 & zinc: 1.65), but still about 85% covalent, comparable to a carbon-tin bond.

Because zinc has a large atomic radius and low electron deficiency, organozinc compounds rarely saturate zinc's coordination sphere. Instead, they are usually two- or three-coordinate, reflecting strong donation from the carbanionic ligands. Diorganozinc species complex ethereal solvents only weakly, and bridging alkyl or aryl groups are rare. Exceptions are Ph_{2}Zn and certain metal clusters:

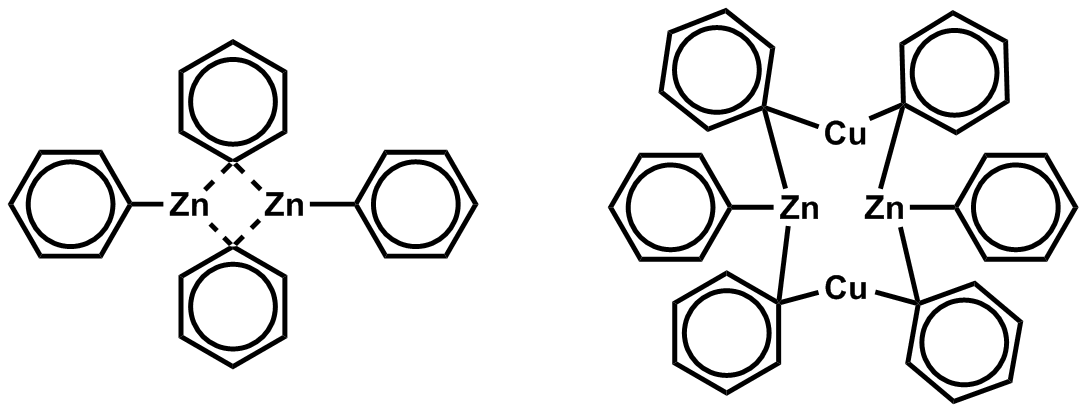

Organozinc complexes with formula R_{2}Zn are monomeric and linear at the zinc atom, generating sp-hybridization in the molecular orbitals. The symmetric molecules have no dipole moment, and dissolve easily in nonpolar solvents like cyclohexane. When a halogen ligand is added to the zinc atom, the molecule is polarized and both the acceptor and donor character of zinc is enhanced, allowing for aggregation.

== Synthesis ==
Several methods exist for the generation of organozinc compounds. Commercially available diorganozinc compounds are dimethylzinc, diethylzinc and diphenylzinc, but these reagents are expensive and difficult to handle.

=== From zinc metal ===
Frankland's original synthesis of diethylzinc involves the reaction of ethyl iodide with zinc metal. Similar to formation of a Grignard reagent, the zinc must be activated to facilitate this redox reaction, and ethereal solvents accelerate the reaction by stabilizing the product. One of such activated form of zinc employed by Frankland is zinc-copper couple:

2 EtI + 2 Zn^{0} → Et_{2}Zn + ZnI_{2}

Alternatively, in situ reduction of ZnCl_{2} with potassium generates Riecke zinc, another activated form of zinc:
$$\ce{{ZnCl2} + 2K ->[\ce{THF}][\ce{-2KCl}]} \overbrace\ce{Zn^0}^\ce{Riecke\ zinc} + \ce{R-X ->[\ce{THF}][20-60^\circ\ce C] R-Zn-I} \qquad
\begin{cases}
\mathbf{R}: &\text{Allyl, Aryl, Alkyl, Benzyl}\\
\mathbf{X}: &\text{Bromide, Iodide}
\end{cases}$$

In some cases, a weak Lewis acid, suffices to activate the zinc metal. For example, in the following synthesis, 1,2-dibromoethane and trimethylsilyl chloride catalyze formation of the final organozinc through transmetallation, but a key ingredient is lithium chloride, which quickly forms a soluble adduct with the bromoethylzinc intermediate, removing it from the metal surface:

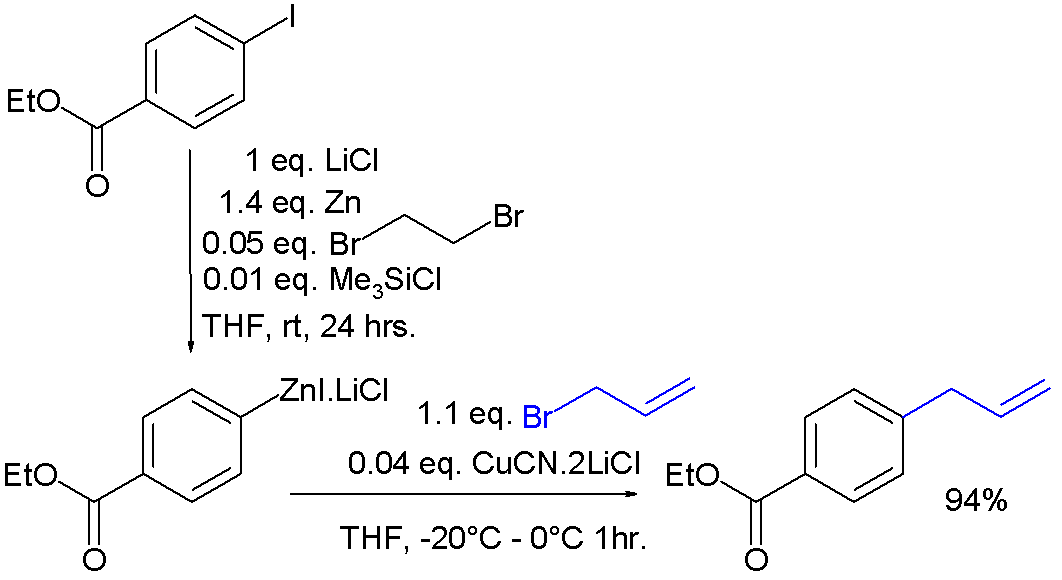
Organozinc Synthesis by Direct Insertion

Formation of organozinc reagents is generally facilitated when alkyl or aryl halides bearing electron-withdrawing substituents, e.g., nitriles and esters; these are the first step in the Reformatsky and Blaise reactions.

=== Zinc-halogen exchange ===
One of the most common zinc functional group interconversion reactions forms a complicated organozinc compound from exchange of an alkyl halide with a cheaper organozinc:

RI + ZnMe_{2} → R_{2}Zn + MeI

The reaction requires either copper iodide (CuI) or base catalysis.

=== Transmetalation ===
A wide variety of organo-metal and organo-semimetal compounds admit transmetalation to organozincs. One example is the reaction of diphenylmercury with zinc metal to form diphenylzinc and metallic mercury:

HgPh_{2} + Zn → ZnPh_{2} + Hg

As a practical matter, organozinc compounds are most commonly made from metal exchange between a cheap organozinc and organoboron compounds, the latter from an initial hydroboration:

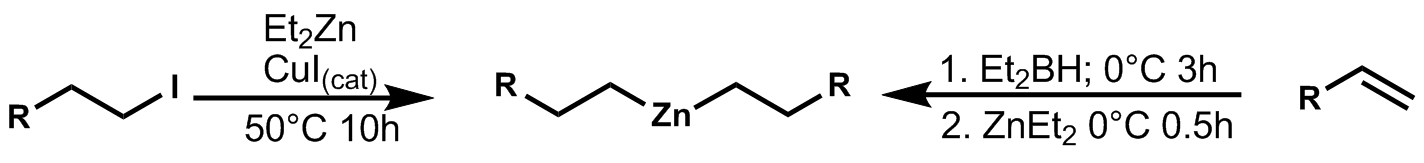
Organozinc function group exchange with metals or boron reagents

The benefit of transmetalation to zinc is improved functional group tolerance: organozincs are less reactive than many organometals, and consequently selective for the most reactive site in the molecule.

For example, zinc moderates various alkyllithium reagents:

- In the synthesis of Maoecrystal V, a directed ortho metalation gives the initial aryl-lithium species, which is transmetallated to the desired arylzinc compound. The arylzinc compound is significantly less reactive than the aryl-lithium species and thus better tolerates the ester functionality in the subsequent coupling with methyl chlorooxaloacetate.

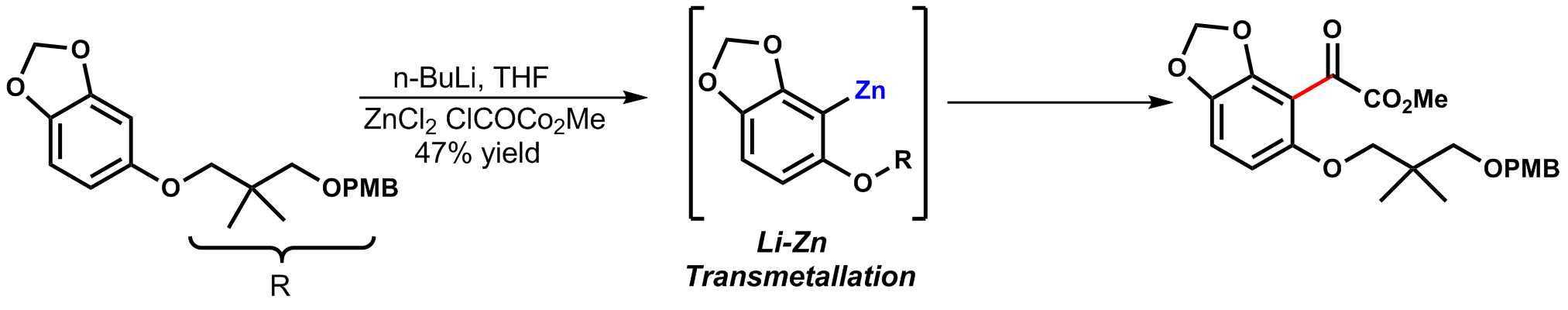
Zakarian's synthesis of Maoecrystal V utilized an early stage zinc transmetallation to tolerate functionality

- In one study, phenyllithium is too reactive in a chiral Grignard-like addition, giving a racemic alcohol even when a chiral catalyst is present. However, transmetalation and chelation of the lithium chloride/bromide wastes gives diphenylzinc, which reacts slowly enough for a borneol-derived chiral catalyst to select the enantiomer:

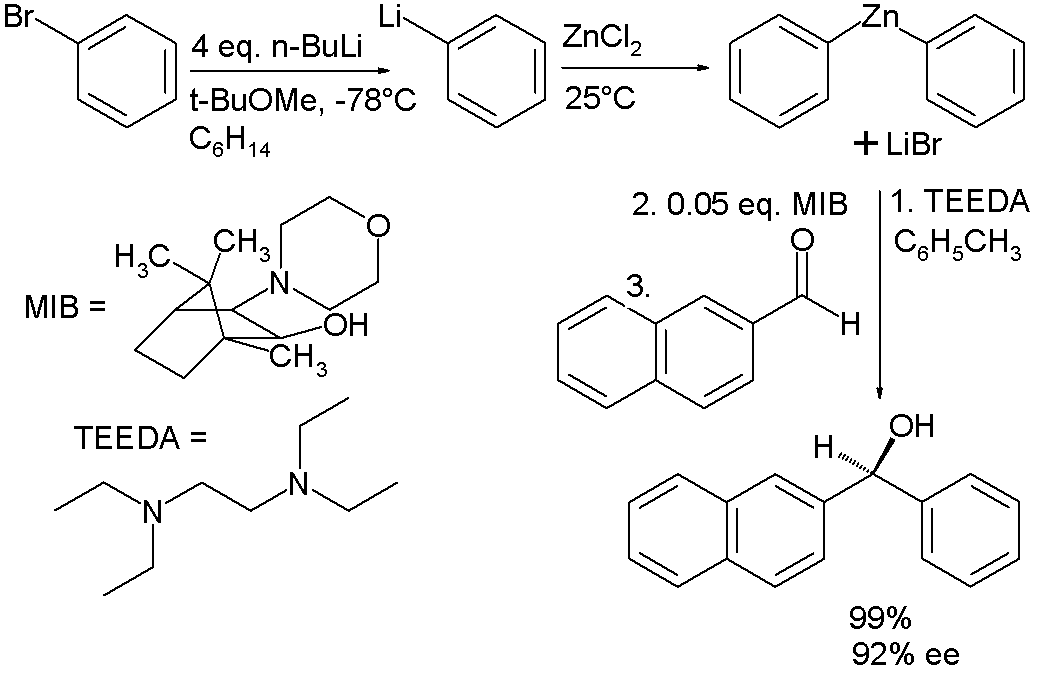
Addition of diphenylzinc to an aldehyde

== Reactions ==
In many of their reactions organozincs appear as intermediates.

Absent additional activation, diorganozinc compounds are generally too nonpolar to react with carbonyl compounds, but do attack unpolarized C-C multiple bonds.

In the Frankland–Duppa reaction (1863) an oxalate ester (ROCOCOOR) reacts with an alkyl halide R'X, zinc and hydrochloric acid to the α-hydroxycarboxylic esters RR'COHCOOR

Organozinc compounds can be used in allylation, or other coupling reactions (such as Negishi coupling):

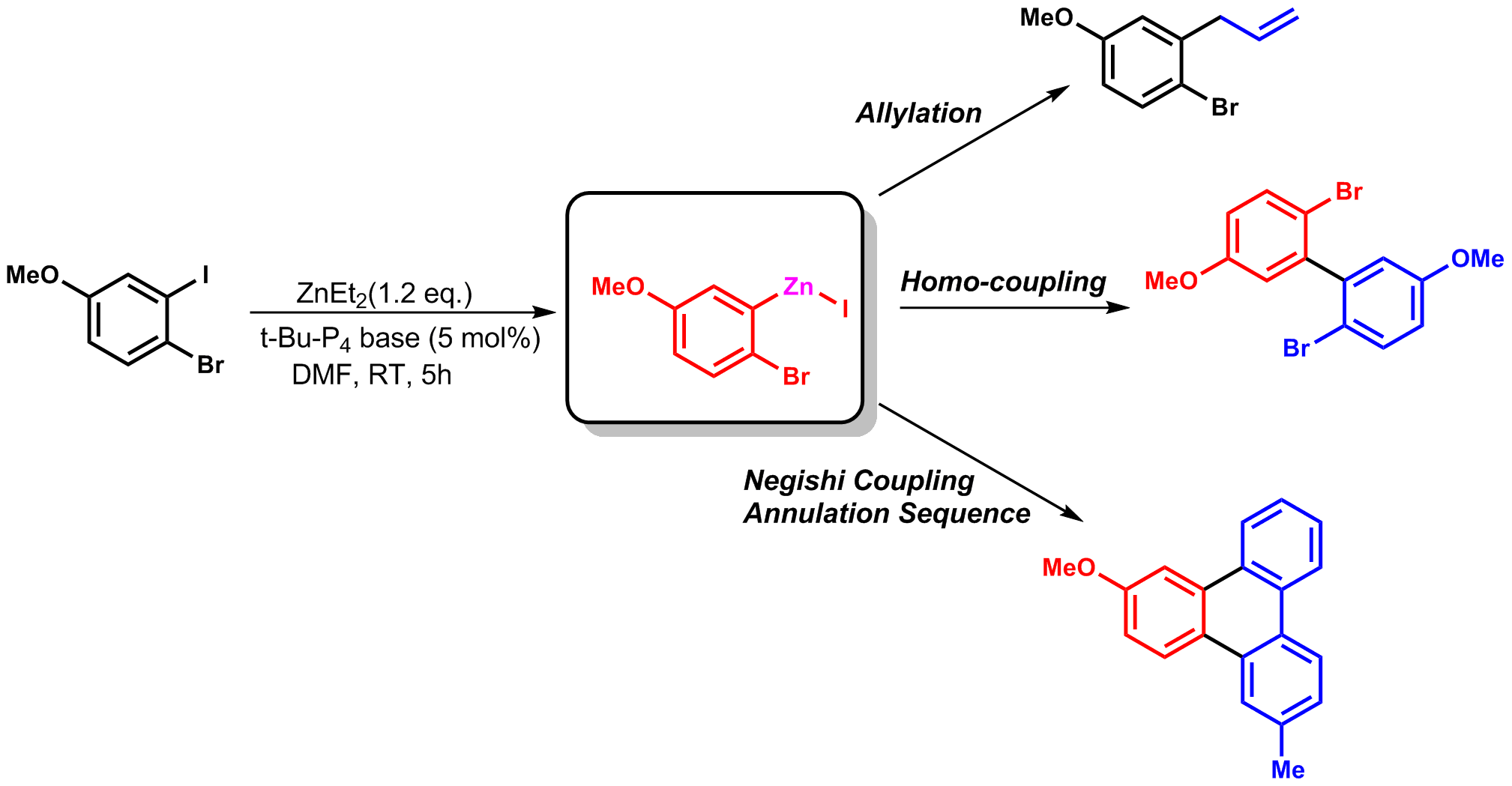
Hiroshi Naka and coworkers utilized this group transfer reaction to get to the key intermediate

One of the major drawbacks of diorganozinc alkylations is that only one of the two alkyl substituents is transferred. This problem can be solved by using trimethylsilylmethyl- (Me_{3}SiCH_{2}-), which is stabilized through negative hyperconjugation in silicon and does not transfer:
$$\begin{array}{l}
{}\\
\ce{{R2Zn} + (TMSM)2Zn}\ \overset\ce{THF}\ce{<=>>} \ \ce{2R(TMSM)Zn}\\ {}\\
\ce{{RZnI} + (TMSM)Li ->[\ce{THF}][-80^\circ\!\ce C] {R(TMSM)Zn} + LiI}\\ {}
\end{array}$$

=== Reformatsky reaction ===
This organic reaction can be employed to convert α-haloester and ketone or aldehyde to a β-hydroxyester. Acid is needed to protonate the resulting alkoxide during work up. The initial step is an oxidative addition of zinc metal into the carbon-halogen bond, thus forming a carbon-zinc enolate. This C-Zn enolate can then rearrange to the Oxygen-Zinc enolate via coordination. Once this is formed the other carbonyl containing starting material will coordinate in the manner shown below and give the product after protonation. The benefits of the Reformatsky reaction over the conventional aldol reaction protocols is the following:

1. Allows for exceedingly derivatized ketone substrates
2. The ester enolate intermediate can be formed in the presence of enolizable moieties
3. Well suited for intramolecular reactions

Below shows the six-membered transition state of the Zimmerman–Traxler model (Chelation Control, see Aldol reaction), in which R^{3} is smaller than R^{4}.

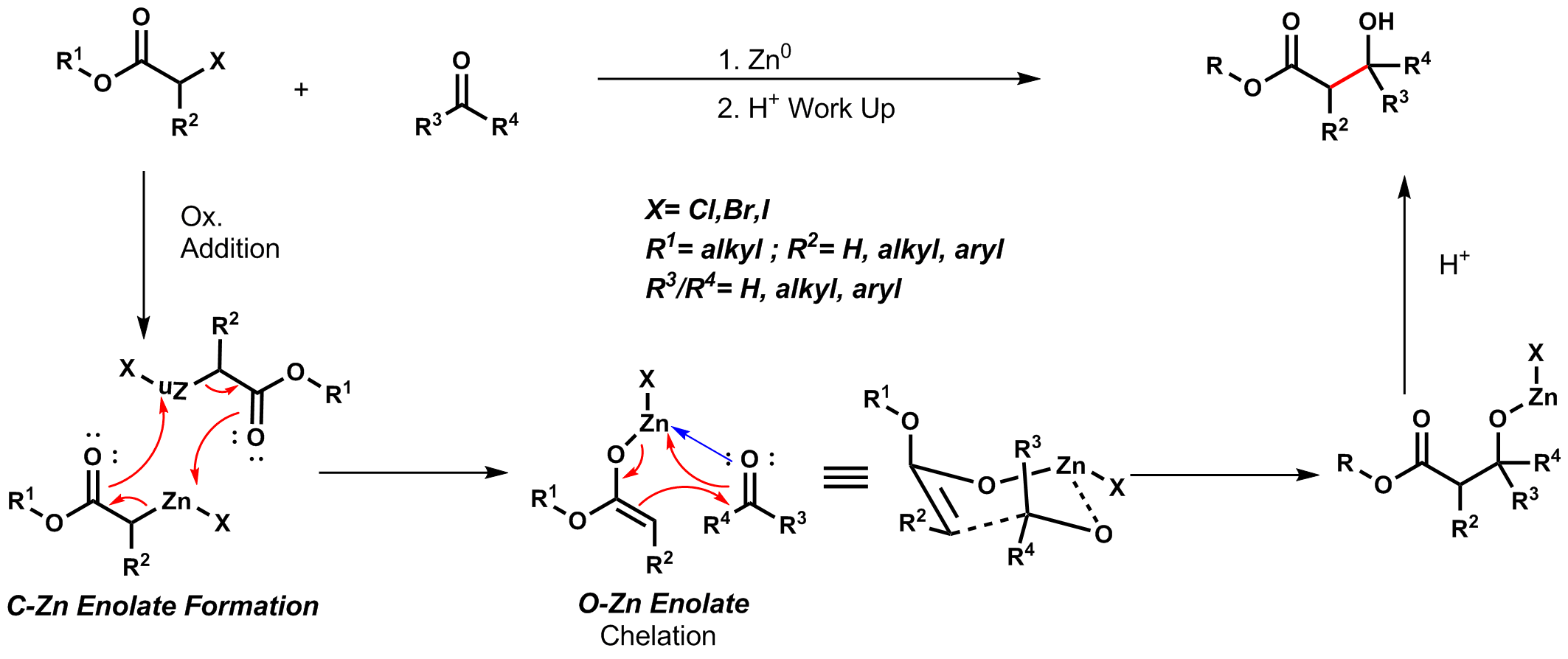
Basic mechanistic scheme of the Reformatsky reaction

The Reformatsky reaction has been employed in numerous total syntheses such as the synthesis of C(16),C(18)-bis-epi-cytochalasin D:

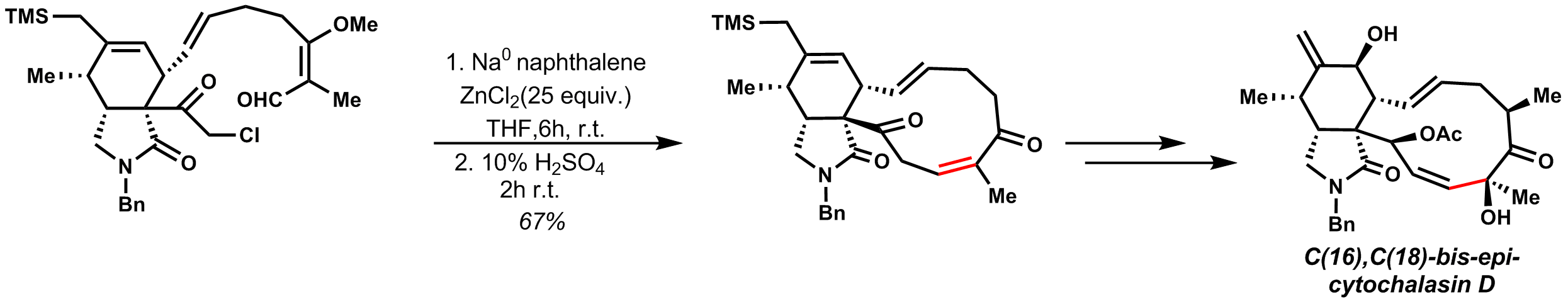
E. Vedejs total synthesis of C(16),C(18)-bis-epi-cytochalasin D uses a late stage Reformatsky reaction to access the natural product

The Reformatsky reaction even allows for with zinc homo-enolates. A modification of the Reformatsky reaction is the Blaise reaction.

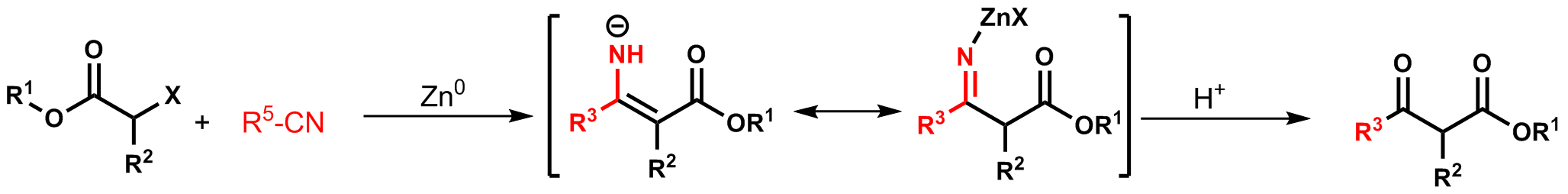
Scheme for the organozinc Blaise reaction, which utilizes an alpha-haloester and a functionalized cyano group

=== Simmons–Smith reaction ===
The Simmons–Smith reagent is used to prepare cyclopropanes from olefin using methylene iodide as the methylene source. The reaction is effected with zinc. The key zinc-intermediate formed is a carbenoid (iodomethyl)zinc iodide which reacts with alkenes to afford the cyclopropanated product. The rate of forming the active zinc species is increased via ultrasonication since the initial reaction occurs at the surface of the metal.
$$2\, {\color{Red}\ce{CH2I2}} + 2\, {\color{Blue}\ce{Zn}}
\ \ce{-> 2}\,
{\color{Red}\ce{ICH2}}{\color{Blue}\ce{ZnI}}
\ \ce{<=>}\
{\color{Red}\ce{(ICH2)2}}{\color{Blue}\ce{Zn}} + {\color{Blue}\ce{Zn}}{\color{Red}\ce{I2}}$$

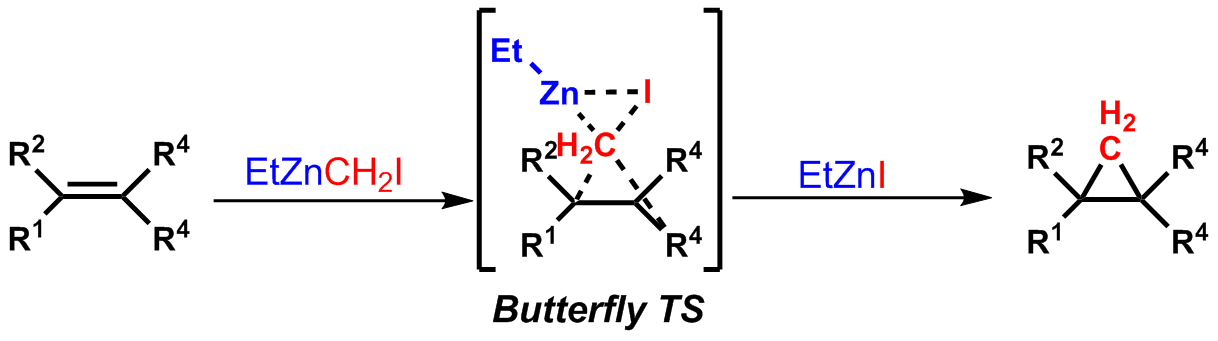
The butterfly TS for the Barbier reaction

Although the mechanism has not been fully elaborated it is hypothesized that the organozinc intermediate is a metal-carbenoid. The intermediate is believed to be a three-centered "butterfly-type". This intermediate can be directed by substituents, such as alcohols, to deliver the cyclopropane on the same side of the molecule. Zinc-copper couple is commonly used to activate zinc.

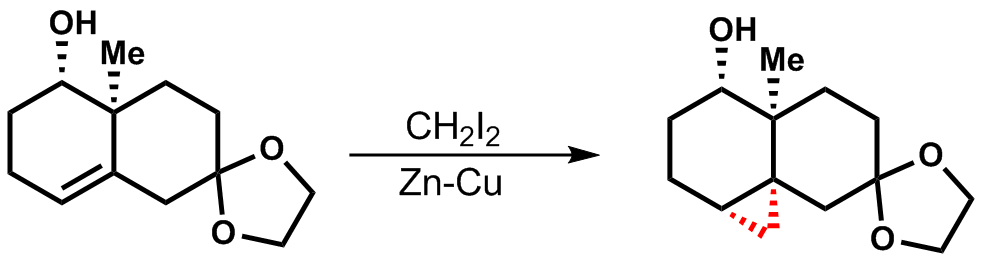
Directing groups aid in the selectivity of the Simmons–Smith reaction

=== Titanium–zinc methylidenation ===
Organozinc compounds derived from methylene bromide or iodide can electrophilically add to carbonyl groups to form terminal alkenes. The reaction is mechanistically related to the Tebbe reaction and can be catalyzed by various Lewis acids (e.g. TiCl_{4} or Al_{2}Me_{6}). The reaction is used to introduce deuterium into molecules for isotopic labeling or as an alternative to the Wittig reaction.

=== Negishi coupling ===
This powerful carbon-carbon bond forming cross-coupling reactions combines an organic halide and an organozinc halide reagent in the presence of a nickel or palladium catalyst. The organic halide reactant can be alkenyl, aryl, allyl, or propargyl. Alkylzinc coupling with alkyl halides such as bromides and chlorides have also been reported with active catalysts such as Pd-PEPPSI precatalysts, which strongly resist beta-hydride elimination (a common occurrence with alkyl substituents). Either diorganic species or organozinc halides can be used as coupling partners during the transmetallation step in this reaction. Despite the low reactivity of organozinc reagents on organic electrophiles, these reagents are among the most powerful metal nucleophiles toward palladium.

Alkylzinc species require the presence of at least a stoichiometric amount of halide ions in solution to form a "zincate" species of the form RZnX_{3}^{2−}, before it can undergo transmetalation to the palladium centre. This behavior contrasts greatly with the case of aryl zinc species. A key step in the catalytic cycle is a transmetalation in which a zinc halide exchanges its organic substituent for another halogen with the metal center.

An elegant example of Negishi coupling is Furstner's synthesis of amphidinolide T1:

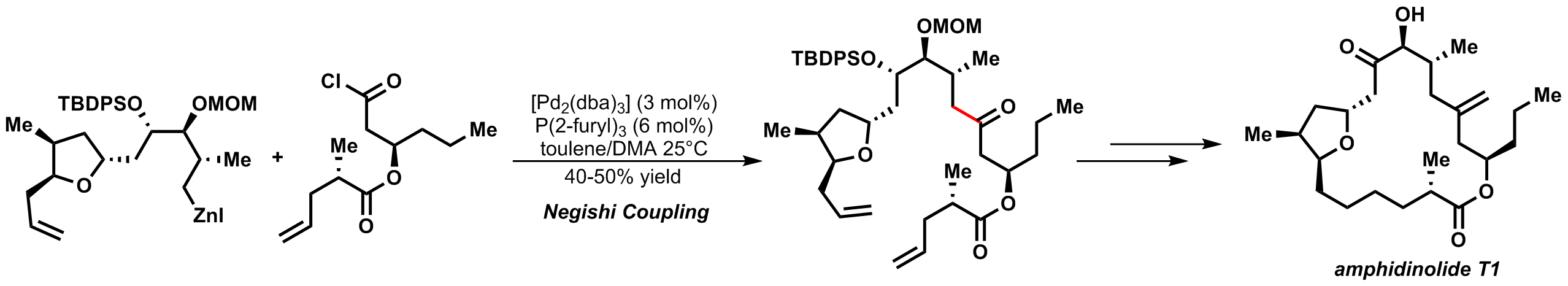
Negishi Cross coupling reaction in the total synthesis of Amphidinolide T1

=== Fukuyama coupling ===
Fukuyama coupling is a palladium-catalyzed reaction involving the coupling of an aryl, alkyl, allyl, or α,β- unsaturated thioester compound. This thioester compound can be coupled to a wide range of organozinc reagents in order to reveal the corresponding ketone product. This protocol is useful due to its sensitivity to functional groups such as ketone, acetate, aromatic halides, and even aldehydes. The chemoselectivity observed indicates ketone formation is more facile than oxidative addition of palladium into these other moieties.

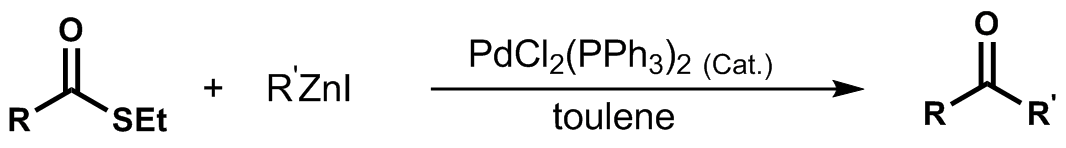
Basic scheme for Fukuyama coupling of thioesters

A further example of this coupling method is the synthesis of (+)-biotin. In this case, the Fukuyama coupling takes place with the thiolactone:

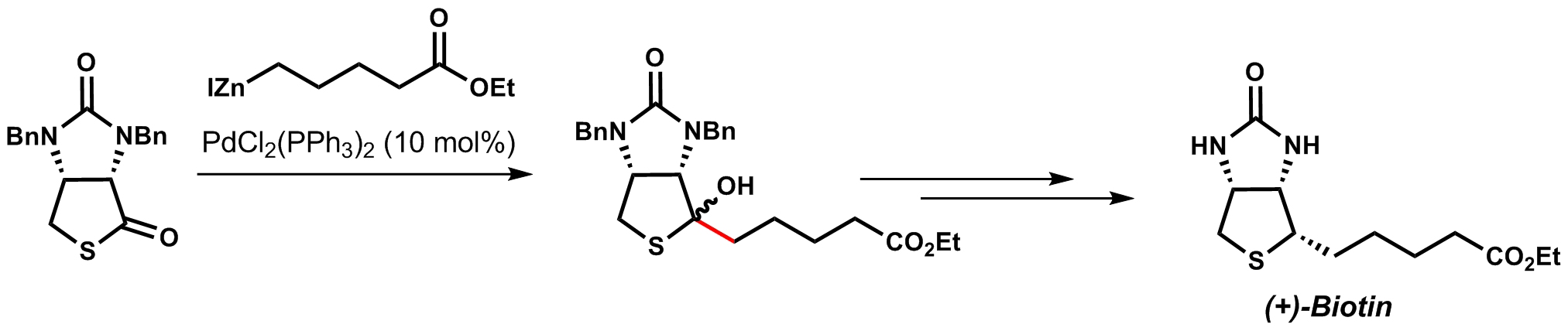
Total synthesis of (+)-biotin using Fukuyama coupling

=== Barbier reaction ===
The Barbier reaction involves nucleophilic addition of a carbanion equivalent to a carbonyl. The conversion is similar to the Grignard reaction. The organozinc reagent is generated via an oxidative addition into the alkyl halide. The reaction produces a primary, secondary, or tertiary alcohol via a 1,2-addition. The Barbier reaction is advantageous because it is a one-pot process: the organozinc reagent is generated in the presence of the carbonyl substrate. Organozinc reagents are also less water sensitive, thus this reaction can be conducted in water. Similar to the Grignard reaction, a Schlenk equilibrium applies, in which the more reactive dialkylzinc can be formed.

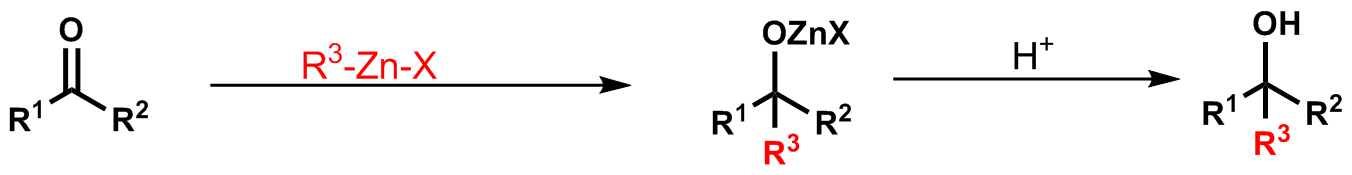
Basic scheme of the Barbier reaction

The mechanism resembles the Grignard reaction, in which the metal alkoxide can be generated by a radical stepwise pathway, through single electron transfer, or concerted reaction pathway via a cyclic transition state. An example of this reaction is in Danishefsky's synthesis of cycloproparadicicol. By using the organozinc addition reaction conditions the other functionality of the dienone and the alkyne are tolerated:

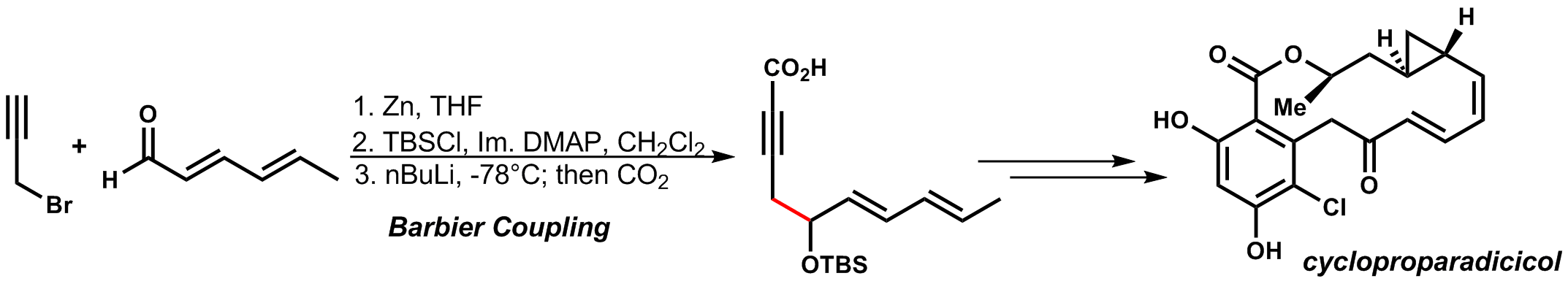
Samuel Danashefskey's total synthesis of cycloproparadiciciol utilizes an early stage Barbier reaction to access the key intermediate

=== Zinc acetylides ===
The formation of the zinc acetylide proceeds via the intermediacy of a dialkynyl zinc (functional group exchange). Catalytic processes have been developed such as Merck's ephedrine process. Propargylic alcohols can be synthesized from zinc acetylides. These versatile intermediates can then be used for a wide range of chemical transformations such as cross-coupling reactions, hydrogenation, and pericyclic reactions.

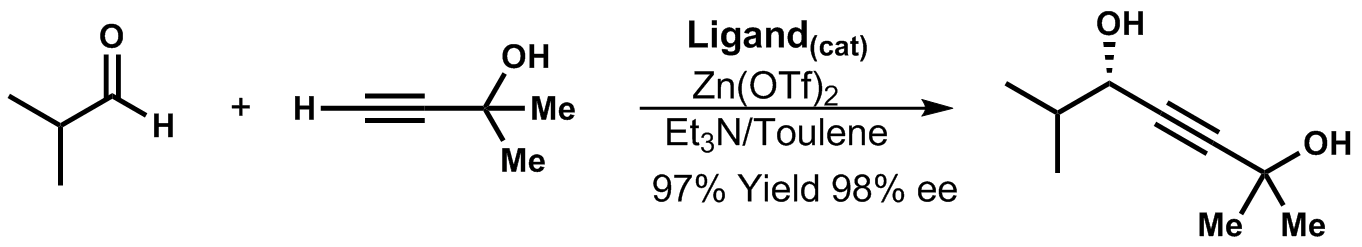
Synthesis of zinc propargylic alcohols

In the absence of ligands, the reaction is slow and inefficient. In the presence of chiral ligands, the reaction is fast and gives high conversion. Ryoji Noyori determined that a monozinc-ligand complex is the active species.

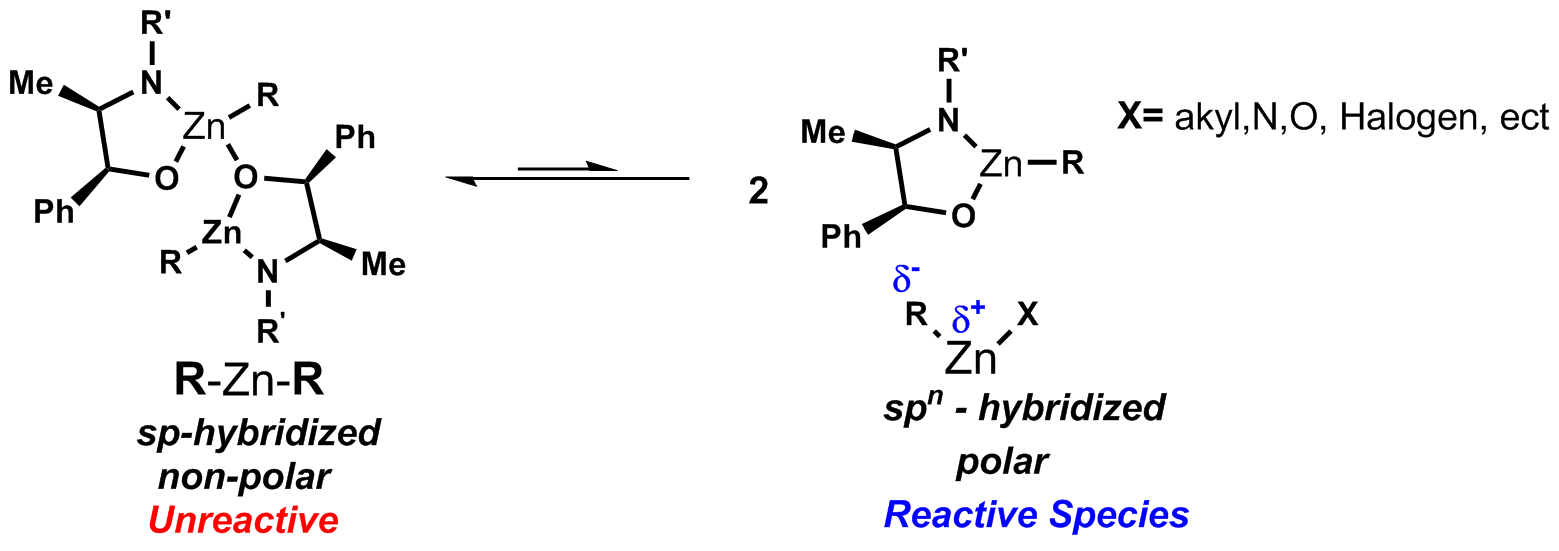
Mono zinc is the most reactive species

Diastereoselectivity for addition of organozinc reagents into aldehydes can be predicted by the following model by Noyori and David A. Evans:

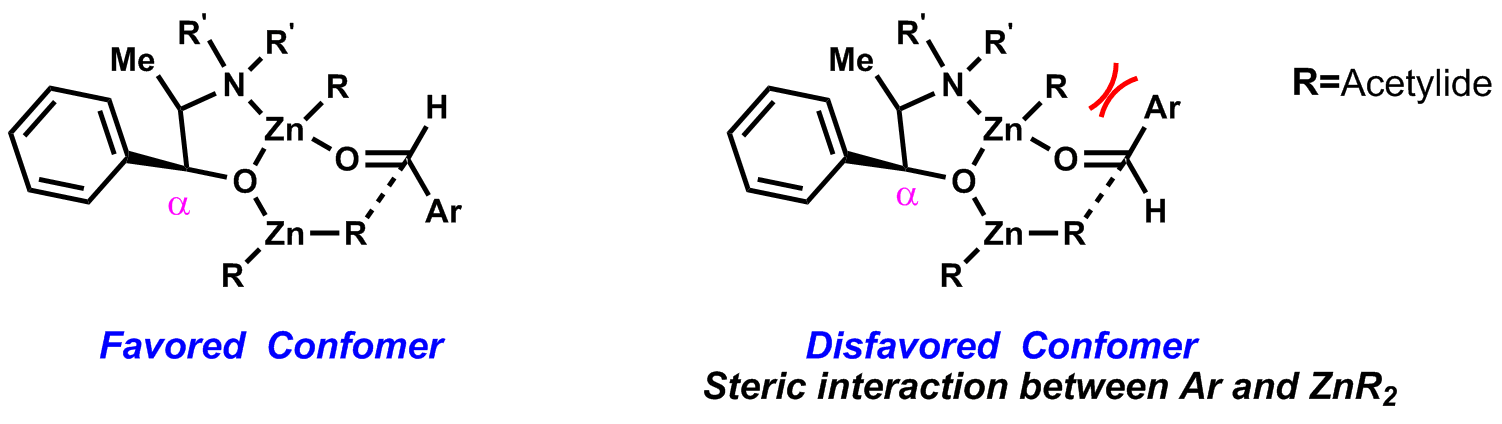
Favored conformer for organozinc aldehyde addition

- The α-stereocenter of the ligand dictates observed stereochemistry of the propargylic alcohols
- The steric effects between the aldehyde substituent and the ligand are less important but still dictate the favored conformation

Zinc-acetylides are used in the HIV-1 reverse transcriptase inhibitor Efavirenz as well as in Merck's ephedrine derivatives .

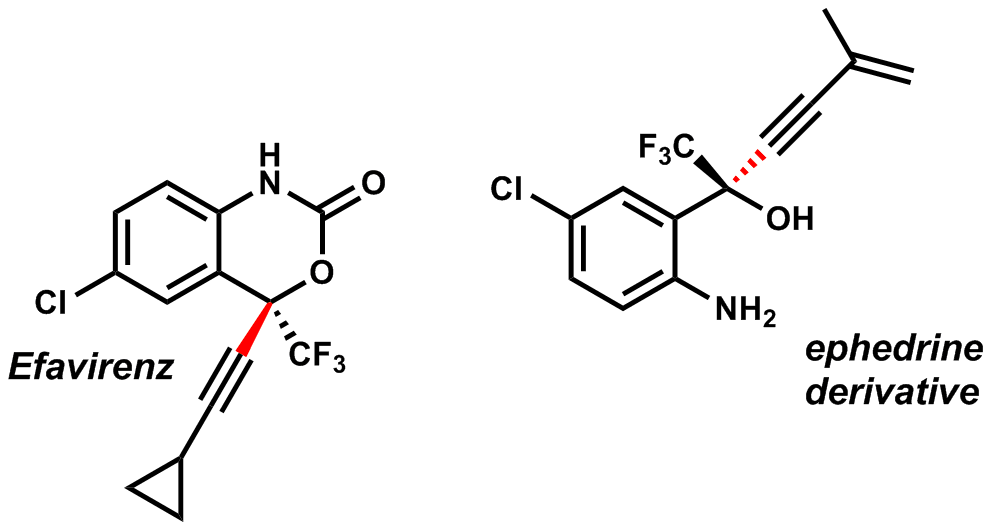
Merck's Effavirenz and ephedrine derivative synthesized via zinc acetylide

== Organozincates ==
The first organozinc ate complex (organozincate) was reported in 1858 by James Alfred Wanklyn, an assistant to Frankland and concerned the reaction of elemental sodium with diethylzinc:

2 Na + 3 ZnEt_{2} → 2 NaZnEt_{3} + Zn

Organozinc compounds that are strongly Lewis acidic are vulnerable to nucleophilic attack by alkali metals, such as sodium, and thus form these 'ate compounds'. Two types of organozincates are recognized: tetraorganozincates ([R_{4}Zn]M_{2}), which are dianionic, and triorganozincates ([R_{3}Zn]M), which are monoanionic. Their structures, which are determined by the ligands, have been extensively characterized.

=== Synthesis ===
Tetraorganozincates such as [Me_{4}Zn]Li_{2} can be formed by mixing Me_{2}Zn and MeLi in a 1:2 molar ratio of the reactants. Another example synthetic route to forming spriocyclic organozincates is shown below:

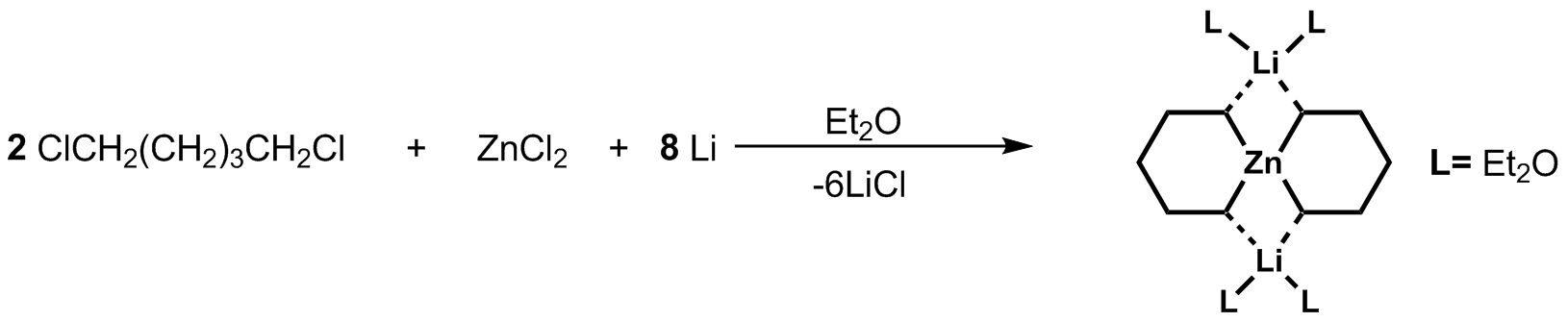
Spirocyclic tetraorganozincate synthesis

Triorganozincates compounds are formed by treating a diorganozinc such as (Me_{3}SiCH_{2})_{2}Zn with an alkali metal (K), or an alkali earth metal (Ba, Sr, or Ca). One example is [(Me_{3}SiCH_{2})_{3}Zn]K. Triethylzincate degrades to sodium hydridoethylzincate(II) as a result of beta-hydride elimination:

2 NaZnEt_{3} → Na_{2}Zn_{2}H_{2}Et_{4} + 2 C_{2}H_{4}

The product is an edge-shared bitetrahedral structure, with bridging hydride ligands.

=== Reactions ===
Although less commonly studied, organozincates often have increased reactivity and selectivity compared to the neutral diorganozinc compounds. They have been useful in stereoselective alkylations of ketones and related carbonyls, ring opening reactions. Aryltrimethylzincates participate in vanadium mediated C-C forming reactions.

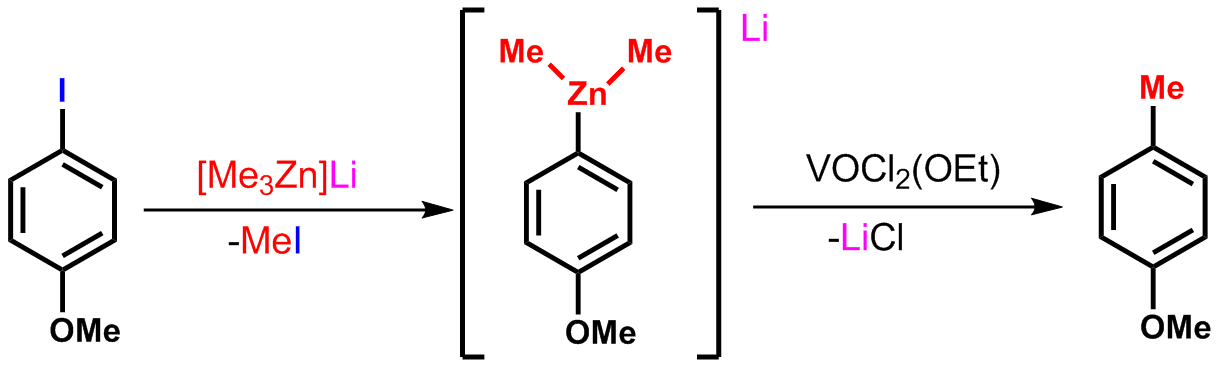
One useful organozincate reaction

== Organozinc(I) compounds ==
Low valent organozinc compounds having a Zn–Zn bond are also known. The first such compound, decamethyldizincocene, was reported in 2004.

== See also ==
- Compounds of zinc
