= Zinc compounds =

Chemical compounds containing zinc

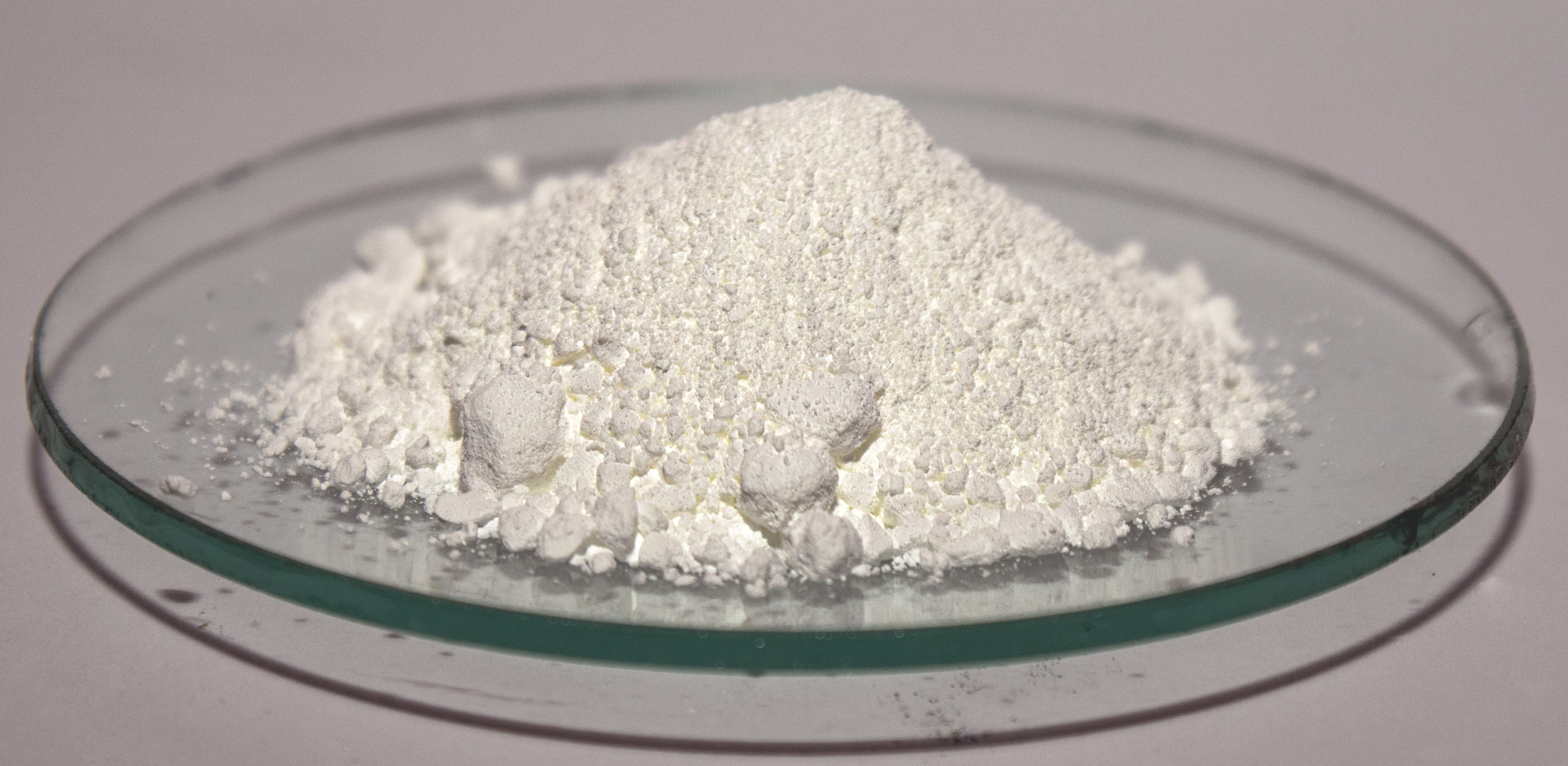
A sample of zinc oxide, a compound of zinc

Zinc compounds are chemical compounds containing the element zinc which is a member of the group 12 of the periodic table. The oxidation state of zinc in most compounds is the group oxidation state of +2. Zinc may be classified as a post-transition main group element with zinc(II). Zinc compounds are noteworthy for their nondescript appearance and behavior: they are generally colorless (unlike compounds of other elements with oxidation number +2, which are colored), do not readily engage in redox reactions, and generally adopt symmetrical structures.

== General characteristics ==
In its compounds, Zn^{2+} ions have an electronic configuration [Ar] 3d^{10}. As such, Zn^{2+} tends to have a symmetrical coordination geometry in both its complexes and compounds. In both ZnO and ZnS, (zincblende) zinc is tetrahedrally bound to four ligands (oxide and sulfide, respectively). Many complexes, such as ZnCl_{4}^{2−}, are tetrahedral. Tetrahedrally coordinated zinc is found in metallo-enzymes such as carbonic anhydrase. Six-coordinate octahedral complexes are also common, such as the aquo complex [Zn(H_{2}O)_{6}]^{2+}, which is present when a zinc salts are dissolved in water. Five- and seven-coordination numbers can be imposed by special organic ligands.

Many zinc(II) salts are isomorphous (have the same type of crystal structure) with the corresponding salts of magnesium(II). This parallel results from the fact that Zn^{2+} and Mg^{2+} have almost identical ionic radii as well as filled electron shells. That two elements so different in atomic number have the same radius is a consequence of the d-block contraction. Whilst calcium is somewhat larger than magnesium, there is a steady decrease in size as atomic number increases from calcium to zinc.

Zn(II) complexes are kinetically labile, i.e. the Zn-ligand bonds exchange with other ligands rapidly. For this reason, zinc ions are at the catalytic centers in many enzymes.

=== Zn(I) ===
Compounds with zinc in the oxidation state +1 are extremely rare. The compounds have the formula RZn_{2}R and they contain a Zn — Zn bond analogous to the metal-metal bond in mercury(I) ion, Hg_{2}^{2+}. In this respect zinc is similar to magnesium where low-valent compounds containing a Mg — Mg bond have been characterised.

=== Other oxidation states ===
No compounds of zinc in oxidation states other than +1 or +2 are known. Calculations indicate that a zinc compound with the oxidation state of +4 is unlikely to exist.

=== Colour and magnetism ===
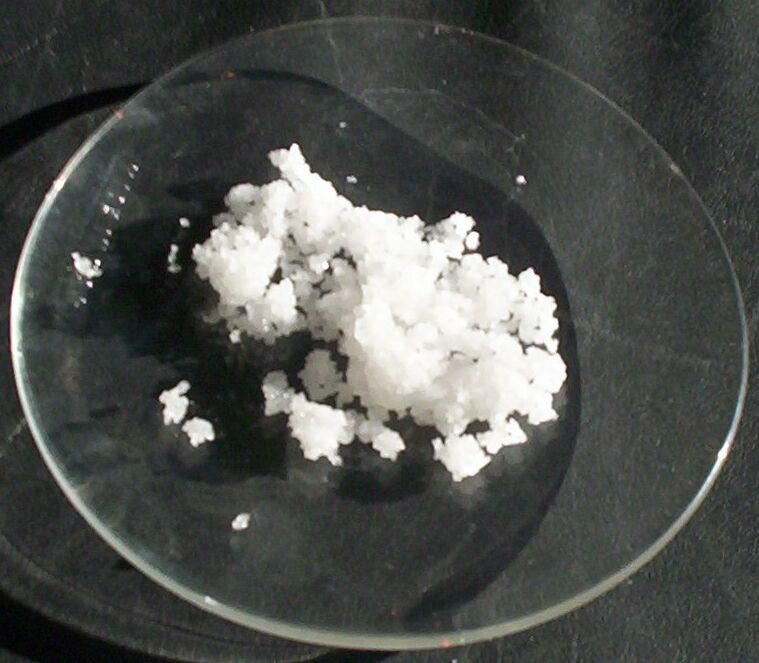
Zinc chloride

Zinc compounds, like those of main group elements, are mostly colourless. Exceptions occur when the compound contains a coloured anion or ligand. However, zinc selenide and zinc telluride are both coloured due to charge-transfer processes. Zinc oxide turns yellow when heated due to the loss of some oxygen atoms and formation of a defect structure. Compounds containing zinc are typically diamagnetic, except in cases where the ligand is a radical.

== Reactivity of metallic zinc ==
Zinc is a strong reducing agent with a standard redox potential of −0.76 V. Pure zinc tarnishes rapidly in air, rapidly forming a passive layer. The composition of this layer can be complex, but one constituent is probably basic zinc carbonate, Zn_{5}(OH)_{6}CO_{3}. The reaction of zinc with water is slowed by this passive layer. When this layer is corroded by acids such as hydrochloric acid and sulfuric acid, the reaction proceeds with the evolution of hydrogen gas.

Zn + 2 H^{+} → Zn^{2+} + H_{2}

Zinc reacts with alkalis as with acids.

With oxidants such as chalcogens and halogens, Zn forms binary compounds such as ZnS and ZnCl_{2}.

== Binary compounds ==
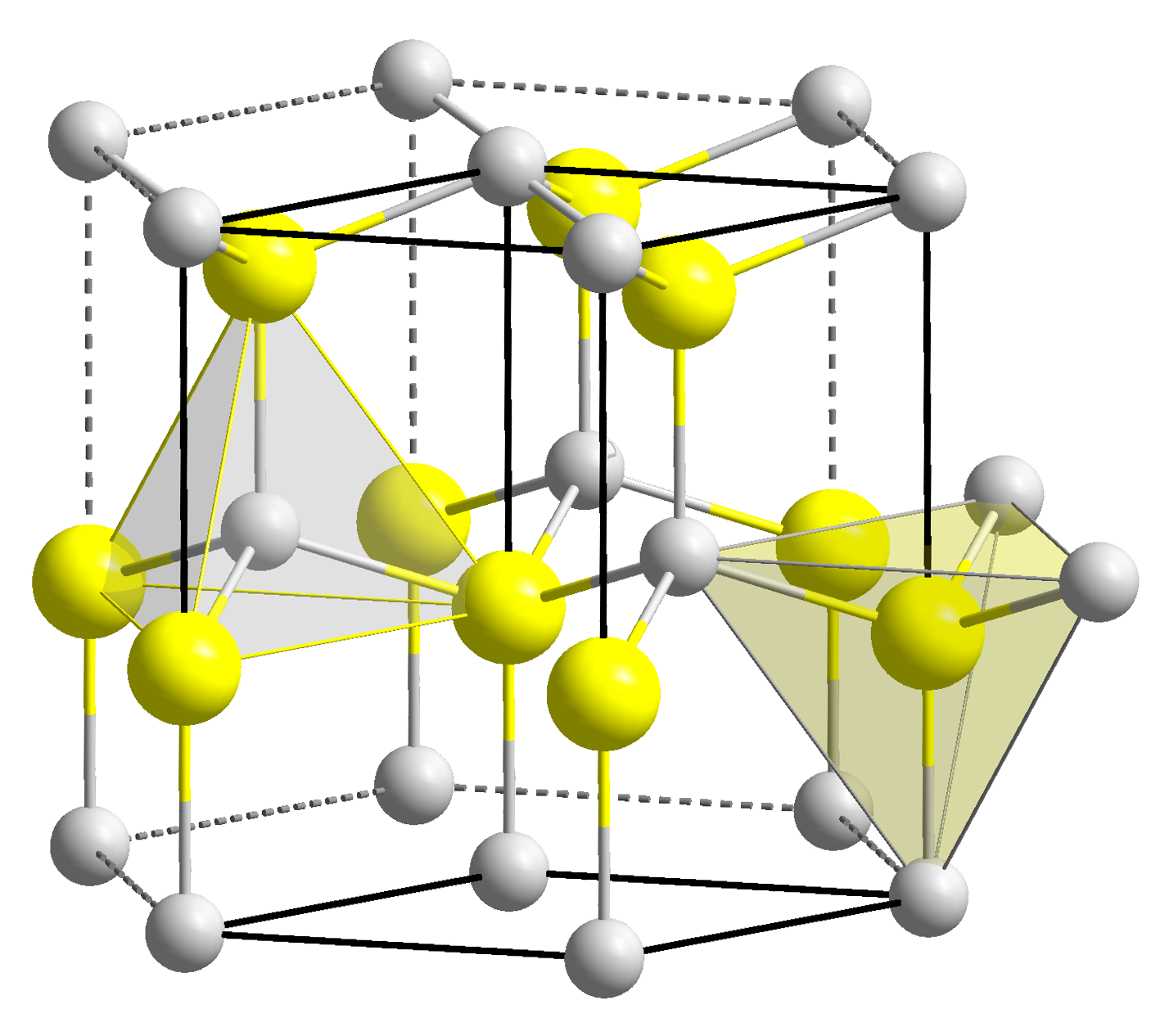
The Wurtzite structure, showing the tetrahedral environment of both Zn and S atoms

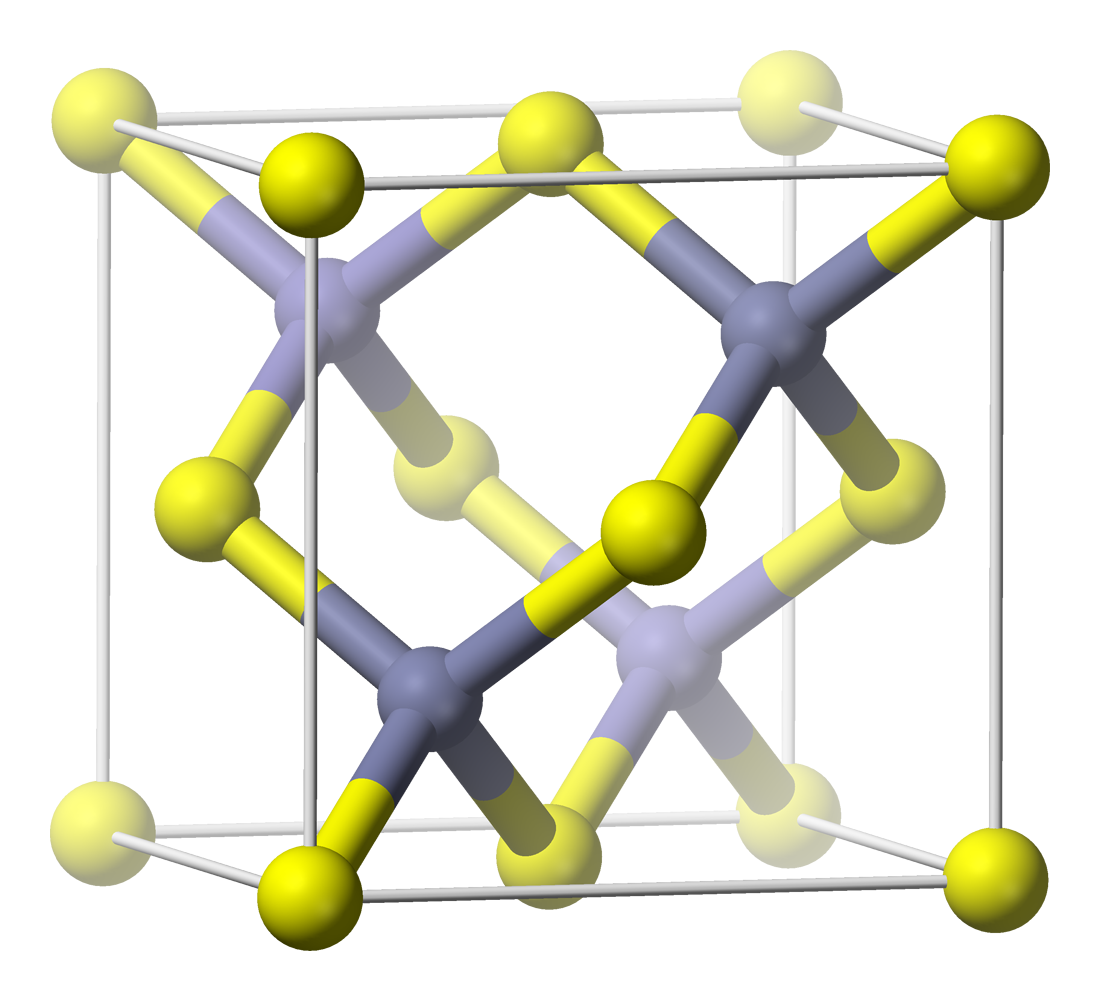
a unit cell of zincblende

Zinc oxide, ZnO, is the most important manufactured compound of zinc, with a wide variety of uses. It crystallizes with the Wurtzite structure. It is amphoteric, dissolving in acids to give the aqueous Zn^{2+} ion and in alkali to give the zincate (a.k.a. tetrahydroxozincate) ion, [Zn(OH)_{4}]^{2−}. Zinc hydroxide, Zn(OH)_{2} is also amphoteric.

Zinc sulfide, ZnS, crystallizes in two closely related structures, the zincblende crystal structure and the Wurtzite crystal structure, which are common structures of compounds with the formula MA. Both Zn and S are tetrahedrally coordinated by the other ion. A useful property of ZnS is its phosphorescence. The other chalcogenides, ZnSe and ZnTe, have applications in electronics and optics.

Of the four zinc halides, ZnF_{2} has the most ionic character, whereas the others, ZnCl_{2}, ZnBr_{2}, and ZnI_{2}, have relatively low melting points and are considered to have more covalent character. The pnictogenides Zn_{3}N_{2} (notable for its high melting point), Zn_{3}P_{2}, Zn_{3}As_{2} and Zn_{3}Sb_{2}, have various applications. Other binary compounds of zinc include zinc peroxide ZnO_{2}, zinc hydride ZnH_{2}, and zinc carbide ZnC_{2}.

=== Salts ===
Zinc nitrate Zn(NO_{3})_{2} (used as oxidizing agent), zinc chlorate Zn(ClO_{3})_{2}, zinc sulfate ZnSO_{4} (known as "white vitriol"), zinc phosphate Zn_{3}(PO_{4})_{2} (used as primer pigment), zinc molybdate ZnMoO_{4} (used as white pigment), zinc chromate ZnCrO_{4} (one of the few colored zinc compounds), zinc arsenite Zn(AsO_{2})_{2} (colorless powder) and zinc arsenate octahydrate Zn(AsO_{4})_{2}•8H_{2}O (white powder, also referred to as koettigite) are a few examples of other common inorganic compounds of zinc. The latter two compounds are both used in insecticides and wood preservatives. One of the simplest examples of an organic compound of zinc is zinc acetate Zn(O_{2}CCH_{3})_{2}, which has several medicinal applications. Zinc salts are usually fully dissociated in aqueous solution. Exceptions occur when the anion can form a complex, such as in the case of zinc sulfate, where the complex [Zn(H_{2}O)_{n}(SO_{4}] may be formed, (log K = ca. 2.5).

== Complexes ==
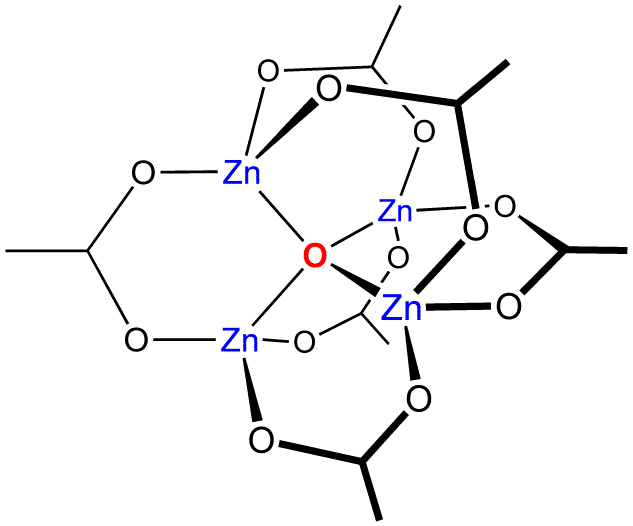
Structure of solid basic zinc acetate, [Zn_{4}(μ^{4}-O)(η^{2}-O_{2}CCH_{3})_{6}]

The most common structure of zinc complexes is tetrahedral. Nevertheless, octahedral complexes comparable to those of the earlier transition metals are not rare. Zn^{2+} is a class A acceptor in the classification of Ahrland, Chatt and Davies, and so forms stronger complexes with the first-row donor atoms oxygen or nitrogen than with second-row sulfur or phosphorus. In terms of HSAB theory Zn^{2+} is a hard acid.

In aqueous solution an octahedral complex, [Zn(H_{2}O)_{6}]^{2+} is the predominant species. Aqueous solutions of zinc salts are mildly acidic because the aqua-ion is subject to hydrolysis with a pK_{a} of around 9, depending on conditions.

[Zn(H_{2}O)_{6}]^{2+} ⇌ [Zn(H_{2}O)_{5}(OH)]^{+} + H^{+}

Hydrolysis explains why basic salts such as basic zinc acetate and basic zinc carbonate, Zn_{3}(OH)_{4}(CO_{3})•H_{2}O are easy to obtain. The reason for the hydrolysis is the high electrical charge density on the zinc ion, which pulls electrons away from an OH bond of a coordinated water molecule and releases a hydrogen ion. The polarizing effect of Zn^{2+} is part of the reason why zinc is found in enzymes such as carbonic anhydrase.

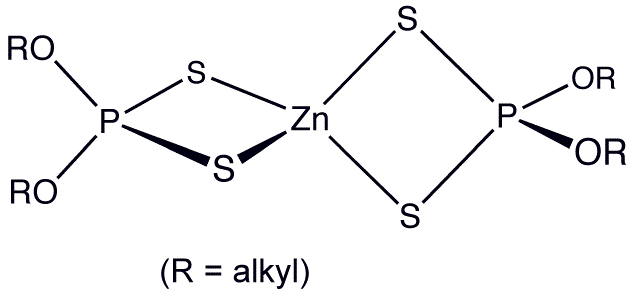
Structure of a monomeric zinc dialkyldithiophosphate

No fluoro complexes are known, but complexes with the other halides and with pseudohalides, [ZnX_{3}]^{−} and [ZnX_{4}]^{2−} can be prepared. The case of the thiocyanate complex illustrates the class A character of the zinc ion as it is the N-bonded isomer, [Zn(NCS)_{4}]^{2−}in contrast to [Cd(SCN)_{4}]^{2−} which is S-bonded. Being a class-A acceptor does not preclude the formation of complexes with sulfur donors, as is shown by zinc dithiophosphate and the zinc finger complex (below).

The zinc acetylacetonate complex, Zn(acac)_{2} is interesting. As the ligand is bidentate a tetrahedral structure might be expected. However, the compound is in fact a trimer, Zn_{3}(acac)_{6} in which each Zn ion is coordinated by five oxygen atoms in a distorted trigonal bipyramidal structure. Other 5-coordinate structures can be designed by choosing ligands which have specific stereochemical requirements. For example, terpyridine, which is a tridentate ligand forms the complex [Zn(terpy)Cl_{2}]. Another example would involve a tripodal ligand such as Tris(2-aminoethyl)amine. Square pyramidal 5-coordinate Zinc is found in Tetra(4-pyridyl)porphinatomonopyridinezinc(II) Solution studies of other 5-coordinate Zinc porphyrins have been reported. The compound zinc cyanide, Zn(CN)_{2}, is not 2-coordinate. It adopts a polymeric structure consisting of tetrahedral zinc centres linked by bridging cyanide ligands. The cyanide group shows head to tail disorder with any zinc atom having between 1 and 4 carbon atom neighbours and the remaining being nitrogen atoms. These two examples illustrate the difficulty of sometimes relating structure to stoichiometry.

A coordination number of 2 occurs in zinc amide Zn(NR^{1}R^{2})_{2} (R^{1}=CMe_{3}, R^{2}=SiMe_{3}); the ligand is so bulky that there is not enough space for more than two of them.

== Bio-complexes ==
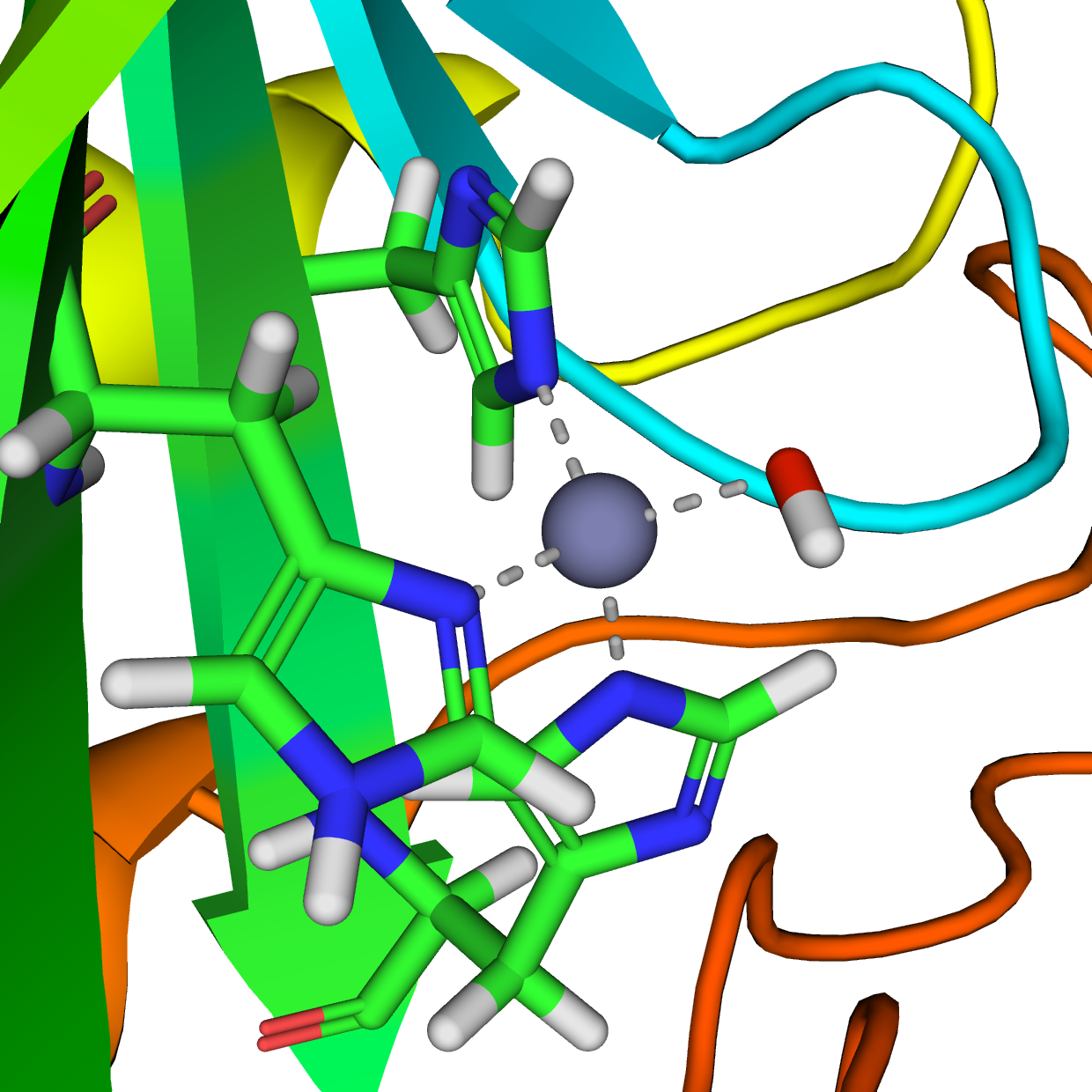
Carbonic anhydrase: an hydroxide group (red) is shown attached to zinc (gray)

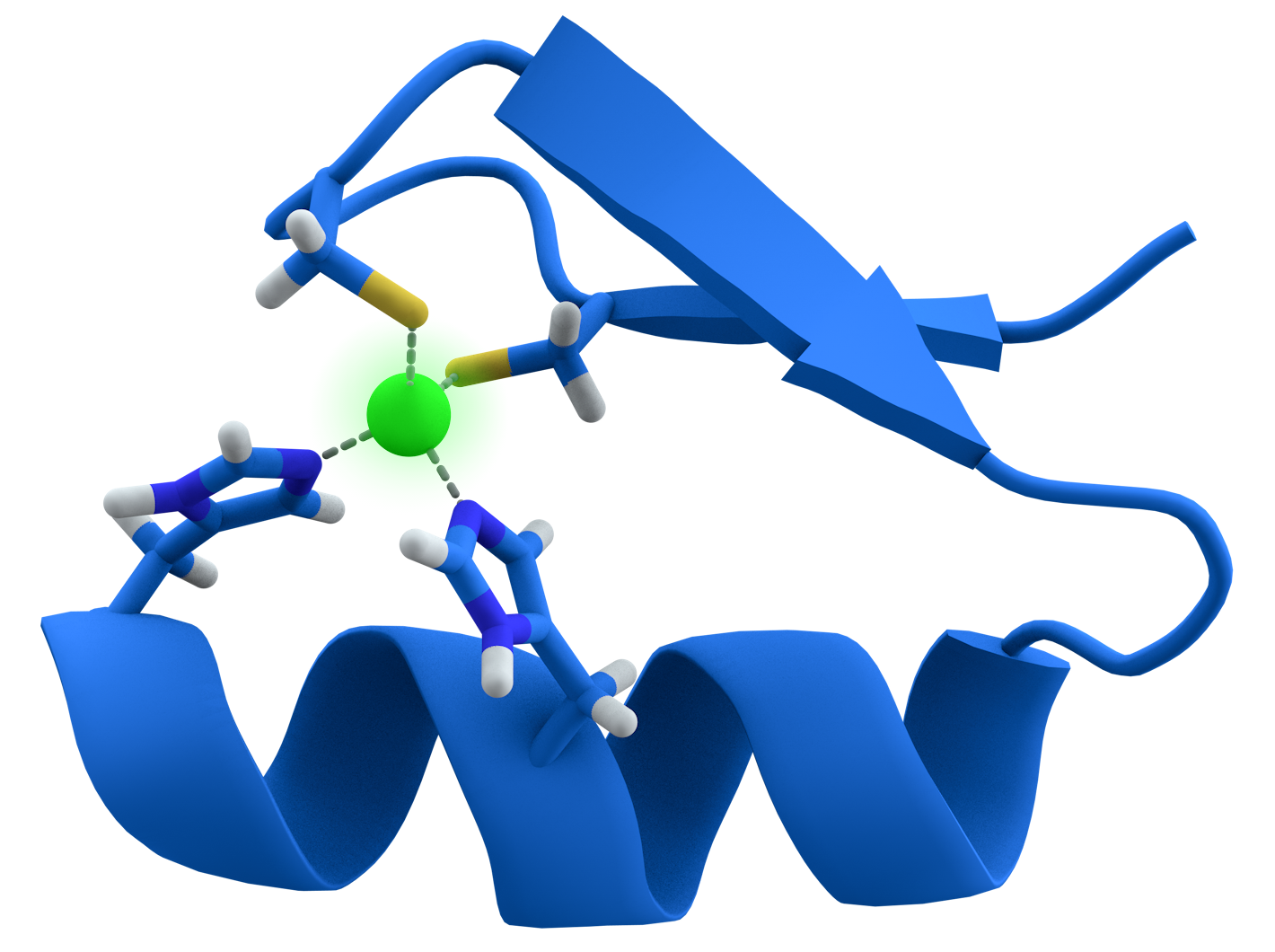
Zinc finger motif. The zinc ion (green) is coordinated by two histidine residues and two cysteine residues.

A very large number of metallo-enzymes contain zinc(II). Also many proteins contain zinc for structural reasons. The zinc ion is invariably 4-coordinate with at least three ligands that are amino-acid side-chains. The imidazole nitrogen of a histidine side-chain is a common ligand. The following are typical examples of the two kinds of zinc-protein complexes.

In the active site of resting carbonic anhydrase a zinc ion is coordinated by three histidine residues. The fourth position is occupied by a water molecule, which is strongly polarized as in hydrolysis (see above). When carbon dioxide enters the active site, it subject to nucleophilic attack by the oxygen atom which carries a partial negative charge, or indeed a full negative charge if the water molecule is dissociated. The CO_{2} is rapidly converted into a bicarbonate ion.

[(-hys)_{3}Zn(H_{2}O)]^{2+} + CO_{2} → [(-hys)_{3}Zn]^{2+} + HCO_{3}^{−} + H^{+}

Some peptidases, such as glutamate carboxypeptidase II are thought to act in a similar way, with the zinc ion promoting the formation of a nucleophilic reagent.

The zinc finger motif is a rigid substructure in a protein which facilitates the binding of the protein to another molecule such as DNA. In this case all four coordination positions are occupied by the histidine and cysteine residues. The tetrahedral geometry around the zinc ion constrains an α helix fragment and an antiparallel β sheet fragment to a particular orientation with respect to each other.

The magnesium ion, which has a higher concentration in biological fluids, cannot perform these functions because its complexes are much weaker than those of zinc.

== Organometallic compounds ==
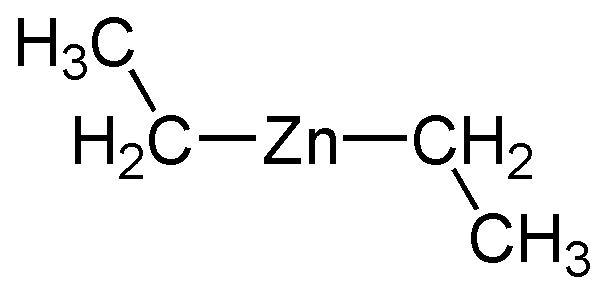
Diethylzinc

Organozinc compounds contain zinc—carbon covalent bonds. Diethylzinc ((C_{2}H_{5})_{2}Zn) was first reported in 1848. It was made by reaction of zinc and ethyl iodide and is the first compound known to contain a metal—carbon sigma bond. For a long time it was a mystery why copper(II) did not form an analogous compound. It was not until the 1980s that the reason was found: the zinc compound does not undergo the beta-hydride elimination reaction whereas the compound of the transition metal copper does so. Alkyl and aryl zinc compounds are contain the linear C—Zn—C motif. Because the zinc centre is coordinatively unsaturated, the compounds are powerful electrophiles. In fact the low-molecular weight compounds will ignite spontaneously on contact with air and are immediately destroyed by reaction with water molecules. The use of zinc alkyls has been largely superseded by the use of the more easily handled Grignard reagents. This demonstrates yet another connection between the chemistries of zinc and magnesium.

Zinc cyanide, Zn(CN)_{2}, is used as a catalyst in some organic reactions.

Organometallic compounds of zinc(I) contain M—M bonds. Decamethyldizincocene is now known.

== See also ==
- Cadmium zinc telluride
- Mercury cadmium telluride
- Zinc gluconate
- Zinc pyrithione
- Zinc ricinoleate
- Zinc stearate
- Zinc pest
