= Propargyl bromide =

Chemical compound

Names
- Preferred IUPAC name 3-Bromoprop-1-yne
- Other names 3-Bromo-1-propyne; Bromopropyne; 1-Brom-2-propin; 1-Bromo-2-propyne gamma-Bromoallylene; 2-Propynyl bromide Propargyl bromide Propynyl bromide

Identifiers
| CAS Number | 106-96-7 |
| 3D model (JSmol) | Interactive image |
| ChemSpider | 7554 |
| ECHA InfoCard | 100.003.135 |
| PubChem CID | 7842 |
| UNII | F3H7ZXK9ZU |
| CompTox Dashboard (EPA) | DTXSID3042340 |
- InChI: InChI=1S/C3H3Br/c1-2-3-4/h1H,3H2
- SMILES: BrCC#C

Properties
| Chemical formula | C_{3}H_{3}Br |
| Molar mass | 118.961 g·mol^{−1} |
| Appearance | colourless liquid |
| Density | 1.57 g/mL (20 °C) |
| Melting point | −61.1 °C (−78.0 °F; 212.1 K) |
| Boiling point | 89 °C (192 °F; 362 K) |
| Solubility in water | insoluble |
| Solubility | Soluble in organic solvents |
| log P | 1.179 |
| Vapor pressure | 72 mbar (20 °C) |

Hazards
- Occupational safety and health (OHS/OSH)
| Main hazards | Highly Flammable, Toxic, Corrosive |
| NFPA 704 (fire diamond) | 3 3 4 |
| Flash point | 18 °C (64 °F; 291 K) |
| Autoignition temperature | 324 °C (615 °F; 597 K) |
- Except where otherwise noted, data are given for materials in their standard state (at 25 °C [77 °F], 100 kPa). Infobox references

Propargyl bromide, also known as 3-bromo-prop-1-yne, is an organic compound with the chemical formula HC≡CCH_{2}Br. A colorless liquid, it is a halogenated organic compound consisting of propyne with a bromine substituent on the methyl group. It has a lachrymatory effect, like related compounds. The compound is used as a reagent in organic synthesis.

== Applications and production ==
Propargyl bromide may be produced by the treatment of propargyl alcohol with phosphorus tribromide.

== Reactions ==
Propargyl bromide is an alkylating agent. For example, it reacts with dimethylsulfide, it reacts to give the sulfonium salt:

HCCCH_{2}Br + S(CH_{3})_{2} → [HCCCH_{2}S(CH_{3})_{2}]Br

It alkylates even weakly basic amines such as aniline.

Aldehydes react with propargyl bromide in a Barbier-type reaction to yield alkynyl alcohols:

At low temperatures, upon treatment with magnesium, propargyl bromide gives the Grignard reagent formally derived from allenyl bromide, i.e., CH_{2}=C=CHMgBr, which is more stable than, and rapidly interconverts with, its propargyl counterpart. Small amounts of ZnBr_{2} or HgCl_{2} catalyst must be added to enable formation of the allenyl Grignard to outcompete its isomerization to CH_{3}−C≡CMgBr.

Propargyl bromide and its ether derivatives participate in azide-based click reactions.

== Safety ==
Propargyl bromide is a lachrymator and an alkylating agent, This liquid acetylenic endothermic compound may be decomposed by mild shock, and when heated under confinement, it decomposes with explosive violence and may detonate. Addition of 20—30 wt% of toluene makes propargyl bromide insensitive in laboratory impact and confinement tests.

== See also ==
- Propargyl
- Propargyl chloride
- Propargyl alcohol
- Allyl bromide
