= Propargyl chloride =

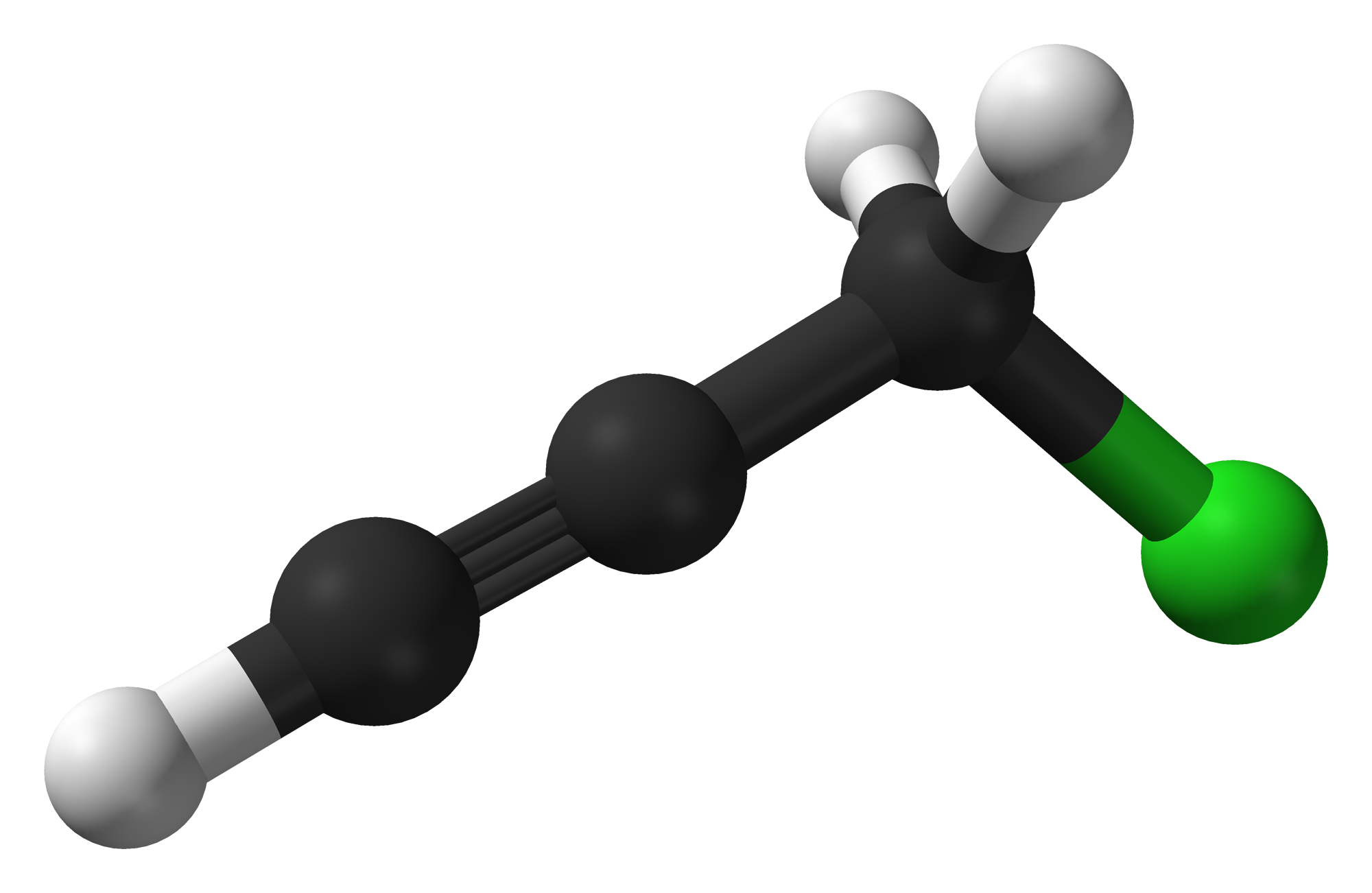

Names
- Preferred IUPAC name 3-Chloroprop-1-yne
- Other names Propargyl chloride, 3-Chloropropyne, 1-Chloro-2-propyne, 2-Propynyl chloride, Gamma-Chloroallylene, UN 2345

Identifiers
CAS Number	624-65-7
3D model (JSmol)	Interactive image
ChemSpider	21112738
ECHA InfoCard	100.009.870
EC Number	210-856-9
PubChem CID	12221
UNII	3M62YFL252
CompTox Dashboard (EPA)	DTXSID4060789
- InChI: InChI=1S/C3H3Cl/c1-2-3-4/h1H,3H2 Key: LJZPPWWHKPGCHS-UHFFFAOYSA-N; InChI=1/C3H3Cl/c1-2-3-4/h1H,3H2 Key: LJZPPWWHKPGCHS-UHFFFAOYAR
- SMILES: C#CCCl

Properties
Chemical formula	C_{3}H_{3}Cl
Molar mass	74.51 g·mol^{−1}
Appearance	colorless liquid
Density	1.0306 g/cm^{3}
Melting point	−78 °C (−108 °F; 195 K)
Boiling point	57 °C (135 °F; 330 K)
Solubility in water	Insoluble

Hazards
- GHS labelling
Pictograms	(GHS02: Flammable) (GHS05: Corrosive) (GHS06: Toxic)
Signal word	Danger
Hazard statements	H225, H301, H314, H330, H331, H335, H412
Precautionary statements	P210, P233, P240, P241, P242, P243, P260, P264, P270, P271, P273, P280, P284, P301+P310, P301+P330+P331, P302+P352, P303+P361+P353, P304+P340, P305+P351+P338, P310, P311, P312, P320, P321, P330, P361, P363, P370+P378, P403+P233, P403+P235, P405, P501
NFPA 704 (fire diamond)	3 3 1
Flash point	18 °C (64 °F; 291 K)
- Except where otherwise noted, data are given for materials in their standard state (at 25 °C [77 °F], 100 kPa). verify (what is ?) Infobox references

Propargyl chloride is an organic compound with the formula HC_{2}CH_{2}Cl. It is a colorless liquid and a lacrymator. It is an alkylating agent that is used in organic synthesis.

Although propargyl bromide is the more common choice of alkylating agent, propargyl chloride was used in the synthesis of flumioxazin.

== See also ==
- Allyl chloride
- Propargyl
- Propargyl alcohol
