= Propynyl group =

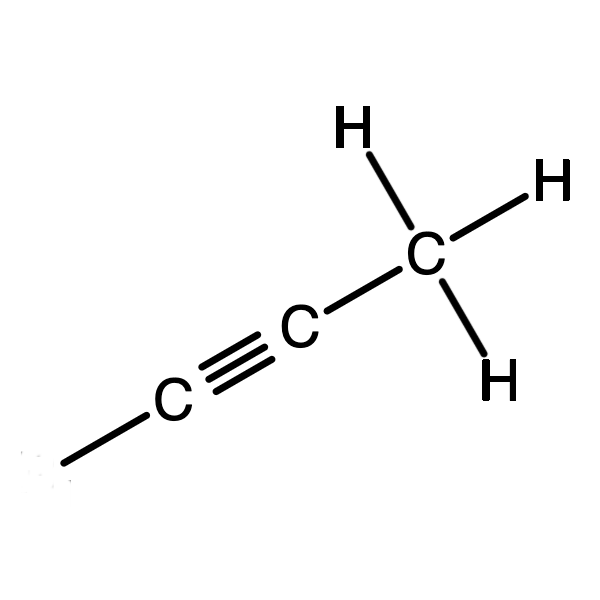
Chemical structure of the 1-propynyl group

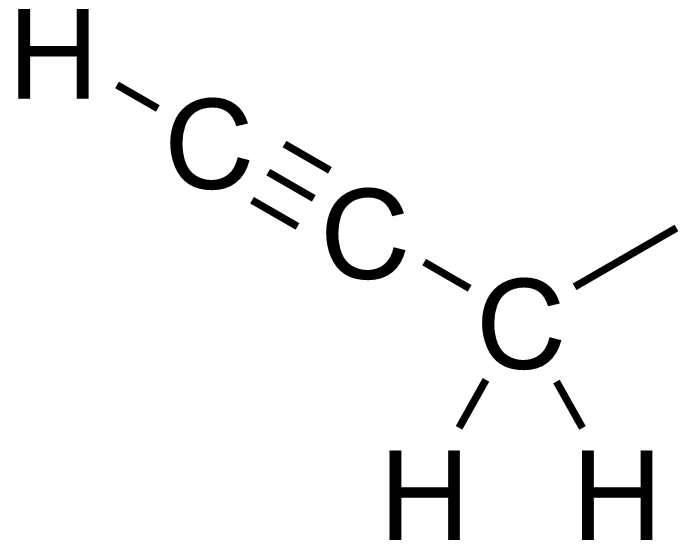
Chemical structure of the 2-propynyl (propargyl) group.

In organic chemistry, a propynyl group is a propyl bearing a triple bond.

- The 1-propynyl group has the structure CH_{3}-C≡C–R.
- The 2-propynyl group is also known as a propargyl group, and has the structure HC≡C−CH_{2}–R.
