= Propiolic acid =

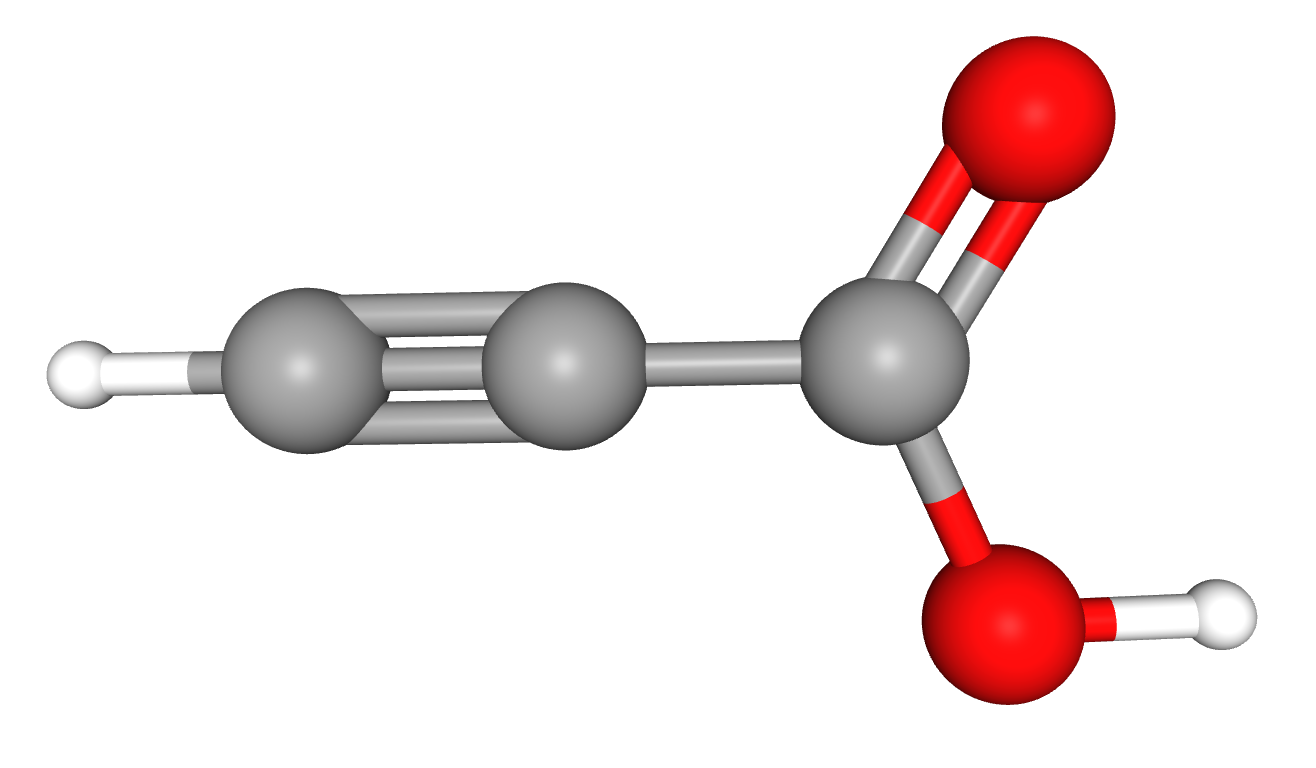

Names
- Preferred IUPAC name Prop-2-ynoic acid
- Other names Propiolic acid Acetylene carboxylic acid Propargylic acid Acetylene mono-carboxylic acid

Identifiers
CAS Number	471-25-0
3D model (JSmol)	Interactive image
Beilstein Reference	878176
ChEBI	CHEBI:33199
ChEMBL	ChEMBL1213530
ChemSpider	9706
ECHA InfoCard	100.006.763
EC Number	207-437-8
Gmelin Reference	81893
KEGG	C00804
MeSH	C011537
PubChem CID	10110
UNII	P2QW39G9LZ
CompTox Dashboard (EPA)	DTXSID6060050
- InChI: InChI=1S/C3H2O2/c1-2-3(4)5/h1H,(H,4,5) Key: UORVCLMRJXCDCP-UHFFFAOYSA-N; InChI=1/C3H2O2/c1-2-3(4)5/h1H,(H,4,5) Key: UORVCLMRJXCDCP-UHFFFAOYAX
- SMILES: C#CC(=O)O

Properties
Chemical formula	C_{3}H_{2}O_{2}
Molar mass	70.047 g·mol^{−1}
Density	1.1325 g/cm^{3}
Melting point	9 °C (48 °F; 282 K)
Boiling point	144 °C (291 °F; 417 K) (decomposes)
Acidity (pK_{a})	pk_{a} = 1.89

Hazards
- GHS labelling
Pictograms	(GHS02: Flammable) (GHS06: Toxic) (GHS07: Exclamation mark)
Signal word	Danger
Hazard statements	H226, H301, H310, H315, H335
Precautionary statements	P210, P233, P240, P241, P242, P243, P261, P262, P264, P270, P271, P280, P301+P310, P302+P350, P302+P352, P303+P361+P353, P304+P340, P310, P312, P321, P322, P330, P332+P313, P361, P362, P363, P370+P378, P403+P233, P403+P235, P405, P501
Safety data sheet (SDS)	External MSDS
- Except where otherwise noted, data are given for materials in their standard state (at 25 °C [77 °F], 100 kPa). verify (what is ?) Infobox references

Propiolic acid is the organic compound with the formula HC_{2}CO_{2}H. It is the simplest acetylenic carboxylic acid. It is a colourless liquid that crystallises to give silky crystals. Near its boiling point, it decomposes.

It is soluble in water and possesses an odor like that of acetic acid.

== Preparation ==
It is prepared commercially by oxidizing propargyl alcohol at a lead electrode. It can also be prepared by decarboxylation of acetylenedicarboxylic acid.

== Reactions and applications ==
Exposure to sunlight converts it into trimesic acid (benzene-1,3,5-tricarboxylic acid). It undergoes bromination to give dibromoacrylic acid. With hydrogen chloride it forms chloroacrylic acid. Its ethyl ester condenses with hydrazine to form pyrazolone.

It forms a characteristic explosive solid upon treatment to its aqueous solution with ammoniacal silver nitrate. An amorphous explosive precipitate forms with ammoniacal cuprous chloride.

== Propiolates ==
Propiolates are esters or salts of propiolic acid. Common examples include methyl propiolate and ethyl propiolate.

== See also ==
- Propargyl
- Propargyl alcohol
