= Methyl propiolate =

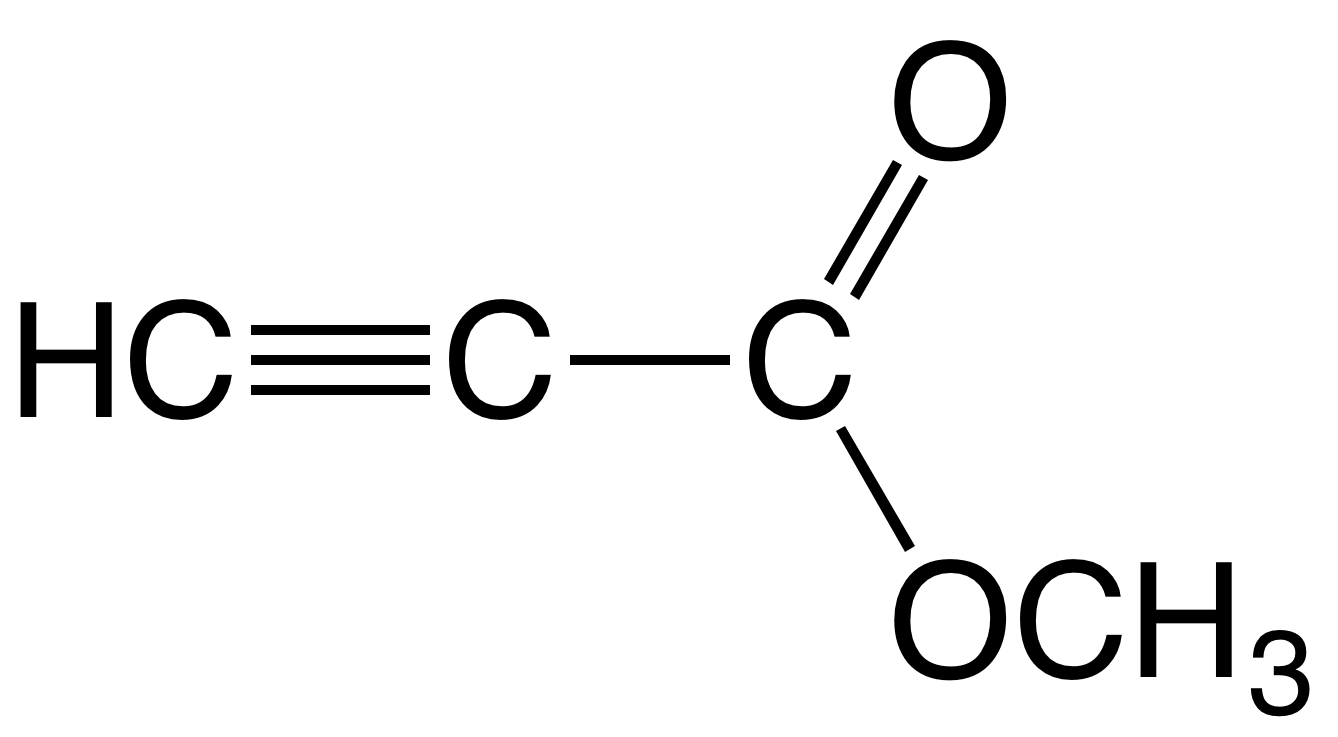

Names
- Preferred IUPAC name Methyl prop-2-ynoate
- Other names methyl propynoate methyl acetylenecarboxylate

Identifiers
CAS Number	922-67-8
3D model (JSmol)	Interactive image
Beilstein Reference	4-02-00-01688
ChemSpider	12948
ECHA InfoCard	100.011.894
EC Number	213-083-5
PubChem CID	13536
UNII	T88NXO102K
CompTox Dashboard (EPA)	DTXSID60238923
- InChI: InChI=1S/C4H4O2/c1-3-4(5)6-2/h1H,2H3 Key: IMAKHNTVDGLIRY-UHFFFAOYSA-N
- SMILES: COC(=O)C#C

Properties
Chemical formula	C_{4}H_{4}O_{2}
Molar mass	84.074 g·mol^{−1}
Appearance	colorless liquid
Density	0.945 g mL^{−1}
Boiling point	103–105 °C (217–221 °F; 376–378 K)
- Except where otherwise noted, data are given for materials in their standard state (at 25 °C [77 °F], 100 kPa). Infobox references

Methyl propiolate is an organic compound with the formula HC_{2}CO_{2}CH_{3}. It is the methyl ester of propiolic acid, the simplest acetylenic carboxylic acid. It is a colorless liquid that is miscible with organic solvents. The compound is a reagent and building block for the synthesis of other organic compounds, reactions that exploit the electrophilicity of the alkyne group. For example it is a potent dienophile. It has been widely evaluated as a precursor to heterocycles. including 1,3-dipolar cycloadditions.
