= Arens–van Dorp synthesis =

The Arens–van Dorp synthesis is a name reaction in organic chemistry. It describes the addition of lithiated ethoxyacetylenes to ketones to give propargyl alcohols, which can undergo further reaction to form α,β-unsaturated aldehydes, or esters. There is also a variation of this reaction called the Isler modification, where the acetylide anion is generated in situ from β-chlorovinyl ether using lithium amide.

The Isler modification
