= Decamethyldizincocene =

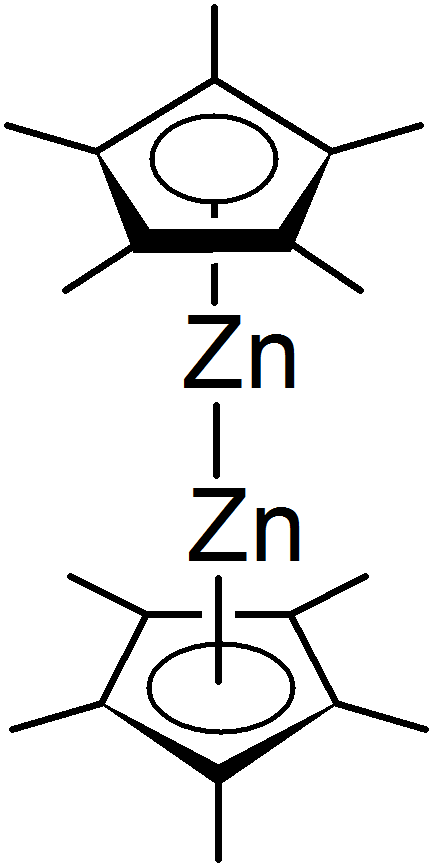

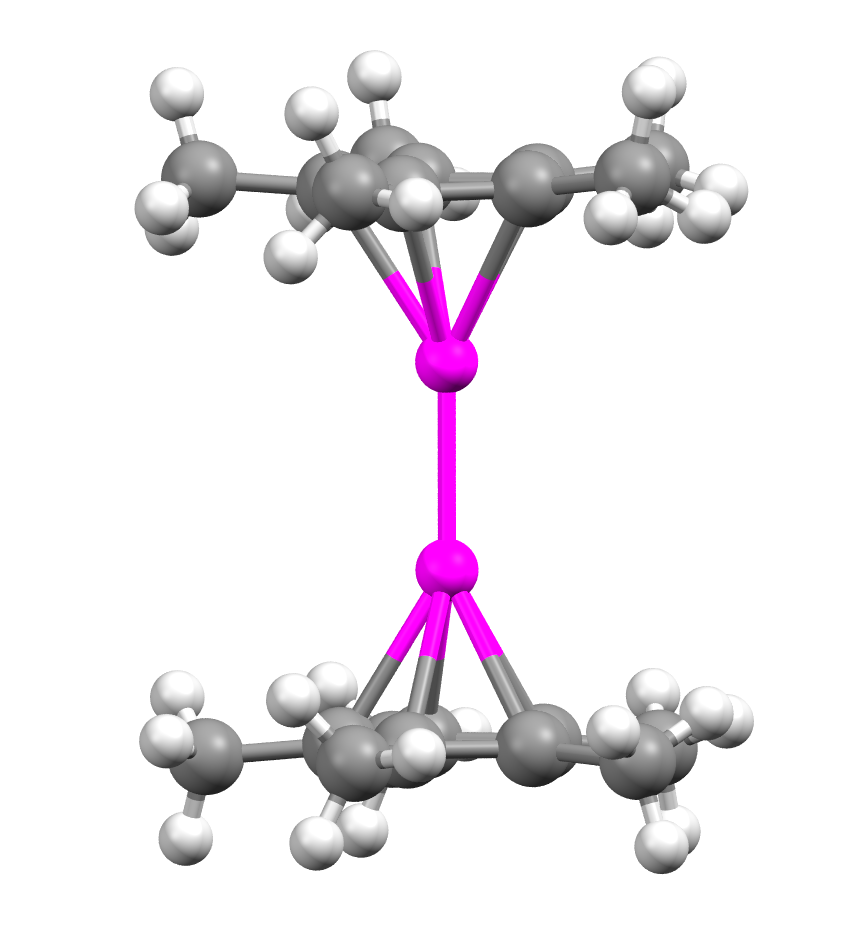

Identifiers
3D model (JSmol)	Interactive image
ChemSpider	9352165
PubChem CID	139063629
- InChI: InChI=1S/2C10H15.2Zn/c2*1-6-7(2)9(4)10(5)8(6)3;;/h2*1-5H3;;/q2*-1;2*+1 Key: FZXUROULDKYZME-UHFFFAOYSA-N
- SMILES: C[C-]1C(=C(C(=C1C)C)C)C.C[C-]1C(=C(C(=C1C)C)C)C.[Zn+].[Zn+]

Properties
Chemical formula	C_{20}H_{30}Zn_{2}
Molar mass	401.22 g·mol^{−1}
Appearance	colorless crystalline solid
Melting point	110 °C (230 °F; 383 K) (decomposes)
Solubility in water	Reacts
Solubility	soluble in diethyl ether, benzene, pentane, and tetrahydrofuran
- Except where otherwise noted, data are given for materials in their standard state (at 25 °C [77 °F], 100 kPa). verify (what is ?) Infobox references

Decamethyldizincocene is an organozinc compound with the formula [Zn_{2}(η^{5}–C_{5}Me_{5})_{2}]. It is the first and an unusual example of a compound with a Zn-Zn bond. Decamethyldizincocene is a colorless crystalline solid that burns spontaneously in the presence of oxygen and reacts with water. It is stable at room temperature and especially soluble in diethyl ether, benzene, pentane, or tetrahydrofuran.

== Synthesis ==
The ability of metals to form heteronuclear or homonuclear metal-metal bonds varies throughout the periodic table. Among the group 12 elements, mercury readily forms [M-M]^{2+} units whereas the elements cadmium and zinc form fewer examples of such species. Decamethyldizincocene was reported in 2004 by Carmona and coworkers as an unexpected product of the reaction between decamethylzincocene (Zn(C_{5}Me_{5})_{2}) and diethylzinc (ZnEt_{2}).

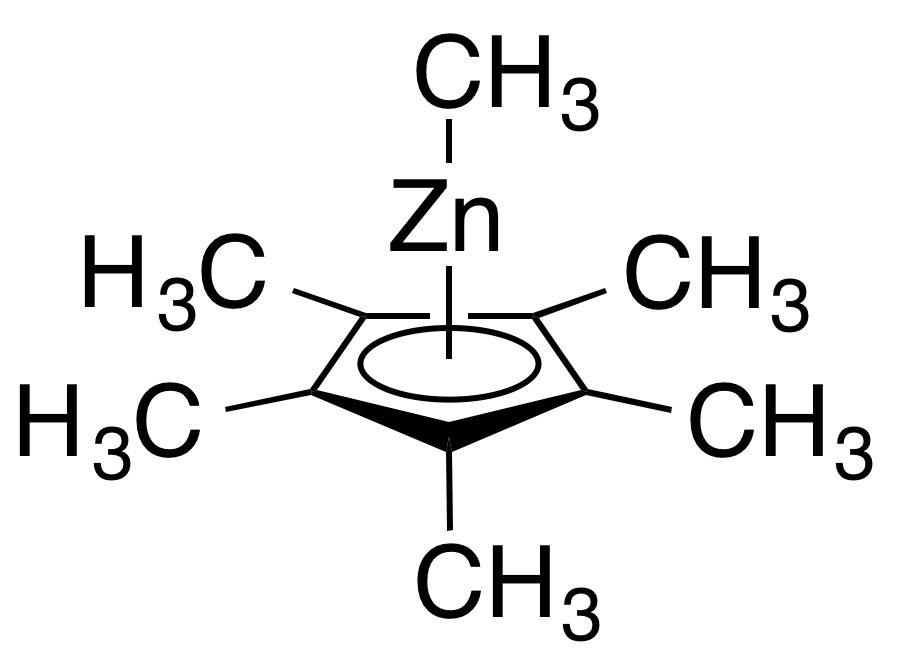
The half-sandwich compound [(η^{5}-C_{5}Me_{5})ZnMe

]

2 (η^{5}-C_{5}Me_{5})_{2}Zn + Et_{2}Zn → (η^{5}-C_{5}Me_{5})_{2}Zn_{2} + 2 (η^{5}-C_{5}Me_{5})ZnEt + hydrocarbon(s)

The analogous reaction of zincocene (Zn(C_{5}H_{5})_{2}) with diethylzinc gives (η^{5}-C_{5}H_{5})ZnEt. Therefore, the stabilizing effect of the methyl groups on the cyclopentadienyl rings is of great importance in the formation of decamethydizincocene. The use of ZnEt_{2} as a reactant is of particular significance.

The organozinc precursor is important. Diphenylzinc (Zn(C_{6}H_{5})_{2}), despite its lower solubility, can be utilized in place of ZnEt_{2}. On the other hand, ZnMe_{2} gives only the half-sandwich compound [(η^{5}-C_{5}Me_{5})ZnMe].

Both (η^{5}-C_{5}Me_{5})ZnEt and decamethyldizincocene are produced from the reaction between Zn(η^{5}-C_{5}Me_{5})_{2} and ZnEt_{2}. The relative amounts depend on reaction conditions, which can be optimized to favor one or the other. For instance, if this reaction is conducted in pentane at -40 °C, (η^{5}-C_{5}Me_{5})ZnEt is the sole product. Conversely, if the reaction is conducted in diethyl ether at -10 °C, (Zn_{2}(η^{5}-C_{5}Me_{5})_{2}) is the major product.

=== Unpredictability of synthesis ===
The formation of decamethyldizincocene is, however, rather unpredictable. Several duplications of this reaction (under conditions that favor the formation of decamethyldizincocene) have inexplicably led to the formation of only the half-sandwich complex (η^{5}-C_{5}Me_{5})ZnEt. The formation of the products (η^{5}-C_{5}Me_{5})ZnEt and Zn_{2}(η^{5}-C_{5}Me_{5})_{2} occur via separate, competitive reaction pathways and, therefore, the two products do not interconvert when left to react over extended periods of time.

The formation of the half-sandwich complex is believed to occur via hydrocarbyl-bridged intermediates. The reaction mechanism is, however, uncertain. Previously it was hypothesized that the creation of decamethyldizincocene occurred through the decomposition of diethylzinc, whose decomposition products would have had the capability of reducing decamethylzincocene to decamethyldizincocene. However, it is now believed that the formation of decamethyldizincocene occurs via a radical reaction involving the combination of two (η^{5}-C_{5}Me_{5})Zn^{•} radicals.

In a new more efficient and more general route to decamethyldizincocene, potassium hydride is used to reduce decamethylzincocene to decamethyldizincocene. Other reductants such as K, Na, or CaH_{2} may be used as well in the reduction of decamethylzincocene to decamethyldizincocene.

== Properties ==
Decamethyldizincocene does not react with Lewis bases such PMe_{3}, PPh_{3}, NEt_{3}, or pyridine nor does it react with H_{2}, CO_{2}, or CO. This compound appears to be indefinitely stable at room temperature (however storage at -20 °C is advised) and sublimes near 70 °C under vacuum.

In the presence of water or tert-butyl alcohol, this compound disproportionates to zinc metal and zinc hydroxide or zinc tert-butoxide.

== Structure ==
Various methods have been employed in order to determine the structure of decamethyldizincocene, including x-ray diffraction, ^{1}H NMR, and mass spectrometry. Through X-ray diffraction methods it has been found that the zinc atoms are sandwiched between two parallel C_{5}Me_{5} rings whose planes are perpendicular to the metal-metal bond axis. The separation between the two ring planes is approximately 6.40 Å. The C_{5}Me_{5} rings are in an eclipsed conformation with the methyl substituents bent slightly outward (away from the central metal atoms) at angles of 3 to 6 degrees.

In mononuclear metallocenes the bending of substituents attached to the rings serves to prevent steric hindrance; however, the radius of a methyl group is only 2.0 Å and therefore the bending in decamethyldizincocene does not serve this purpose since the distance between the two rings is much greater than this value. It is believed that in the case of decamethyldizincocene the bending of the methyl groups attached to the cyclopentadienyl ligands is preferential because it concentrates the electron density away from the central, positively charged metal atoms. The separation between each Zn atom and the center of the cyclopentadienyl ring attached to it is approximately 2.04 Å and the Zn-C(ring) distances range from 2.27 to 2.30 Å. The Zn-Zn bond distance is 2.305 Å, which indicates considerably strong bonding between the two zinc atoms. This can be compared to the known [Hg-Hg]^{2+} bond length of 2.5 to 2.7 Å. Two separate types of structures for dimetallocenes have been hypothesized including a coaxial structure (which is the structure of decamethyldizincocene) and a perpendicular structure in which the metal-metal bond axis is parallel to the plane of the cyclopentadienyl ligands (which is predicted to be the structure for dicuprocenes). The compound addressed in this paper is essentially linear with Zn-Zn bond angles of approximately 177°:

=== Absence of bridging ligands ===
^{1}H NMR and mass spectrometry studies have been useful in proving that decamethyldizincocene does not include bridging ligands. This study is important considering that the complex previously hypothesized to be Co_{2}(η^{5}-C_{5}Me_{5})_{2} was later found using ^{1}H NMR and mass spectrometry data to be supported by three bridging hydrogens. The ^{1}H NMR of decamethyldizincocene shows only one signal at δ 2.02 due to the hydrogens attached to the methyl groups on the cyclopentadienyl ligands.

=== Electronic structure and bonding characteristics ===
Decamethyldizincocene has an accumulation of electron density between the two zinc atoms, which indicates bonding. This bond has a predicted dissociation energy of 62 kcal·mol^{−1} and is approximately as strong as those found among metal-halide bonds. NBO (Natural Bond Order) analysis has indicated that sigma bonding occurs between the 4s orbitals of the central metal atoms with a bonding orbital occupancy of 1.9445.9 Using fragment molecular orbital analysis (FMOA) it has been found that there is one principal molecular orbital that participates in the Zn-Zn bonding with approximately 88% bonding character concentrated between the Zn atoms.
