= Zinc triflate =

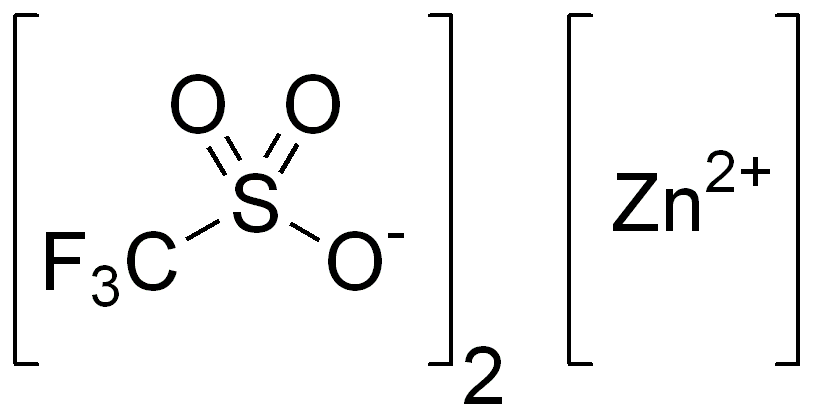

Names
- IUPAC name zinc trifluoromethanesulfonate

Identifiers
CAS Number	54010-75-2
3D model (JSmol)	Interactive image
ChemSpider	94493
ECHA InfoCard	100.053.548
PubChem CID	104671
CompTox Dashboard (EPA)	DTXSID7068899
- InChI: InChI=1S/2CHF3O3S.Zn/c2*2-1(3,4)8(5,6)7;/h2*(H,5,6,7);/q;;+2/p-2 Key: CITILBVTAYEWKR-UHFFFAOYSA-L; InChI=1/2CHF3O3S.Zn/c2*2-1(3,4)8(5,6)7;/h2*(H,5,6,7);/q;;+2/p-2 Key: CITILBVTAYEWKR-NUQVWONBAZ
- SMILES: [Zn+2].FC(F)(F)S([O-])(=O)=O.FC(F)(F)S([O-])(=O)=O

Properties
Chemical formula	C_{2}F_{6}O_{6}S_{2}Zn
Molar mass	363.51 g·mol^{−1}
Appearance	White powder
- Except where otherwise noted, data are given for materials in their standard state (at 25 °C [77 °F], 100 kPa). verify (what is ?) Infobox references

Zinc trifluoromethanesulfonate or zinc triflate is the zinc salt of trifluoromethanesulfonic acid. It is commonly used as a Lewis acid catalyst, e.g. in silylations.

A white powder, zinc triflate is commercially available, though some workers have experienced inconsistent results with zinc triflate from different sources. If desired, it may be prepared from reacting trifluoromethanesulfonic acid with zinc metal in acetonitrile, or with zinc carbonate in methanol:

Zn + 2 HOTf → Zn(OTf)_{2} + H_{2}
ZnCO_{3} + 2 HOTf → Zn(OTf)_{2} + H_{2}O + CO_{2} (OTf = CF_{3}SO_{3})
