= Ethyl propiolate =

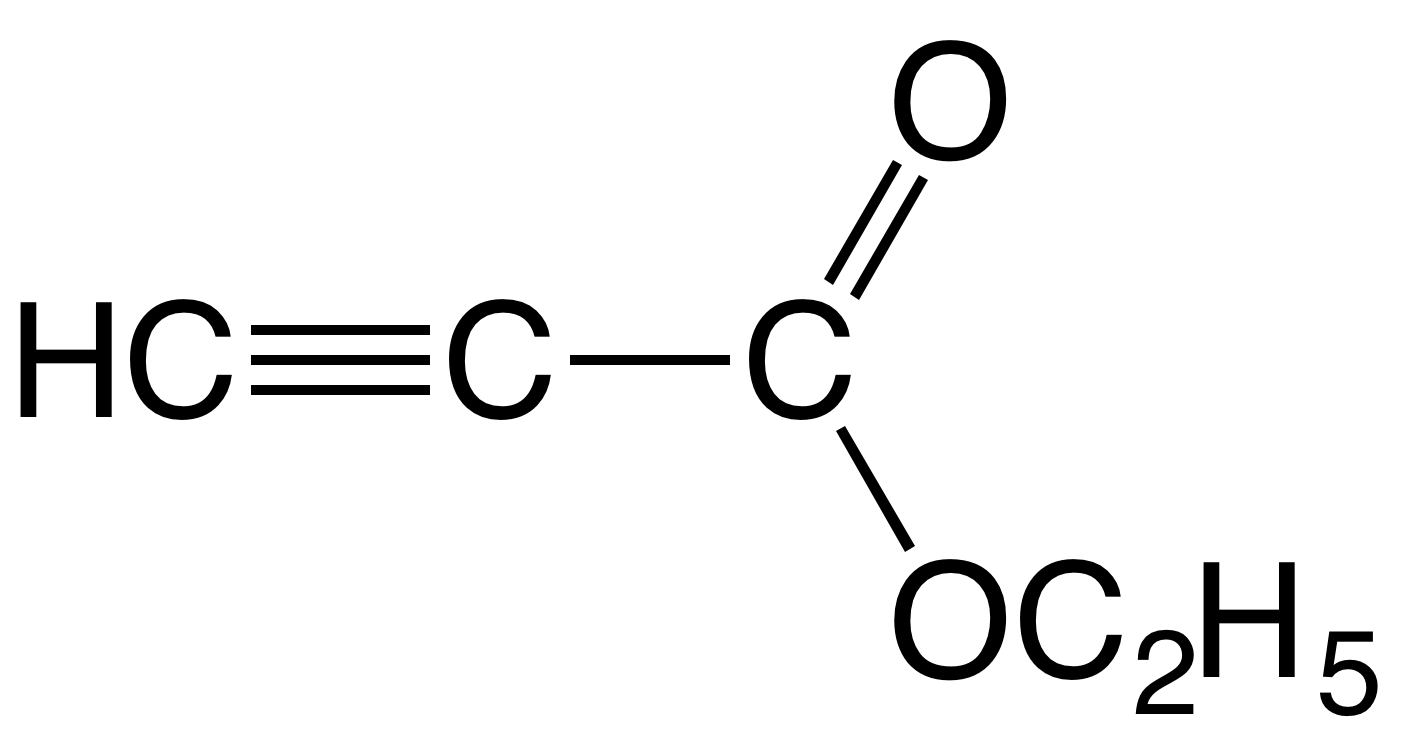

Names
- Preferred IUPAC name Ethyl prop-2-ynoate
- Other names Ethyl propynoate Ethyl acetylenecarboxylate

Identifiers
CAS Number	623-47-2
3D model (JSmol)	Interactive image
Beilstein Reference	878250
ChemSpider	11682
ECHA InfoCard	100.009.815
EC Number	210-795-8
PubChem CID	12182
UNII	W235G5U52S
CompTox Dashboard (EPA)	DTXSID80211359
- InChI: InChI=1S/C5H6O2/c1-3-5(6)7-4-2/h1H,4H2,2H3 Key: FMVJYQGSRWVMQV-UHFFFAOYSA-N
- SMILES: CCOC(=O)C#C

Properties
Chemical formula	C_{5}H_{6}O_{2}
Molar mass	98.101 g·mol^{−1}
Appearance	colorless liquid
Density	0.968 g/mL
Boiling point	120 °C (248 °F; 393 K)
- Except where otherwise noted, data are given for materials in their standard state (at 25 °C [77 °F], 100 kPa). Infobox references

Ethyl propiolate is an organic compound with the formula HC_{2}CO_{2}C_{2}H_{5}. It is the ethyl ester of propiolic acid, the simplest acetylenic carboxylic acid. It is a colorless liquid that is miscible with organic solvents. The compound is a reagent and building block for the synthesis of other organic compounds, reactions that exploit the electrophilicity of the alkyne group.
