= Furaneol =

Names
- IUPAC name 4-Hydroxy-2,5-dimethyl-3-furanone
- Other names: 4-Hydroxy-2,5-dimethyl-3(2H)-furanone; Alletone; Pineapple ketone; Strawberry furanone; Dimethylhydroxy furanone

Identifiers
CAS Number	3658-77-3; 131222-82-7 (R)-(+); 131222-81-6 (S)-(−)
3D model (JSmol)	Interactive image
Abbreviations	DMHF
ChEBI	CHEBI:76247
ChemSpider	18218
ECHA InfoCard	100.020.826
PubChem CID	19309
UNII	20PI8YZP7A
CompTox Dashboard (EPA)	DTXSID0041517
- InChI: InChI=1S/C6H8O3/c1-3-5(7)6(8)4(2)9-3/h3,8H,1-2H3 Key: INAXVXBDKKUCGI-UHFFFAOYSA-N; InChI=1/C6H8O3/c1-3-5(7)6(8)4(2)9-3/h3,8H,1-2H3 Key: INAXVXBDKKUCGI-UHFFFAOYAH
- SMILES: O=C1C(\O)=C(/OC1C)C

Properties
Chemical formula	C_{6}H_{8}O_{3}
Molar mass	128.127 g·mol^{−1}
Melting point	73 to 77 °C (163 to 171 °F; 346 to 350 K)
- Except where otherwise noted, data are given for materials in their standard state (at 25 °C [77 °F], 100 kPa). verify (what is ?) Infobox references

Furaneol, or strawberry furanone, is an organic compound used in the flavor, perfume and cosmetics industry. It is formally a derivative of furan. It is a white or colorless solid that is soluble in water and organic solvents.

== Odor and occurrence ==
Although possessed of a caramel-like odor at high concentrations, it exhibits a sweet strawberry aroma when dilute. It is found in strawberries and a variety of other fruits and it is partly responsible for the smell of fresh pineapple. It is also an important component of the odours of buckwheat, and tomato. Furaneol accumulation during ripening has been observed in strawberries and can reach a high concentration of 37 μg/g.

=== Furaneol acetate ===
The acetate ester of furaneol, also known as caramel acetate and strawberry acetate, is also popular with flavorists to achieve a fatty toffee taste and it is used in traces in perfumery to add a sweet gourmand note.

== Stereoisomerism ==
Furaneol has two enantiomers, (R)-(+)-furaneol and (S)-(−)-furaneol. The (R)-form is mainly responsible for the smell.

Stereoisomers of furaneol
(S)-configuration	(R)-configuration

== Biosynthesis ==
It is one of several products from the dehydration of glucose. Its immediate biosynthetic precursor is the glucoside, derived from dehydration of sucrose.
