= Propargyl group =

Chemical group (–CH2C≡CH)

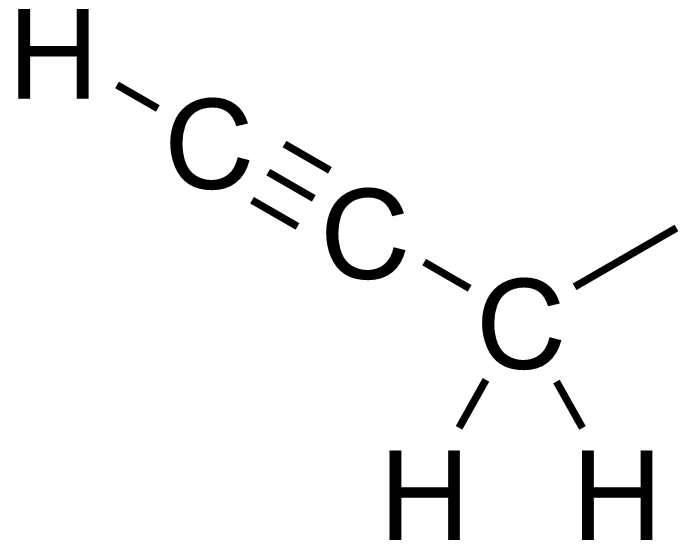
Chemical structure of the propargyl group.

In organic chemistry, the propargyl group is a functional group of 2-propynyl with the structure HC≡C−CH_{2}−. It is an alkynyl group derived from propyne (HC≡C−CH_{3}).

The term propargylic refers to a saturated position (sp^{3}-hybridized) on a molecular framework next to an alkynyl group. The name comes from mix of propene and argentum, which refers to the typical reaction of the terminal alkynes with silver salts.

The term homopropargylic designates in the same manner

- a saturated position on a molecular framework next to a propargylic group and thus two bonds from an alkyne moiety.
- a 3-butynyl fragment, HC≡C−CH_{2}CH_{2}−, or substituted homologue.

== See also ==
- Alkenyl groups
  - Allyl
  - Vinyl group
- Ethynyl
- Propargyl chloride
- Propargyl alcohol
- Propargyl bromide
- Propiolic acid
