= Propargyl alcohol =

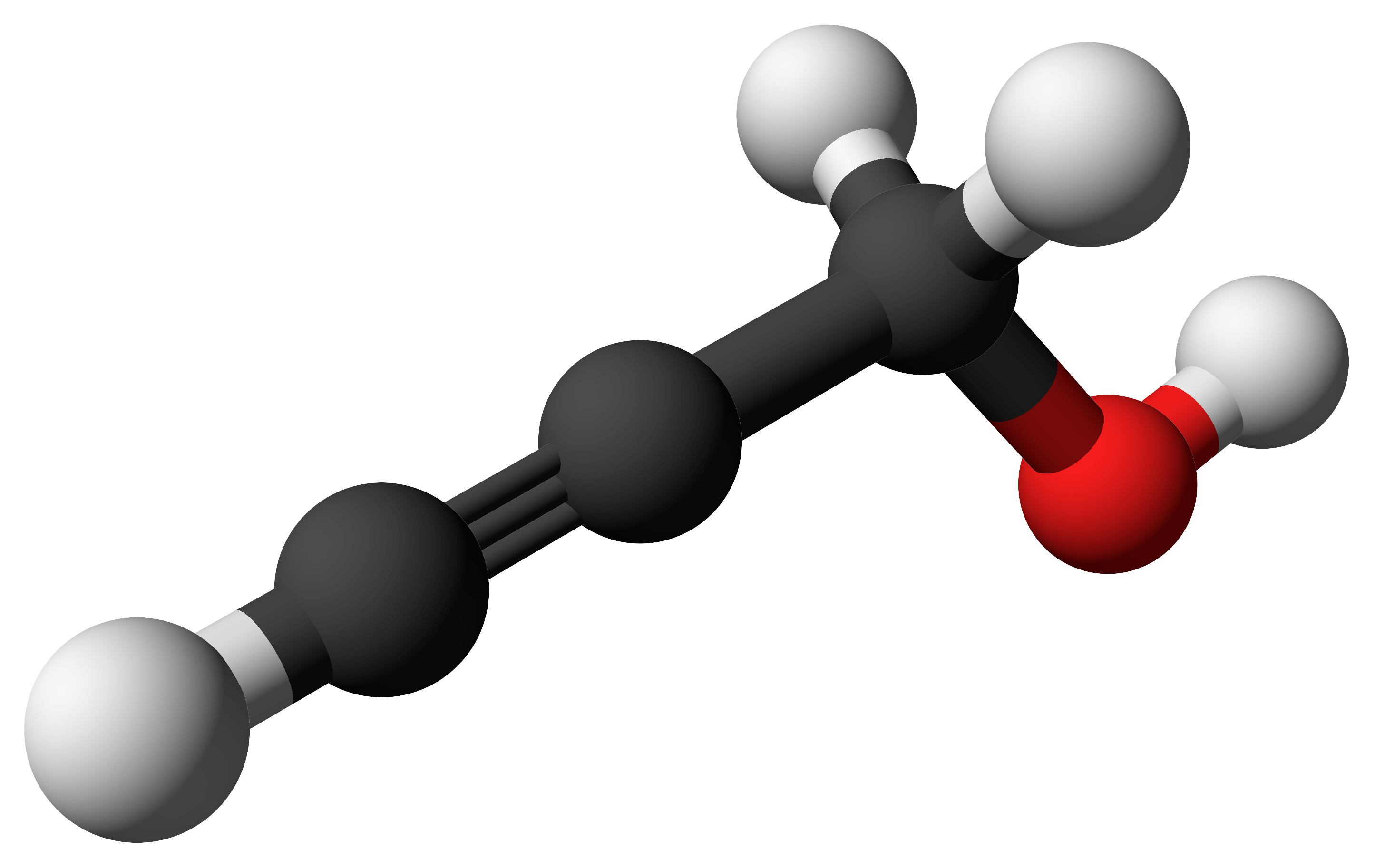
- 3D ball-and-stick structure of propargyl alcohol

Names
- Preferred IUPAC name Prop-2-yn-1-ol
- Other names propynol, 2-propynol, 2-propyn-1-ol, hydroxymethylacetylene.

Identifiers
CAS Number	107-19-7
3D model (JSmol)	Interactive image
ChEBI	CHEBI:28905
ChEMBL	ChEMBL1563026
ChemSpider	21106466
ECHA InfoCard	100.003.157
EC Number	203-471-2
KEGG	C05986
PubChem CID	7859
RTECS number	UK5075000
UNII	E920VF499L
UN number	1986 2929
CompTox Dashboard (EPA)	DTXSID5021883
- InChI: InChI=1S/C3H4O/c1-2-3-4/h1,4H,3H2 Key: TVDSBUOJIPERQY-UHFFFAOYSA-N; InChI=1/C3H4O/c1-2-3-4/h1,4H,3H2 Key: TVDSBUOJIPERQY-UHFFFAOYAE
- SMILES: C#CCO

Properties
Chemical formula	C_{3}H_{4}O
Molar mass	56.064 g·mol^{−1}
Appearance	Colorless to straw-colored liquid
Odor	geranium-like
Density	0.9715 g/cm^{3}
Melting point	−51 to −48 °C (−60 to −54 °F; 222 to 225 K)
Boiling point	114 to 115 °C (237 to 239 °F; 387 to 388 K)
Solubility in water	miscible
Vapor pressure	12 mmHg (20 °C)

Hazards
- GHS labelling
Pictograms	(GHS02: Flammable) (GHS06: Toxic) (GHS05: Corrosive) (GHS08: Health hazard) (GHS09: Environmental hazard)
Signal word	Danger
Hazard statements	H226, H301, H310, H314, H330, H373, H411
Precautionary statements	P210, P233, P240, P241, P242, P243, P260, P264, P270, P271, P273, P280, P301+P310, P301+P330+P331, P302+P352, P303+P361+P353, P304+P340, P305+P351+P338, P310, P311, P312, P321, P322, P330, P361, P363, P370+P378, P391, P403+P233, P403+P235, P405, P501
NFPA 704 (fire diamond)	3 3 3
Flash point	36 °C; 97 °F; 309 K (open cup)
- NIOSH (US health exposure limits)
PEL (Permissible)	none
REL (Recommended)	TWA 1 ppm (2 mg/m^{3}) [skin]
IDLH (Immediate danger)	N.D.
Safety data sheet (SDS)	External SDS
- Except where otherwise noted, data are given for materials in their standard state (at 25 °C [77 °F], 100 kPa). verify (what is ?) Infobox references

Propargyl alcohol, or 2-propyn-1-ol, is an organic compound with the formula C_{3}H_{4}O. It is the simplest stable alcohol containing an alkyne functional group. Propargyl alcohol is a colorless viscous liquid that is miscible with water and most polar organic solvents.

== Reactions and applications ==
Propargyl alcohol polymerizes with heating or treatment with base. It is used as a corrosion inhibitor, a metal complex solution, a solvent stabilizer and an electroplating brightener additive. It is also used as an intermediate in organic synthesis. Secondary and tertiary substituted propargylic alcohols undergo catalyzed rearrangement reactions to form α,β-unsaturated carbonyl compounds via the Meyer–Schuster rearrangement and others. It can be oxidized to propynal or propargylic acid.

As an indication of the electronegativity of an sp carbon, propargyl alcohol is significantly more acidic (pK_{a} = 13.6) compared to its sp^{2}-containing analog allyl alcohol (pK_{a} = 15.5), which is in turn more acidic than the fully saturated (sp^{3} carbons only) n-propyl alcohol (pK_{a} = 16.1).

== Preparation ==
Propargyl alcohol is produced by the copper-catalysed addition of formaldehyde to acetylene as a by-product of the industrial synthesis of but-2-yne-1,4-diol. It can also be prepared by dehydrochlorination of 3-chloro-2-propen-1-ol by NaOH.

== Safety ==
Propargyl alcohol is a flammable liquid, toxic by inhalation, highly toxic by ingestion, toxic by skin absorption, and corrosive.

== See also ==
- Alkynylation
- Allyl alcohol
- Propargyl
- Propargyl chloride
