= Favorskii rearrangement =

Named after	Alexei Yevgrafovich Favorskii
Reaction type	Rearrangement reaction

Identifiers
Organic Chemistry Portal	favorsky-reaction
RSC ontology ID	RXNO:0000385

In organic chemistry, the Favorskii rearrangement is the rearrangement reaction of an α-halo ketone into a carboxylic acid derivative in the presence of a base such hydroxide or an alkoxide. In the case of cyclic α-halo ketones the reaction constitutes a ring contraction. The reaction is named for the Russian chemist Alexei Yevgrafovich Favorskii who discovered it in 1894. It should not be confused with the Favorskii reaction, which is the nucleophilic addition of a terminal alkyne to a ketone generating a propargyl alcohol.

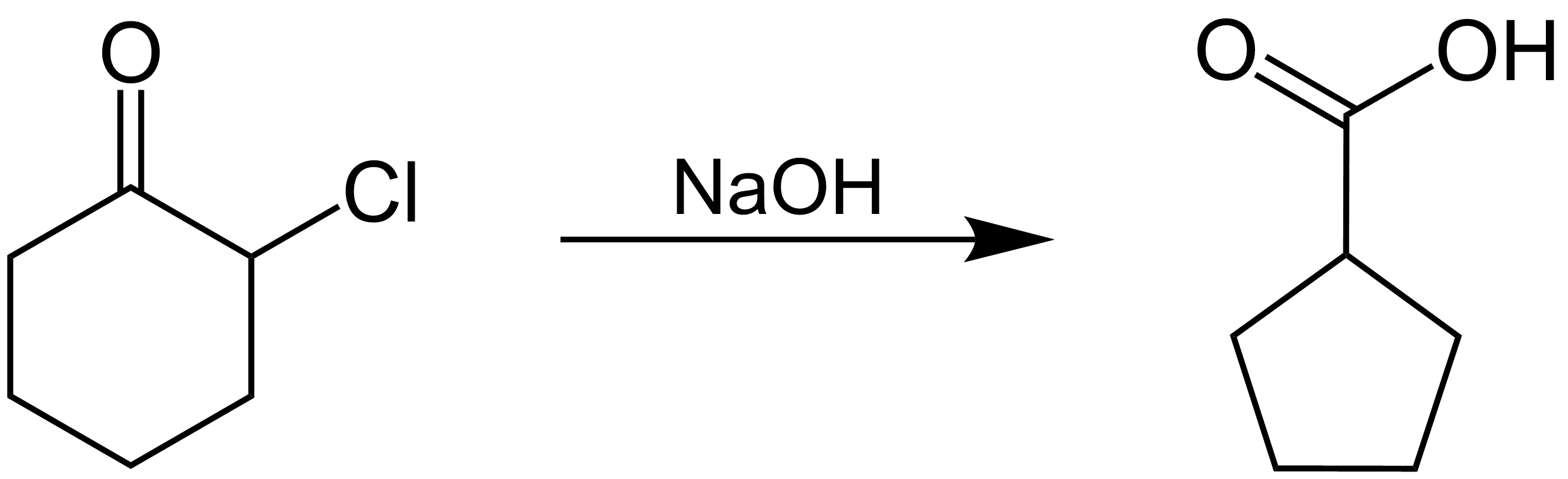
The Favorskii rearrangement

== Reaction mechanism ==
The Favorskii rearrangement begins with base-promoted enolate formation followed by S_{N}2 displacement of the halogen leading to formation of a cyclopropenone intermediate. Another molecule of base then adds to the ketone. Collapse of the tetrahedral intermediate leads to cyclopropenone ring opening. The ring opening is governed by the stability of the resulting anion with benzylic > primary > secondary > tertiary carbon. Protonation then provides the carboxylic acid or ester, depending on choice of base.

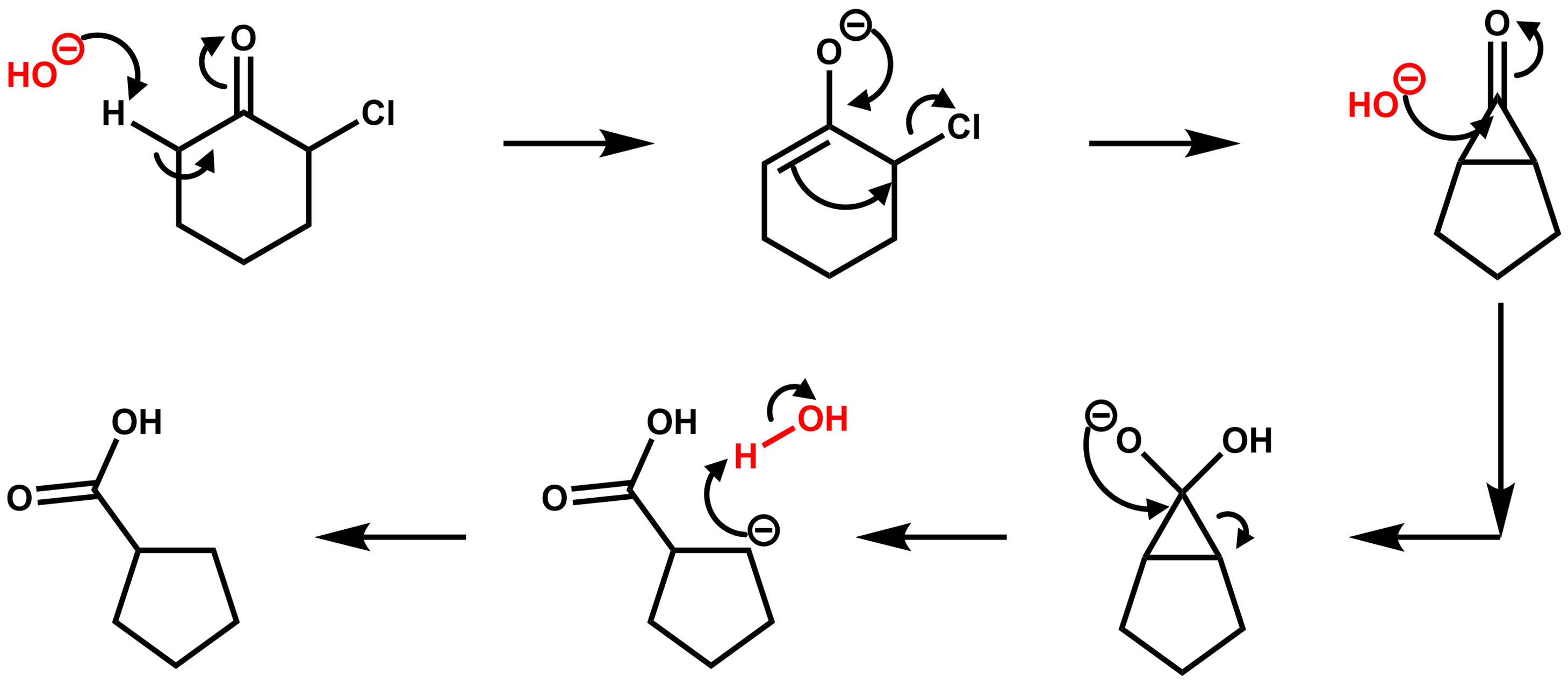
Favorskii rearrangement mechanism (animated version)

The reaction has been shown to stereospecific in the S_{N}2 displacement of the halogen to form the cyclopropenone. The intermediacy of the cyclopropenone was demonstrated via ^{14}C-labelling study where a 1:1 mixture of the two products was obtained as would be expected from unselective opening of the cyclopropenone. A similar result was obtained from the rearrangement of two isomeric α-chloroketones, both of which provide the same product based on the higher stability of the benzylic anion.

Stereospecific Favorskii Rearrangement

^{14}C Labelling in the Favorskii Rearrangement

Convergent Favorskii Rearrangement

When enolate formation is impossible, harsh reaction conditions can still sometimes induce a similar reaction, called the pseudo- or quasi-Favorskii rearrangement. The alternate reaction pathway probably resembles the benzilic acid rearrangement: base initially adds to the ketone, and the resulting acetal anion collapses in concert with carbon migration and halide expulsion.

== Synthetic Applications ==
The most common use of the Favorskii rearrangement is in the context of ring contractions. The reaction became popular for the synthesis of strained cyclic compounds in the 1970s. For example, the synthesis of cubane involves two distinct Favorskii rearrangements:

Cubane Synthesis

Ketones with multiple halogen atoms still undergo rearrangement, but often provide the α,β-unsaturated carbonyl compounds. An early example of this comes from the "Wallach degradation" of brominated pulegone. Upon ring opening of the cyclopropanone intermediate, elimination of the tertiary bromide yields the α,β-unsaturated ketone. This key intermediate has been used in the total synthesis of several complex natural products such as Iridomyrmecin.

Favorskii Rearrangement in Total Synthesis

α,α,α'‑Trihaloketones generally do not undergo a second elimination to the ynone, but instead for halogenated α,β-unsaturated carbonyl compounds. α,α,α'‑Trihalomethyl ketone substrates undergo the haloform reaction instead.

Tribromoketone Favorskii Rearrangement

== Photo-Favorskii reaction ==
Favorskii rearrangements also occur through photochemical excitation. The photo-Favorskii reaction has been used to unlock certain phosphates (for instance those of ATP) protected as para‑hydroxyphenylacetate esters. The deprotection is believed to proceed through a triplet diradical (3) and a dione spiro intermediate (4), although the latter has thus far eluded detection:

== See also ==
- Benzilic acid rearrangement — similar carboxylate extrusion
- Trimethylenemethane cycloaddition, which can proceed via a similar mechanism
- Homo-Favorskii rearrangement, the rearrangement of β-halo ketones and cyclobutanones
- Wolff rearrangement - can react similarly
- Dowd-Beckwith ring-expansion reaction — radical analogue (when applied to single-carbon expansions)
