= Cyclobutanone =

Names
- Preferred IUPAC name Cyclobutanone

Identifiers
CAS Number	1191-95-3
3D model (JSmol)	Interactive image
ChemSpider	13840
ECHA InfoCard	100.013.405
PubChem CID	14496
UNII	6PF2SH405U
CompTox Dashboard (EPA)	DTXSID9061592
- InChI: InChI=1S/C4H6O/c5-4-2-1-3-4/h1-3H2 Key: SHQSVMDWKBRBGB-UHFFFAOYSA-N
- SMILES: O=C1CCC1

Properties
Chemical formula	C_{4}H_{6}O
Molar mass	70.091 g·mol^{−1}
Appearance	Colorless liquid
Density	0.9547 g/cm^{3} (0 °C)
Melting point	−50.9 °C (−59.6 °F; 222.2 K)
Boiling point	99.75 °C (211.55 °F; 372.90 K)
- Except where otherwise noted, data are given for materials in their standard state (at 25 °C [77 °F], 100 kPa). Infobox references

Cyclobutanone is an organic compound with molecular formula (CH_{2})_{3}CO. It is a four-membered cyclic ketone (cycloalkanone). It is a colorless volatile liquid at room temperature. Since cyclopropanone is highly sensitive, cyclobutanone is the smallest easily handled cyclic ketone.

== Preparation ==
Kischner synthesized cyclobutanone from cyclobutanecarboxylic acid

The Russian chemist Nikolai Kischner first prepared cyclobutanone in a low yield from cyclobutanecarboxylic acid. Kischner's process, involving several steps, is cumbersome and inefficient; more efficient, high-yielding syntheses have since been developed.

One strategy involves degradation of five-carbon building blocks. For example, the oxidative decarboxylation of cyclobutanecarboxylic acid was improved by the use of other reagents and methods.

A newer, more efficient preparation of cyclobutanone was found by P. Lipp and R. Köster in which a solution of diazomethane in diethyl ether is reacted with ketene. This reaction is based on a ring expansion of the cyclopropanone intermediate initially formed, wherein molecular nitrogen is split off:

The reaction mechanism was confirmed by a reaction using ^{14}C-labeled diazomethane.

Another synthesis of cyclobutanone involves lithium iodide catalyzed rearrangement of oxaspiropentane, which is formed by epoxidation of the easily accessible methylenecyclopropane:

Cyclobutanone can also be prepared in a two step procedure by dialkylation of 1,3-dithiane with 1-bromo-3-chloropropane followed by deprotection to the ketone with mercuric chloride (HgCl_{2}) and cadmium carbonate (CdCO_{3}).

Cyclobutanones are the intermediates of the homo-Favorskii rearrangement, and can be isolated when nucleophiles are absent, as in the synthesis of kelsoene:

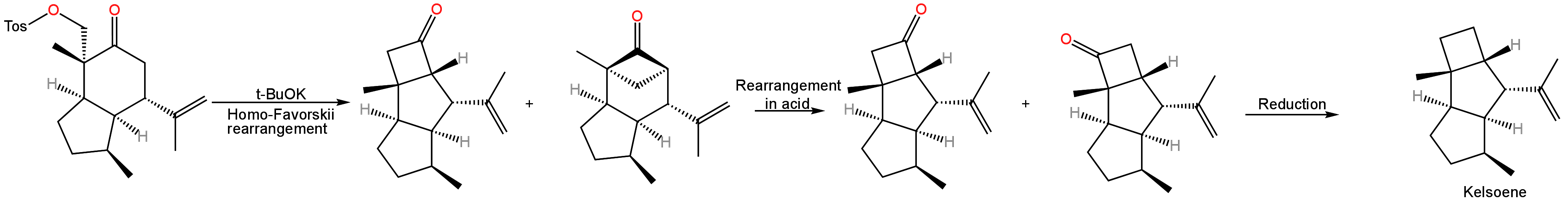
Kelsoene synthesis

== Reactions ==
At about 350 °C, cyclobutanone decomposes into ethylene and ketene. The activation energy for this [2+2] cycloelimination is 52 kcal/mol. The reverse reaction, the [2+2] cycloaddition of ketene and ethylene, has never been observed.

Decomposition of cyclobutanone

== See also ==
Other cyclic ketones:

- Cyclopropanone
- Cyclopentanone
- Cyclohexanone
