= Trimethylenemethane complexes =

Class of chemical compounds

Trimethylenemethane complexes are metal complexes of the organic compound trimethylenemethane. Several examples are known, and some have been employed in organic synthesis.

== History ==
The synthesis of cyclobutadieneiron tricarbonyl pointed to the possible existence of related complexes of elusive organic compounds. Trimethylenemethane (TMM) has a natural connection to cyclobutadiene, and, in 1966, Emerson and co-workers reported the first trimethylenemethane (TMM) transition metal complex, η^{4}-[C(CH_{2})_{3}]Fe(CO)_{3}. This compound became the starting point for extensive studies.

== Synthesis ==
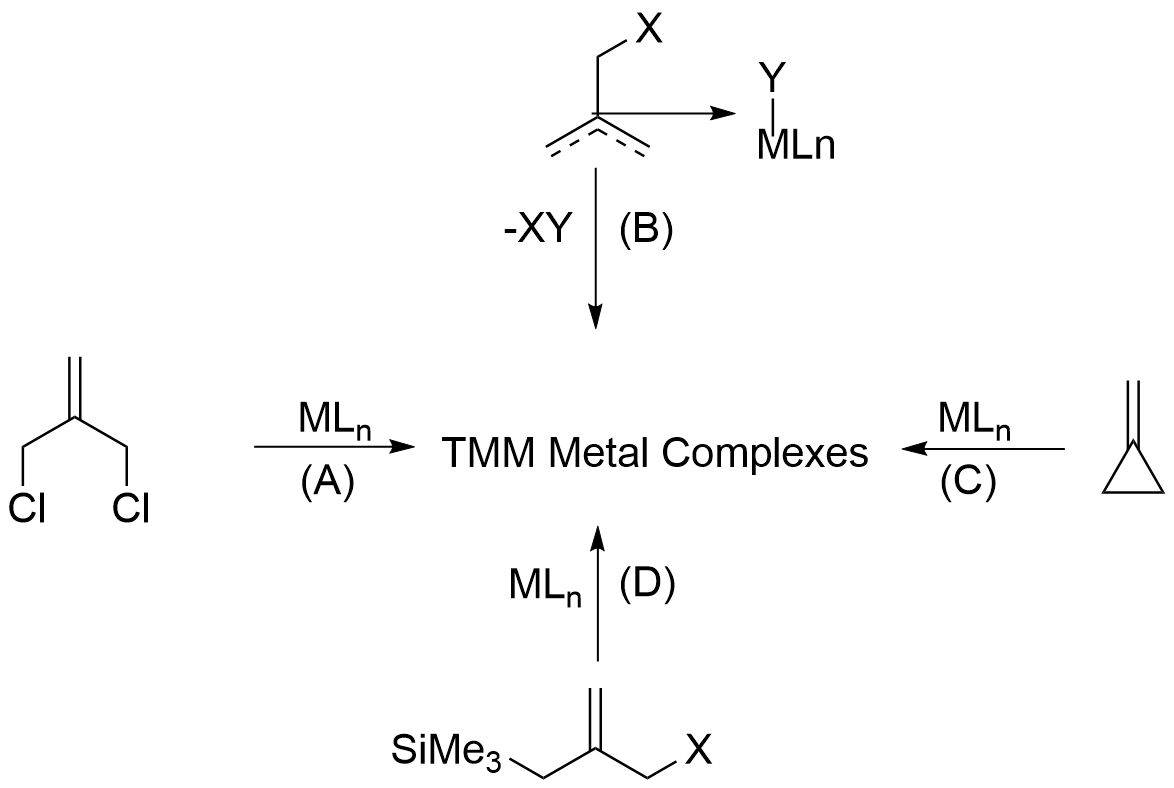
Figure 1

Generally speaking, trimethylenemethane complexes are synthesized in the following four ways: (A) the dehalogenation of α, α'-dihalosubstituted precursors, (B) the thermal extrusion of XY (XY = HCl, Br_{2}, and CH_{4},) from η^{3}-methylallyl complexes, (C) the ring opening of alkylidenecyclopropanes, and (D) the elimination of Me_{3}SiX [X = OAc, Cl, OS(O)_{2}Me] from functionalized allylsilanes (Figure 1).

=== Dehalogenation of α, α'-dihalosubstituted precursors ===
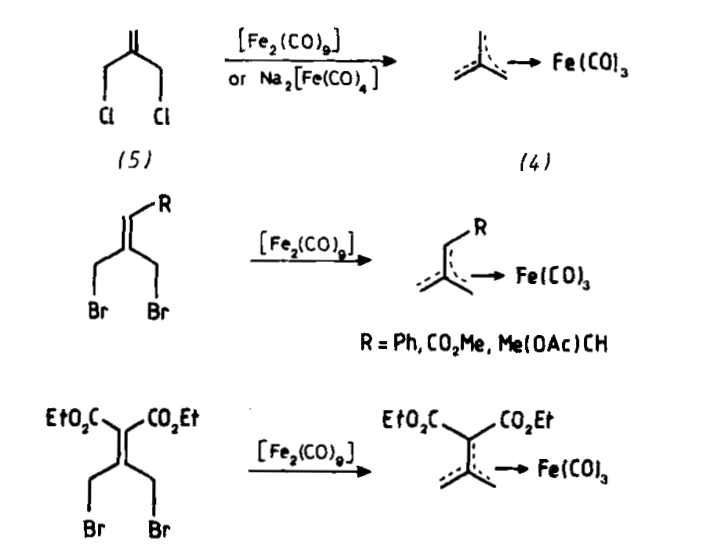
Figure 2

η^{4}-[C(CH_{2})_{3}]Fe(CO)_{3}, the first trimethylenemethane metal complex to be reported, was obtained from the reaction of 3-chloro-2-chloromethylprop-1-ene with Fe_{2}(CO)_{9} or Na_{2}[Fe(CO)_{4}]. Followed by this result, a number of substituted trimethylenemethane iron complexes have been prepared.

The thermal extrusion from η^{3}-methylallyl complexes was reported by Emerson.The iron allyl complex, obtained from the reaction of 3-chloro-2-methylprop-1-ene with [Fe_{2}(CO)_{9}], decomposed on heating to afford the iron trimethylenemethane complex.

=== Ring opening of alkylidenecyclopropanes ===
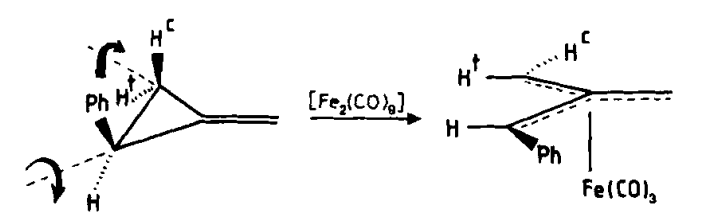
Stereochemistry of the ring opening of methylenecyclopropanes by Fe(0).

In the presence of [Fe_{2}(CO)_{9}], the ring opening of 2-substituted methylenecyclopropanes leads to the formation of various η^{4}-trimethylenemethane complexes containing different functional groups, such as (R1 = H, R2 = Ph), (R1 = Me, R2 = Ph), (R1 = R2 = Ph), and (R1 = H, R2 = CH=CH2). The stereochemistry has been elucidated by deuterium-labeling experiments.

=== Elimination of Me_{3}SiX [X = OAc, Cl, OS(O)_{2}Me] from functionalized allylsilanes ===
tetrakis(triphenylphosphine)palladium(0) is a precursor to highly reactive η^{3}-trimethylenemethane complexes. Allylsilanes oxidatively add to some low-valent d^{8} complexes resulting in the formation of an η^{1}-allyl complexes, followed by the formation of an η^{3}-allyl complex, and finally elimination of Me_{3}SiX to yield the η^{4}-trimethylenemethane complex. The isolation of the proposed intermidate further confirmed the mechanism.

IrCl(CO)(PPh_{3})_{2} + CH_{2}=C(CH_{2}Cl)(CH_{2}tms) → η^{4}-[C(CH_{2})_{3}]IrCl(PPh_{3})(CO) + tmsCl + PPh_{3} (Ph = C6H5)

== Structure ==
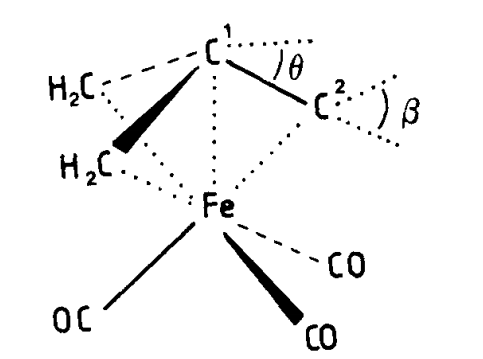
Structure of η^{4}-C(CH_{2})_{3}]Fe(CO)_{3}.

According to gas phase electron diffraction, η^{4}-C(CH_{2})_{3}]Fe(CO)_{3} adopts a staggered conformation about the iron center. The ligands, which include carbonyl and a trigonal-pyramidal trimethylenemethane, are arranged in the usual umbrella-type configuration. The central carbon of the trimethylenemethane ligand is closer to the iron center compared to the outer methylene carbons. This was confirmed by the Fe-C(central) distance measuring 1.94(1) Å, while the Fe-CH distances were measured at 2.12 Å. Moreover, this result has also been confirmed by X-ray diffraction and vibrational spectrum.

The primary bonding interaction occurs between the 2e set of the Fe(CO)_{3} fragment and e" on the trimethylenemethane ligand. However, if the metal-trimethylenemethane axis is rotated by 60° into an eclipsed geometry, the interaction between 2e and e" is minimized, which results in an increase in the energy of the HOMO in the complex, which is a significant factor that provides a barrier to rotation, as shown in Figure 6b.

Extended Huckel calculations give a barrier of 87 KJ mol^{−1} using a planar trimethylenemethane ligand. Introducing a puckered conformation to the trimethylenemethane ligand, which resembles the experimental geometry, leads to an increase in the calculated barrier to 98.6 kJ mol^{−1}. This puckering induces mixing of s character into e" orbitals, causing a more pronounced orientation toward the metal center. Consequently, the overlap between e" and 2e orbitals is enhanced. The degree of puckering, characterized by θ, falls within the range of 12°. The mixing of s character into e" also results in the H-C-H plane being tipped away from the metal. The angle β, between C-1 and C-2 and the plane H-C-H, is typically about 15°.

== Reactions ==
Trimethylenemethane complexes undergo a wide variety of reactions including those with electrophiles, nucleophiles as well as redox reactions.

η^{4}-C(CH_{2})_{3}]Fe(CO)_{3} adds hydrogen chloride to yield η^{3}-CH_{3}C(CH_{2})]Fe(CO)_{3}. Substituted trimethylenemethane iron complexes, on the other hand, react with strong acids to produce cross-conjugated dienyl iron cations and η^{4}-diene complexes. η^{4}-C(CH_{2})_{3}]Mo(CO)_{2}(C_{5}H_{5})^{+} add nucleophiles to give charge-neutral η^{3}-allyl complexes.

η^{4}-[C(CH_{2})_{3}]Fe(PR_{3})_{3} (PR_{3} = PMe_{3} or PMe_{2}Ph) is oxidized by silver trifluoromethanesulfonate to give the 17-electron cation.
