= Benzilic acid rearrangement =

1,2-rearrangement of 1,2-diketones

The benzilic acid rearrangement is formally the 1,2-rearrangement of 1,2-diketones to form α-hydroxy–carboxylic acids using a base. This reaction receives its name from the reaction of benzil with potassium hydroxide to form benzilic acid. First performed by Justus von Liebig in 1838, it is the first reported example of a rearrangement reaction. It has become a classic reaction in organic synthesis and has been reviewed many times before. It can be viewed as an intramolecular redox reaction, as one carbon center is oxidized while the other is reduced.

Scheme 1. Benzilic acid rearrangement

The reaction has been shown to work in aromatic, semi-aromatic, aliphatic, and heterocyclic substrates. The reaction works best when the ketone functional groups have no adjacent enolizable protons, as this allows aldol condensation to compete. The reaction is formally a ring contraction when used on cyclic diketones. It has been found that aryl groups more readily migrate than alkyl groups, and that aryl groups with electron-withdrawing groups migrate the fastest.

== Reaction mechanism ==
The reaction is a representative of 1,2-rearrangements. The long-established reaction mechanism was first proposed in its entirety by Christopher Kelk Ingold, and has been updated with in silico data as outlined below. The reaction is second order overall in terms of rate, being first order in diketone and first order in base.

A hydroxide anion attacks one of the ketone groups in 1 in a nucleophilic addition to form the alkoxide 2. The next step requires a bond rotation to conformer 3 which places the migrating group R in position for attack on the second carbonyl group. In a concerted step, the migrating R group attacks the α-carbonyl group forming another alkoxide with concomitant formation of a keto-group at the other carbon. This migration step is rate-determining. This sequence resembles a nucleophilic acyl substitution. Calculations show that when R is methyl the charge build-up on this group in the transition state can be as high as 0.22, and that the methyl group is positioned between the central carbon–carbon bond.

Mechanismus der Benzilsäure-Umlagerung als Animation

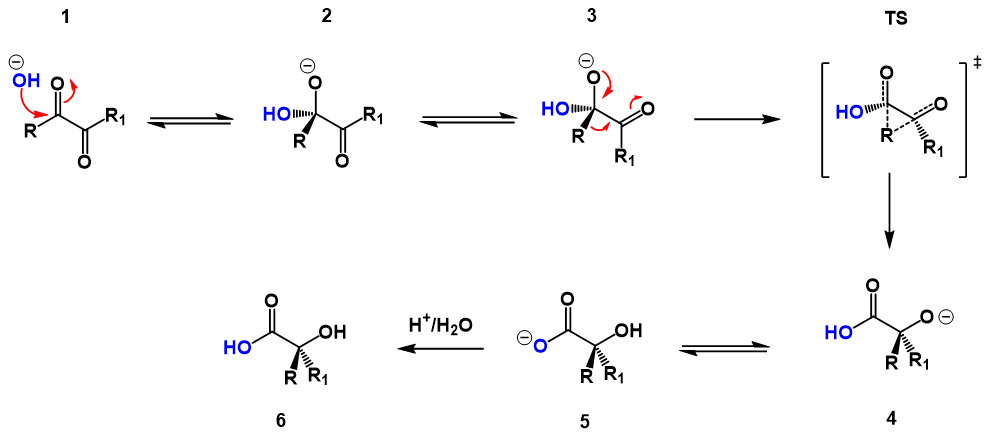

The carboxylic acid in intermediate 4 is less basic than the alkoxide and therefore reversible proton transfer takes place favoring intermediate 5 which is protonated on acidic workup to the final α-hydroxy–carboxylic acid 6. Calculations show that an accurate description of the reaction sequence is possible with the participation of 4 water molecules taking responsibility for the stabilization of charge buildup. They also provide a shuttle for the efficient transfer of one proton in the formation of intermediate 5.

The above mechanism is consistent with all available experimental evidence. The equilibrium between species 1 and 2 is supported by ^{18}O Isotopic labeling experiments. In deuterated water, carbonyl oxygen exchange occurs much faster than the rearrangement, indicating that the first equilibrium is not the rate-determining step. Further experiments showed a larger relative rate in a deuterated solvent system compared to a non-deuterated solvent system of otherwise identical composition. This was explained as being due to the greater relative basicity of the deuterated hydroxide anion compared to the normal hydroxide anion, and was used to indicate that hydrogen migration did not occur in the rate determining step of the reaction. This ruled out a concerted mechanism for the reaction, as hydrogen transfer would occur in the rate determining step.

== Variations ==
=== Benzilic ester rearrangement ===
This reaction is identical to the normal benzilic acid rearrangement, except that an alkoxide or an amide anion is used in place of a hydroxide ion. The alkoxide used should not be easily oxidizable (such as potassium ethoxide) as this favors the Meerwein–Ponndorf–Verley reduction pathway as a side reaction. The reaction is second order overall in terms of rate, being first order in terms of alkoxide and first order in terms of diketone. The product of the reaction is an α-hydroxy–ester or an α-hydroxy-amide.

=== Alpha-ketol rearrangement ===
The alpha-ketol rearrangement is an interconversion of a hydroxyl alpha to a carbonyl to the complementary carbonyl and hydroxyl groups, with migration of a substituent. It is mechanistically equivalent to the benzyllic acid rearrangement at the point after the nucleophile attacks the 1,2-dicarbonyl. This variation of the reaction has been known to occur in many substrates bearing the acyloin functional group. The picture below shows the ring expansion of a cyclopentane to a cyclohexane ring as an example reaction.

== See also ==
- Cannizzaro reaction
- Favorskii rearrangement
- Pinacol rearrangement
