= C5H11N =

The molecular formula C_{5}H_{11}N (molar mass: 85.15 g/mol, exact mass: 85.0891 u) may refer to:

- Piperidine (hexahydropyridine)
- Cyclopentylamine (cyclopentanamine)
- 1-Methylpyrrolidine
- 2-Methylpyrrolidine
