= C4H6Cl2 =

The molecular formula C_{4}H_{6}Cl_{2} (molar mass: 124.996 g/mol, exact mass: 123.9847 u) may refer to:

- 1,1-Bis(chloromethyl)ethylene
- 1,4-Dichlorobut-2-ene
