= C4H9N =

The molecular formula C_{4}H_{9}N (molar mass: 71.12 g/mol) may refer to:

- Pyrrolidine (azolidine)
- Cyclobutylamine (cyclobutanamine)
- 2,2-Dimethylaziridine
- 1,2-Dimethylaziridine
