= Α-Halo ketone =

Functional group in organic chemistry

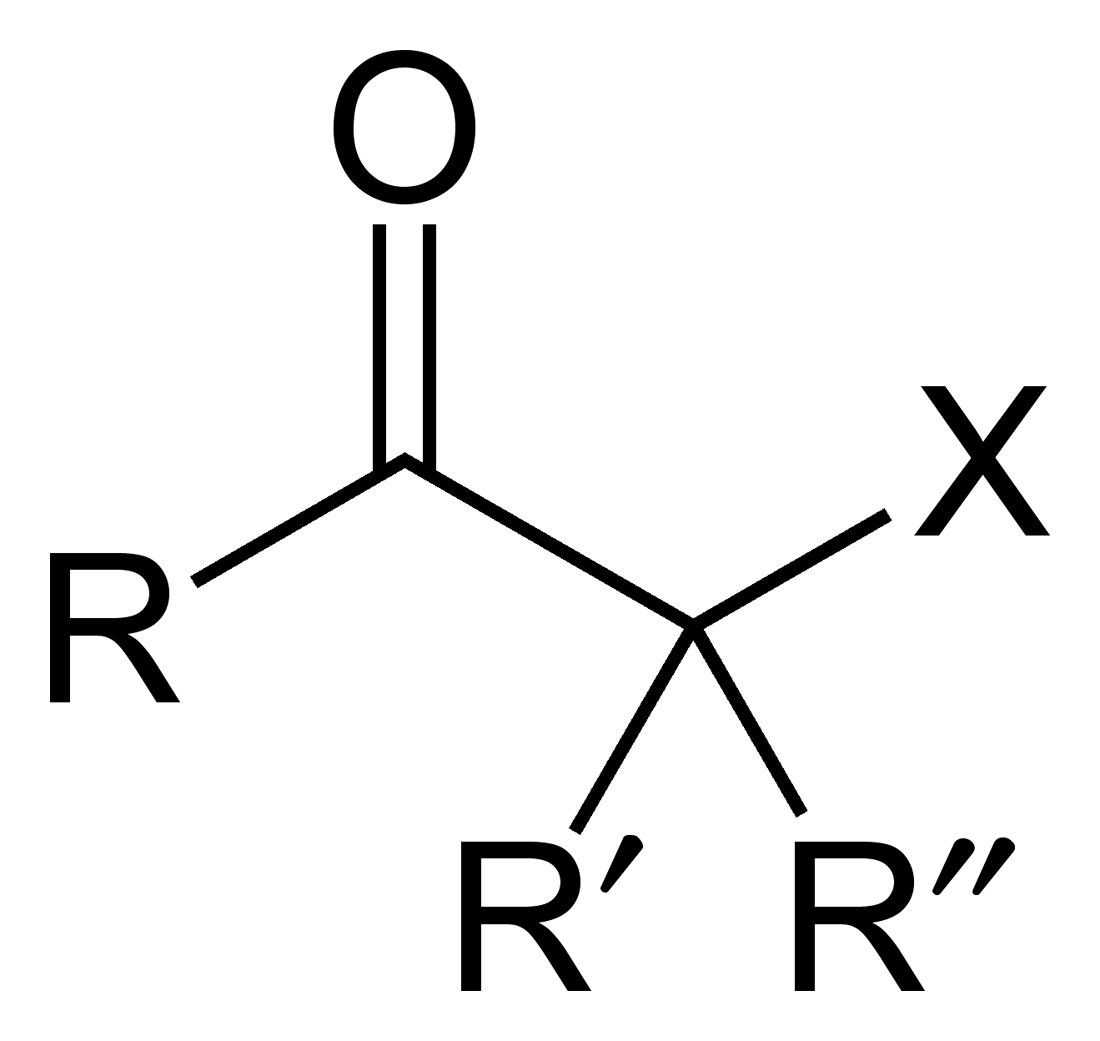
Skeletal formula of a general α-haloketone

In organic chemistry, an α-halo ketone is a functional group consisting of a ketone group or more generally a carbonyl group with an α-halogen substituent. α-Halo ketones are alkylating agents. Prominent α-halo ketones include phenacyl bromide and chloroacetone.

== Structure ==
The general structure is RR′C(X)C(=O)R where R is an alkyl or aryl residue and X any one of the halogens. The preferred conformation of a halo ketone is that of a cisoid with the halogen and carbonyl sharing the same plane as the steric hindrance with the carbonyl alkyl group is generally larger.

== Halo ketone synthesis ==
Halo ketones and halo carbonyl compounds in general are synthesized by reaction of carbonyl compounds with sources of X^{+} (X = halogen), which is provided using halogens:

RC(O)CH_{3} + X_{2} → RC(O)CH_{2}X + HX

Specialized sources of electrophilic halogenating agents include N-bromosuccinimide and 1,3-dibromo-5,5-dimethylhydantoin (DBDMH). The halogen replaces an α hydrogen in the structure.

An alternative approach is by insertion of a methylene group into an acyl halide. The Nierenstein reaction uses diazomethane to convert acyl chlorides into α-chloromethyl ketones.

=== Asymmetric synthesis ===
Efforts are reported in asymmetric synthesis of halo carbonyls through organocatalysis. In one study an acid chloride is converted into an α-halo ester with a strong base (sodium hydride), a bromine donor and an organocatalyst based on proline and quinine:

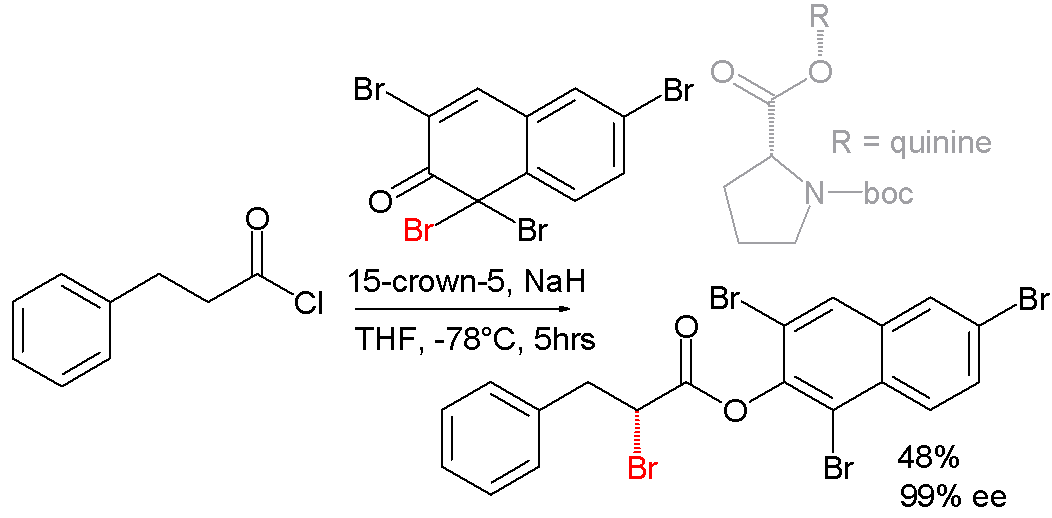
Acid chloride bromination Dogo-Isonagie et al. 2006

In the proposed reaction mechanism the base first converts the acid chloride to the ketene, the organocatalyst then introduces chirality through its quinonoid tertiary amine, forming a ketene adduct.

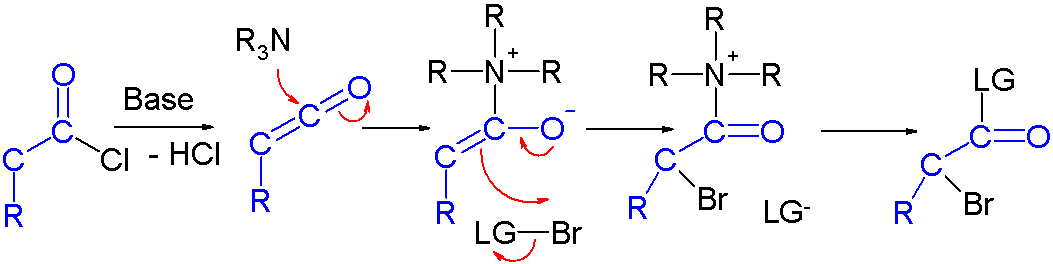
Acid chloride bromination reaction mechanism Dogo-Isonagie 2006

== Reactions ==
The carbonyl increases the electrophilicity of the α position, making them more susceptible to substitution reactions. For example, chloroacetone reacts 36,000 times faster than 1-chloropropane in an S_{N}2 reaction using potassium iodide in acetone.

The halo group can be removed in reductive dehalogenation of halo ketones. α-Halo ketones can also be converted to alkenes by treatment with hydrazine.

Due to the presence of two electron withdrawing groups (carbonyl and halide), the α-hydrogen is acidic. This property is exploited in the Favorskii rearrangement, where base abstracts first an acidic α-hydrogen and the resulting carbanion then displaces the halogen. Halo ketones also form enols with phosphites in the Perkow reaction.

In crossed aldol reactions between halo ketones and aldehydes, the initial reaction product is a halohydrin which can subsequently form an oxirane in the presence of base (the Darzens reaction).

Like unsubstituted ketones, α-halo ketones are interchangeable with the corresponding α-halo imines. However, haloimines can cyclize to aziridines (the De Kimpe aziridine synthesis) or azirines (the Neber rearrangement). This allows some chemical transformations to be achieved that are not possible with the parent halo ketones directly.

=== Precursors to heterocycles ===
Halo ketones take part in several reaction types, especially since they are bifunctional, with two electrophilic sites (α-carbon and carbonyl carbon). In one manifestation of this duality, they are precursors to heterocycles. Thiazoles arise from reaction of chloroacetone with thioamides.2-Aminothiazoles are similarly produced by reaction of 2-chloroketones with thioureas. Pyrroles may be synthesized by reaction of halo ketones with dicarbonyls and ammonia in the Hantzsch pyrrole synthesis.
