= Cyclopropanone =

Chemical compound

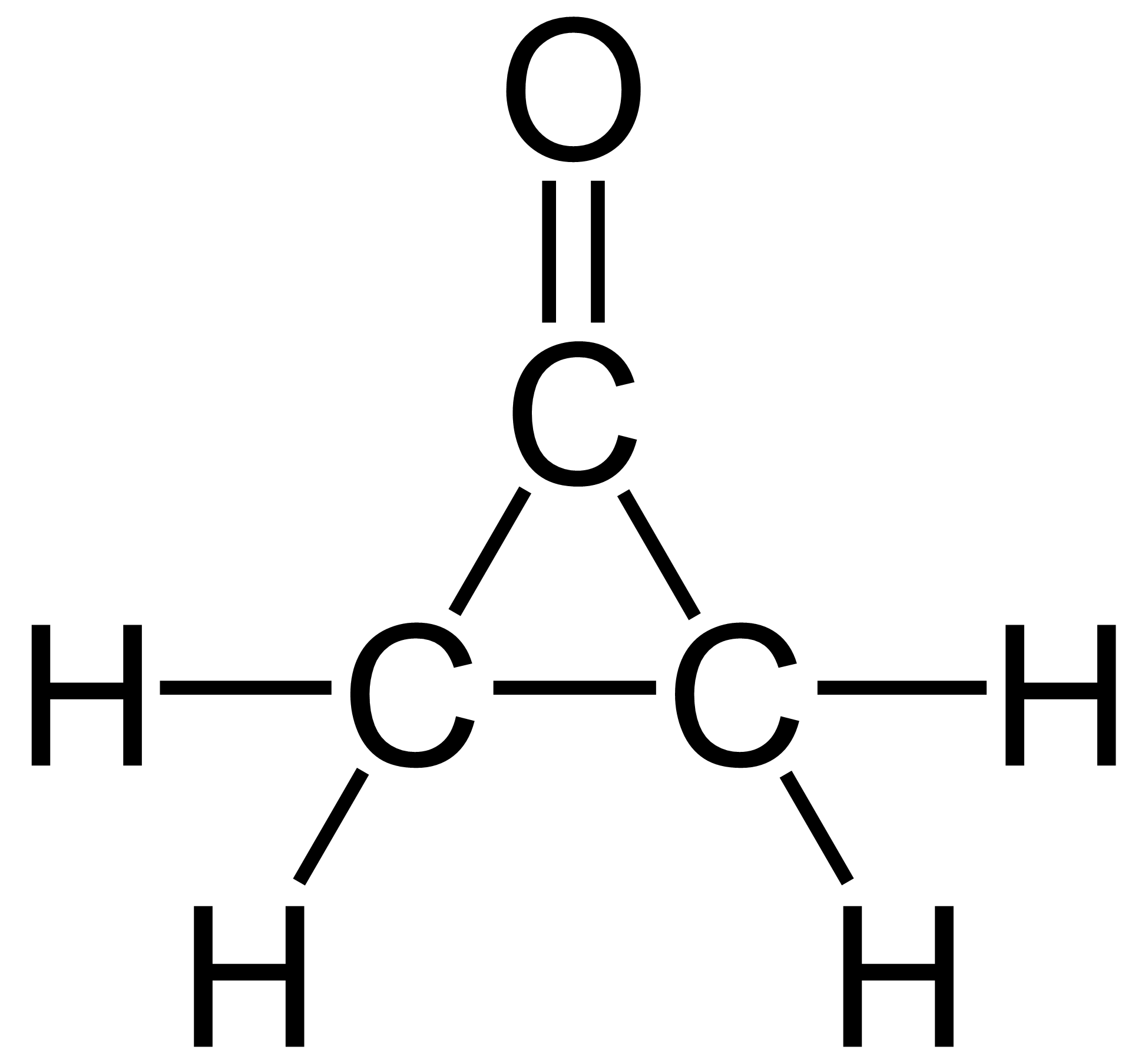

Names
- Preferred IUPAC name Cyclopropanone

Identifiers
CAS Number	5009-27-8
3D model (JSmol)	Interactive image; Interactive image
ChemSpider	122027
PubChem CID	138404
CompTox Dashboard (EPA)	DTXSID30198202
- InChI: InChI=1S/C3H4O/c4-3-1-2-3/h1-2H2 Key: VBBRYJMZLIYUJQ-UHFFFAOYSA-N; InChI=1/C3H4O/c4-3-1-2-3/h1-2H2 Key: VBBRYJMZLIYUJQ-UHFFFAOYAV
- SMILES: C1CC1=O; O=C1CC1

Properties
Chemical formula	C_{3}H_{4}O
Molar mass	56.064 g·mol^{−1}
Appearance	Colorless
Density	0.867 g/mL at 25 °C
Melting point	−90 °C (−130 °F; 183 K)
Boiling point	50 to 53 °C (122 to 127 °F; 323 to 326 K) at 22 mmHg
- Except where otherwise noted, data are given for materials in their standard state (at 25 °C [77 °F], 100 kPa). verify (what is ?) Infobox references

Cyclopropanone is an organic compound with molecular formula (CH_{2})_{2}CO consisting of a cyclopropane carbon framework with a ketone functional group. The parent compound is labile, being highly sensitive toward even weak nucleophiles. Surrogates of cyclopropanone include the ketals.

== Preparation ==
Cyclopropanone has been prepared by reaction of ketene with diazomethane in an unreactive solvent such as dichloromethane. These solutions are stable at −78 °C. In the presence of protic reagents such as carboxylic acids, primary and secondary amines, and alcohols, cyclopropanone converts to adducts, which are often isolatable at room temperature:

(CH_{2})_{2}CO + X-H → (CH_{2})_{2}C(X)(OH) (X-H = R_{2}N-H, HO-H, RO-H)

This reaction underlies cyclopropanone's polymerization at room temperature, initiated by traces of water. The isocyanate adducts can also be prepared directly through photochemical rearrangement of succinimino ethers.

== Structure ==
The C_{3}O atoms are coplanar. As deduced from the microwave spectrum, the H_{2}C-CH_{2} bond length of 157.5 pm is unusually long. By contrast, the C-C bond lengths in cyclopropane are 151 pm. The C=O bond length of 119 pm is short compared to the 123 pm bond length in acetone.

The value of ν_{C=O} in the infrared spectrum is near 1815 cm^{−1}, ca. 70 cm^{−1} higher than values for a typical ketone.

== Derivatives ==
Cyclopropanones are intermediates in the Favorskii rearrangement with cyclic ketones where carboxylic acid formation is accompanied by ring-contraction.

Cyclopropanones react as dienophiles in [4+3] cycloadditions, for instance with cyclic dienes such as furan. An oxyallyl intermediate or valence tautomer (formed by cleavage of the C2-C3 bond) is suggested as the active intermediate or even a biradical structure (compare to the related trimethylenemethane).

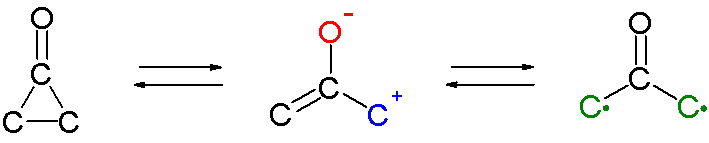

Other reactions of cyclopropanones take place through this intermediate. For instance enantiopure (+)-trans-2,3-di-tert-butylcyclopropanone racemizes when heated to 80 °C.

An oxyallyl intermediate is also proposed in the photochemical conversion of a 3,5-dihydro-4H-pyrazole-4-one with expulsion of nitrogen to an indane:

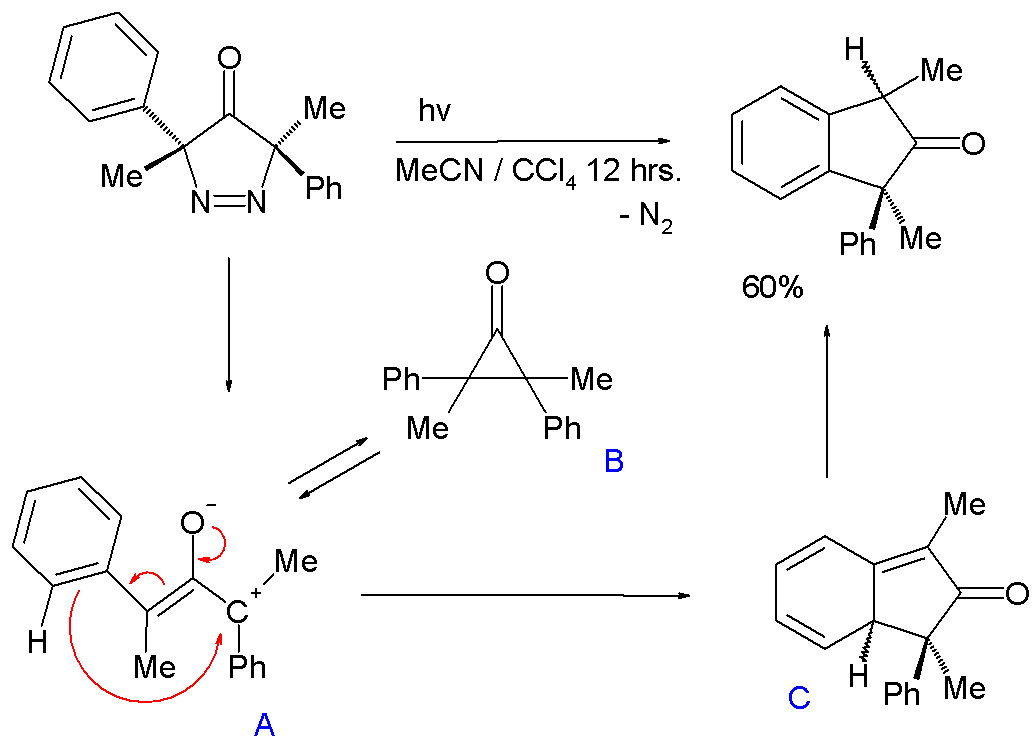

In this reaction oxyallyl intermediate A, in chemical equilibrium with cyclopropanone B attacks the phenyl ring through its carbocation forming a transient 1,3-cyclohexadiene C (with UV trace similar to isotoluene) followed by rearomatization. The energy difference between A and B is 5 to 7 kcal/mol (21 to 29 kJ/mol).

=== Coprine ===
The cyclopropanone derivative 1-aminocyclopropanol occurs naturally by hydrolyzes of coprine, a toxin in some mushrooms. 1-Aminocyclopropanol is an inhibitor of the enzyme acetaldehyde dehydrogenase.

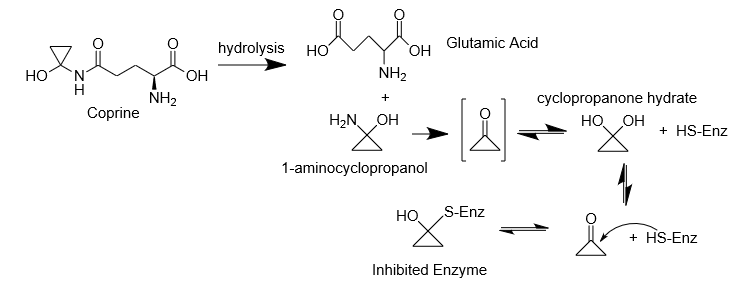

== See also ==
- Other cyclic ketones: cyclobutanone, cyclopentanone, cyclohexanone
- Other cyclopropane derivatives: cyclopropene, cyclopropenone
