= Cyclopropylamine =

Names
- Other names aminocyclopropane, CPA

Identifiers
CAS Number	765-30-0
3D model (JSmol)	Interactive image
Abbreviations	CPA
ChEBI	CHEBI:34660
ChemSpider	63025
ECHA InfoCard	100.011.038
EC Number	212-142-2
KEGG	C14150
PubChem CID	69828
UNII	8PR8XTH1X1
CompTox Dashboard (EPA)	DTXSID9061099
- InChI: InChI=1S/C3H7N/c4-3-1-2-3/h3H,1-2,4H2 Key: HTJDQJBWANPRPF-UHFFFAOYSA-N
- SMILES: C1CC1N

Properties
Chemical formula	C_{3}H_{7}N
Molar mass	57.096 g·mol^{−1}
Appearance	colorless liquid
Melting point	−35.4 °C (−31.7 °F; 237.8 K)
Boiling point	49–50 °C (120–122 °F; 322–323 K)

Hazards
- GHS labelling
Pictograms	(GHS02: Flammable) (GHS05: Corrosive) (GHS07: Exclamation mark)
Signal word	Warning
Hazard statements	H225, H302, H314, H317, H332, H412
Precautionary statements	P210, P233, P240, P241, P242, P243, P260, P264, P264+P265, P270, P271, P272, P273, P280, P301+P317, P301+P330+P331, P302+P352, P302+P361+P354, P303+P361+P353, P304+P340, P305+P354+P338, P316, P317, P321, P330, P333+P317, P362+P364, P363, P370+P378, P403+P235, P405, P501
- Except where otherwise noted, data are given for materials in their standard state (at 25 °C [77 °F], 100 kPa). Infobox references

Cyclopropylamine is the organic compound with the formula C_{3}H_{5}NH_{2}. It is a simple amine derivative of cyclopropane. As a precursor to pesticides and pharmaceuticals, it is produced on a multi-ton scale from the carboxamide. Cyclopropylamine is first member of the aminocycloalkanes, which includes cyclobutylamine, cyclopentylamine, and cyclohexylamine.

== Cyclopropylamines ==
Many aminocyclopropanes are known, most prominently the amino acid aminocyclopropane-1-carboxylic acid.

The cyclopropylamine group is featured in several pharmaceutical drugs:

- Simeprevir, used to treat hepatitis C infections
- Risdiplam, used to treat spinal muscular atrophy
- ciprofloxacin, an antibiotic.

Cyclopropylamines can be prepared by the Kulinkovich reaction, by dialkylation of bromonitromethane, and various cyclopropanations.
