= Cyclobutylamine =

Names
- Other names aminocyclobutane

Identifiers
CAS Number	2516-34-9
3D model (JSmol)	Interactive image
ChemSpider	68166
ECHA InfoCard	100.017.942
EC Number	219-736-0
PubChem CID	75645
UNII	HFH6FE5D4Y
CompTox Dashboard (EPA)	DTXSID00870982
- InChI: InChI=1S/C4H9N/c5-4-2-1-3-4/h4H,1-3,5H2 Key: KZZKOVLJUKWSKX-UHFFFAOYSA-N
- SMILES: C1CC(C1)N

Properties
Chemical formula	C_{4}H_{9}N
Molar mass	71.123 g·mol^{−1}
Appearance	colorless liquid
Boiling point	80.5–81.5 °C (176.9–178.7 °F; 353.6–354.6 K)
Refractive index (n_{D})	1.4356

Hazards
- GHS labelling
Pictograms	(GHS02: Flammable) (GHS05: Corrosive)
Signal word	Danger
Hazard statements	H225, H314
Precautionary statements	P210, P233, P240, P241, P242, P243, P260, P264, P280, P301+P330+P331, P302+P361+P354, P303+P361+P353, P304+P340, P305+P354+P338, P316, P321, P363, P370+P378, P403+P235, P405, P501
- Except where otherwise noted, data are given for materials in their standard state (at 25 °C [77 °F], 100 kPa). Infobox references

Cyclobutylamine is an organic compound with the formula C_{4}H_{7}NH_{2}. It is a colorless, readily distillable liquid. It can be prepared from cyclobutanecarboxylic acid via a modified Curtius rearrangement. Cyclobutylamine is a member of the aminocycloalkanes, which also includes cyclopropylamine, cyclopentylamine, and cyclohexylamine.

Oxidation with potassium permanganate gives cyclobutanone.

Substituted bicyclobutanes can be converted to a variety of N-substituted cyclobutylamines.
