= Sergey Lebedev (chemist) =

Russian and Soviet chemist (1874–1934)

- Сергей Лебедев
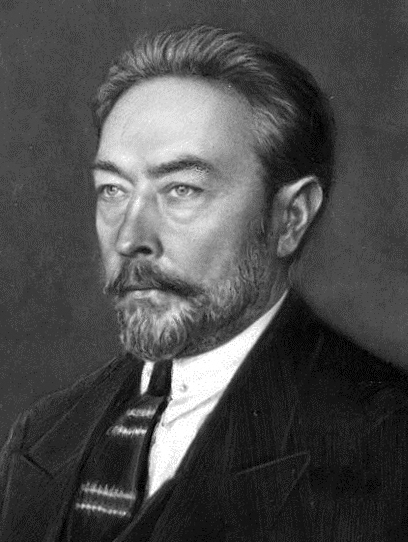
- Lebedev in 1920
- Born: 13 July 1874; Lublin, Congress Poland, Russian Empire
- Died: 2 May 1934 (aged 59); Leningrad, Russian SFSR, Soviet Union
- Resting place: Tikhvin Cemetery, Saint Petersburg
- Education: St. Petersburg University
- Spouse: Anna Ostroumova-Lebedeva (m. 1905)
- Scientific career
- Institutions: Saint Petersburg Academy for Military Medicine
- Doctoral advisor: Alexey Favorsky

Sergei Vasilievich Lebedev (Russian: Сергей Васильевич Лебедев; 13 July 1874 – 2 May 1934) was a Russian and Soviet chemist and the inventor of polybutadiene synthetic rubber, the first commercially viable and mass-produced type of synthetic rubber.

== Biography ==
Lebedev was born on 13 July 1874, in Lublin. He attended school in Warsaw. In 1900, he graduated from St. Petersburg University and found work at the Petersburg Margarine Factory.

Starting in 1902, Lebedev moved from university to university in Russia, starting at the Saint-Petersburg Institute for Railroad Engineering. In 1904, he returned to St. Petersburg University to work under Alexey Favorsky (Stalin Prize, 1941, for contributions to the manufacture of synthetic rubber).

In 1905, he married his second wife, the artist Anna Ostroumova-Lebedeva.

In 1915, Lebedev was appointed Professor at the Women's Pedagogical Institute in St. Petersburg. After 1916, he was a Professor of the Saint Petersburg Academy for Military Medicine. In 1925, he became the leader of the Oil Laboratory (after 1928, the Laboratory of Synthetic Resins) at St. Petersburg University.

He died on 2 May 1934, aged 59, in Leningrad, and is interred in Tikhvin Cemetery.

== Works ==
Lebedev's main works are devoted to polymerisation of diene hydrocarbons. He was the first to research the polymerisation of butadiene (1910–1913). In 1910, Lebedev was the first to get synthetic rubber based on polybutadiene. His book Research in polymerisation of by-ethylene hydrocarbons (1913) became the bible for studies of synthetic rubber.

After 1914, he studied polymerisation of ethylene monomers, leading to modern industrial methods for manufacturing of butyl synthetic rubber and poly-isobutylene. Between 1926 and 1928, he developed a single-stage method for manufacturing butadiene out of ethanol. In 1928, he developed an industrial method for producing synthetic rubber based on polymerisation of butadiene using metallic sodium as a catalyst. This method became the base for the Soviet industry of synthetic rubber. The Soviets lacked reliable access to natural rubber, making the manufacture of synthetic rubber important. The first three synthetic rubber plants were launched in 1932–33. For butadiene production they used grain or potato ethanol as a feedstock. It caused a number of jokes about "Russian method of making tires from potatoes".

By 1940, the Soviet Union had the largest synthetic rubber industry in the world, producing more than 50,000 tons per year. During World War II, Lebedev's process of obtaining butadiene from ethyl alcohol was also used by the German rubber industry.

Another important contribution of Lebedev's was the study of the kinetics of hydrogenation of ethylene hydrocarbons and the development of a number of synthetic motor oils for aircraft engines.

== Honors ==
- In 1931, Lebedev was awarded the Order of Lenin for his work on synthetic rubber
- In 1932, he became a full member of the Soviet Academy of Sciences.
- In 1945 the National Institute for Synthetic Rubber was named "Lebedev's Institute".
