= Anna Ostroumova-Lebedeva =

Russian artist (1871-1955)

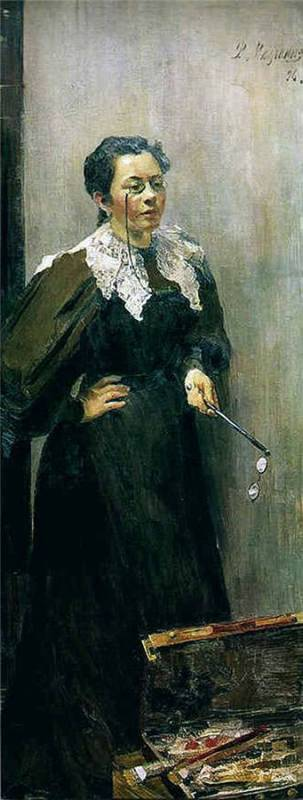
Portrait by Filipp Malyavin (1896)

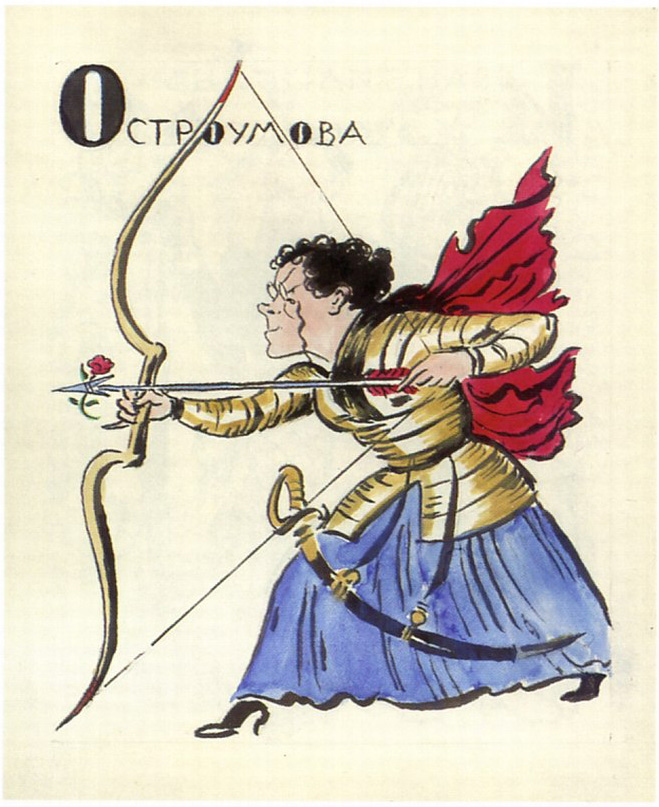
Ostrumova-Lebedeva as the letter О in "Mir iskusstva ABC" by Mstislav Dobuzhinsky

Anna Petrovna Ostroumova-Lebedeva (Russian: Анна Петровна Остроумова-Лебедева; 17 May 1871 — 5 May 1955) was a Russian draughtsman and painter during the Modernist period, active in St. Petersburg (later Leningrad). Part of the Mir Iskusstva society, Ostroumova-Lebedeva is primarily remembered for her woodcut cityscapes.

== Biography ==
She was born as Anna Ostroumova in Saint Petersburg. In 1905, she married the chemist Sergey Lebedev, her maternal cousin.

She studied painting at the Stieglitz School of Technical Drawing under Vasily Mate, and subsequently at the Imperial Academy of Arts under Mate and Ilya Repin. The academy only started to accept women in 1892, and Ostroumova was one of the first women alumni. In 1898 and 1899 she studied in Paris at the Académie Colarossi, and also with James McNeill Whistler at the Académie Carmen. In 1900, Ostroumova graduated from the academy, specializing on graphics, and at the same year joined the Mir iskusstva art group in Saint Petersburg. In 1901, she produced the first series of woodcuts with Saint Petersburg cityscapes, ordered by Sergei Diaghilev.

In the 1900s—1910s she extensively travelled around Europe and also worked as a book illustrator.

Since 1934, she worked as a professor in the Leningrad Institute of Painting, Architecture, and Sculpture. Ostroumova-Lebedeva survived the Siege of Leningrad, but sometime after that became blind. She died in 1955 in Leningrad.

The main topic of her graphic works, both woodcuts and watercolors, were cityscapes of Saint Petersburg. She was also interested in European cityscapes, resulting from her travels in Europe.

== Selected paintings ==
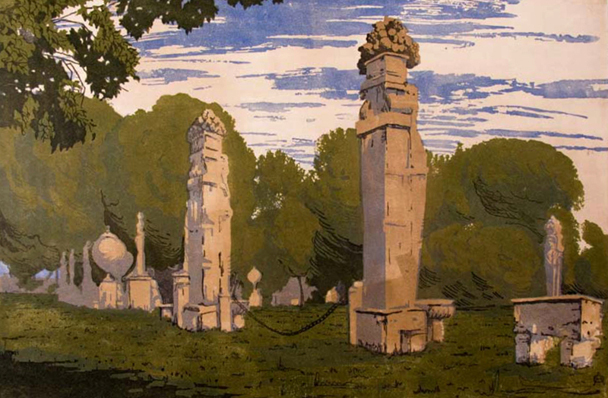
"Villa Borghese", 1904

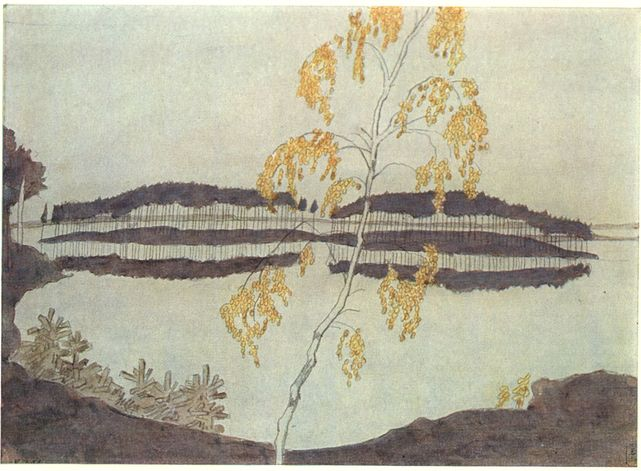
"Two Islands and a birch", 1908

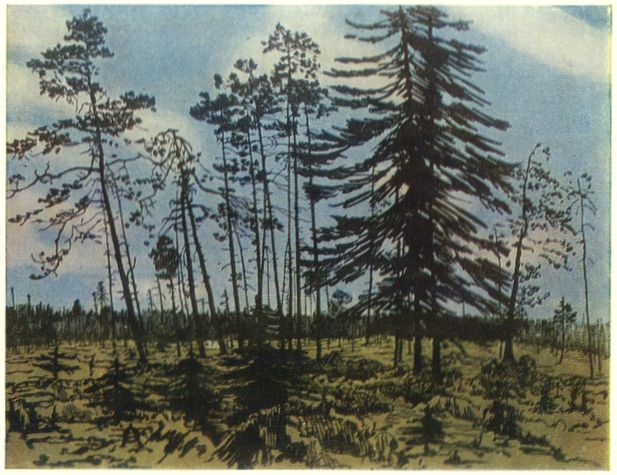
"In Finland", 1910
