= Homo-Favorskii rearrangement =

Rearrangement of β-halo ketones and cyclobutanones

Favorskii rearrangement
| Named after | Alexei Yevgrafovich Favorskii |
| Reaction type | Rearrangement reaction |

Identifiers
| Organic Chemistry Portal | homo-favorsky-reaction |

The homo Favorskii rearrangement is the rearrangement of β-halo ketones and cyclobutanones, which in ring systems may yield ring contraction. This rearrangement takes place in the presence of a base, yielding a carboxylic acid derivative corresponding to the nucleophile (most often the base itself). E1cb will occur if α-carbon adjacent to the halogen atom has hydrogens on it.

== Reaction mechanism ==
The reaction proceeds in an analogous manner to that of the Favorskii rearrangement. The major difference is that the cyclopropanone intermediate is replaced by a cyclobutanone intermediate, and therefore the intermediate's formation cannot be viewed as a 2-electron electrocyclization reaction.

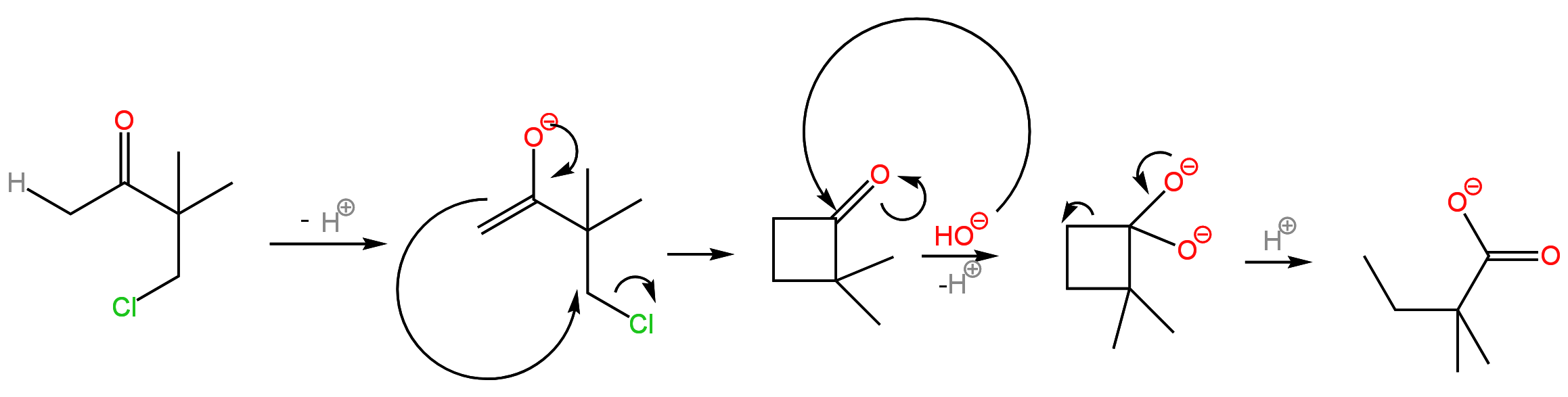

The selectivity is similar to the Favorskii rearrangement in that the most stable carbanion is formed.

== Examples ==
The homo-Favorskii rearrangement is a key step in the synthesis of Kelsoene, constructing its four-membered ring. In this particular example, the nucleophile is absent and the base, t-BuOK, is very bulky. Therefore, the cyclobutanone intermediate can be isolated and is further reacted to yield the product.

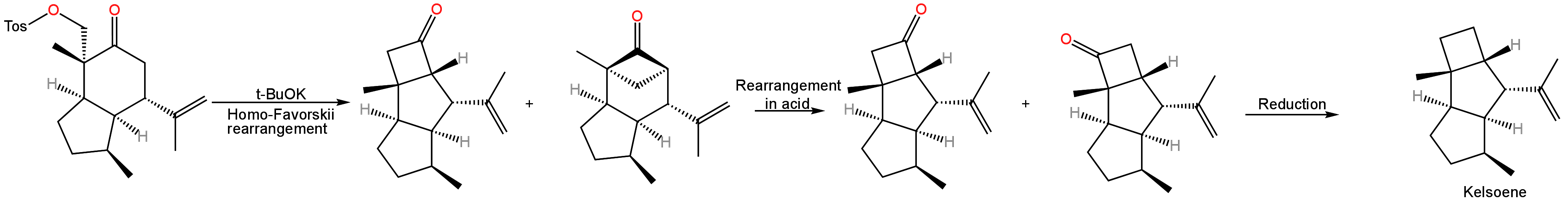
Kelsoene synthesis with homo-Favorskii key step

== See also ==
- Favorskii rearrangement
