= 1,1-Bis(chloromethyl)ethylene =

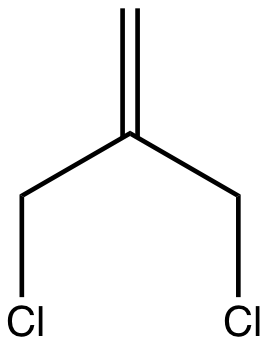

Names
- Preferred IUPAC name 3-Chloro-2-(chloromethyl)prop-1-ene
- Other names 3-Chloro-2-(chloromethyl)propene, 1,1-Bis(chloromethyl)ethene

Identifiers
CAS Number	1871-57-4
3D model (JSmol)	Interactive image
ChEMBL	ChEMBL160833
ChemSpider	15073
ECHA InfoCard	100.015.900
EC Number	217-489-3
PubChem CID	15859
UNII	1XTP1GFW2A
CompTox Dashboard (EPA)	DTXSID3022166
- InChI: InChI=1S/C4H6Cl2/c1-4(2-5)3-6/h1-3H2 Key: XJFZOSUFGSANIF-UHFFFAOYSA-N
- SMILES: C=C(CCl)CCl

Properties
Chemical formula	C_{4}H_{6}Cl_{2}
Molar mass	124.99 g·mol^{−1}
Appearance	Colorless liquid
Density	1.1782 g/cm^{3}
Melting point	−14 °C (7 °F; 259 K)
Boiling point	138 °C (280 °F; 411 K)

Hazards
- Occupational safety and health (OHS/OSH)
Main hazards	alkylating agent
- GHS labelling
Pictograms	(GHS02: Flammable) (GHS06: Toxic) (GHS07: Exclamation mark) (GHS09: Environmental hazard)
Signal word	Danger
Hazard statements	H226, H301, H315, H319, H335, H400
Precautionary statements	P210, P233, P240, P241, P242, P243, P261, P264, P270, P271, P273, P280, P301+P310, P302+P352, P303+P361+P353, P304+P340, P305+P351+P338, P312, P321, P330, P332+P313, P337+P313, P362, P370+P378, P391, P403+P233, P403+P235, P405, P501
- Except where otherwise noted, data are given for materials in their standard state (at 25 °C [77 °F], 100 kPa). Infobox references

1,1-Bis(chloromethyl)ethylene is the organic compound with the formula CH_{2}=C(CH_{2}Cl)_{2}. It is a colorless liquid. Featuring two allylic chloride substituents, it is dialkylating agent.

== Synthesis and reactions ==
It is prepared from pentaerythritol via a multistep procedure, beginning with the partial chlorination. The compound reacts with diiron nonacarbonyl to give the complex of trimethylenemethane Fe(η^{4}-C(CH_{2})_{3})(CO)_{3}. It is also a precursor to [1.1.1]-propellane.
