= Favorskii reaction =

Chemical reaction

The Favorskii reaction is an organic chemistry reaction between an alkyne and a carbonyl group, under basic conditions. The reaction was discovered in the early 1900s by the Russian chemist Alexei Yevgrafovich Favorskii.

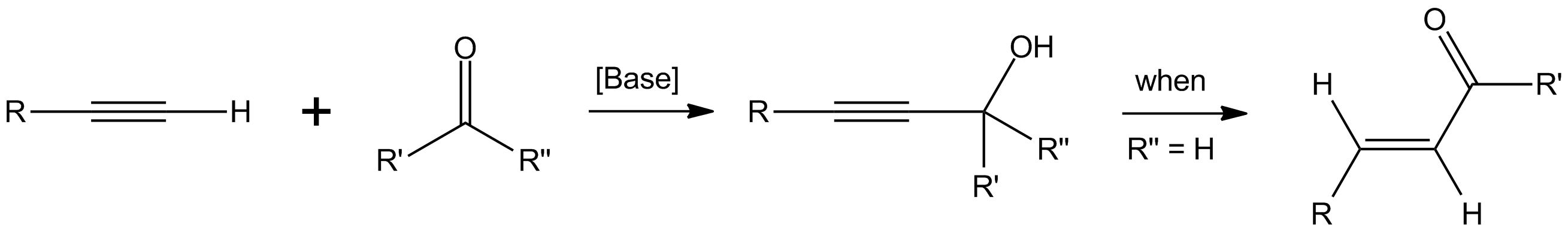
Favorskii reaction and the possible subsequent rearrangement

When the carbonyl is an aldehyde (R"=H), a rearrangement can occur to generate enone, although the secondary propargylic alcohol can be isolated in some cases. When this rearrangement is catalyzed by an acid, it is called Meyer–Schuster rearrangement. When the base is sodium metal the reaction is called Nef synthesis.

== Reaction mechanism and scope ==
A metal acetylide is formed in situ when an alkyne is treated with a strong bases such as a hydroxide or an alkoxide:

1. HC≡CH + KOH ⇌ HC≡CK + H_{2}O
2. RR'C=O + HC≡CK ⇌ RR'C(OK)C≡CH

The metal acetylide then reacts with an aldehyde or ketone to form a propargyl alcohol. When an α-hydrogen is present (as is the case when the carbonyl is an aldehyde), it will tautomerize to the corresponding enone.

The applicable substrates that undergo a Favorskii reaction are limited when compared to the conventional reaction because using an excess of hydroxide base introduces aldol condensation as a more significant competing side reaction. Since enolates do not react with acetylene, the reaction can be often be a poor substitute for the conventional reaction, especially when reaction is used on aldehydes. Successful reactions with aldehydes often require special solvents to be used, such as DMSO or 1,2-dimethoxyethane with a trace amount of ethanol. Additionally, LiOH fails to form the necessary adduct with alkynes to initiate the reaction.

Hydroxide bases are inexpensive relative to generating an alkoxide or acetylide with reagents such as elemental lithium, sodium, or potassium. Additionally, the stringent reaction conditions used by most alternatives, such as excluding moisture and atmospheric oxygen, are less important, making the reaction easier to perform.

== Protecting group ==
This reaction is used to protect alkynes: the alkyne is either converted with acetone to a 2-hydroxyprop-2-yl-alkyne or a protected alkyne can be directly synthesized using the commercially available 2-methyl-3-butyn-2-ol as an alkyne source. The protective group can be removed by heating the compound in a solution of potassium hydroxide in propan-2-ol (a retro-Favorskii reaction).

== See also ==
- Alkynation
- Prins reaction - an addition reaction between an alkene and a carbonyl group, usually under acidic conditions
