= Alexey Favorsky =

Russian chemist

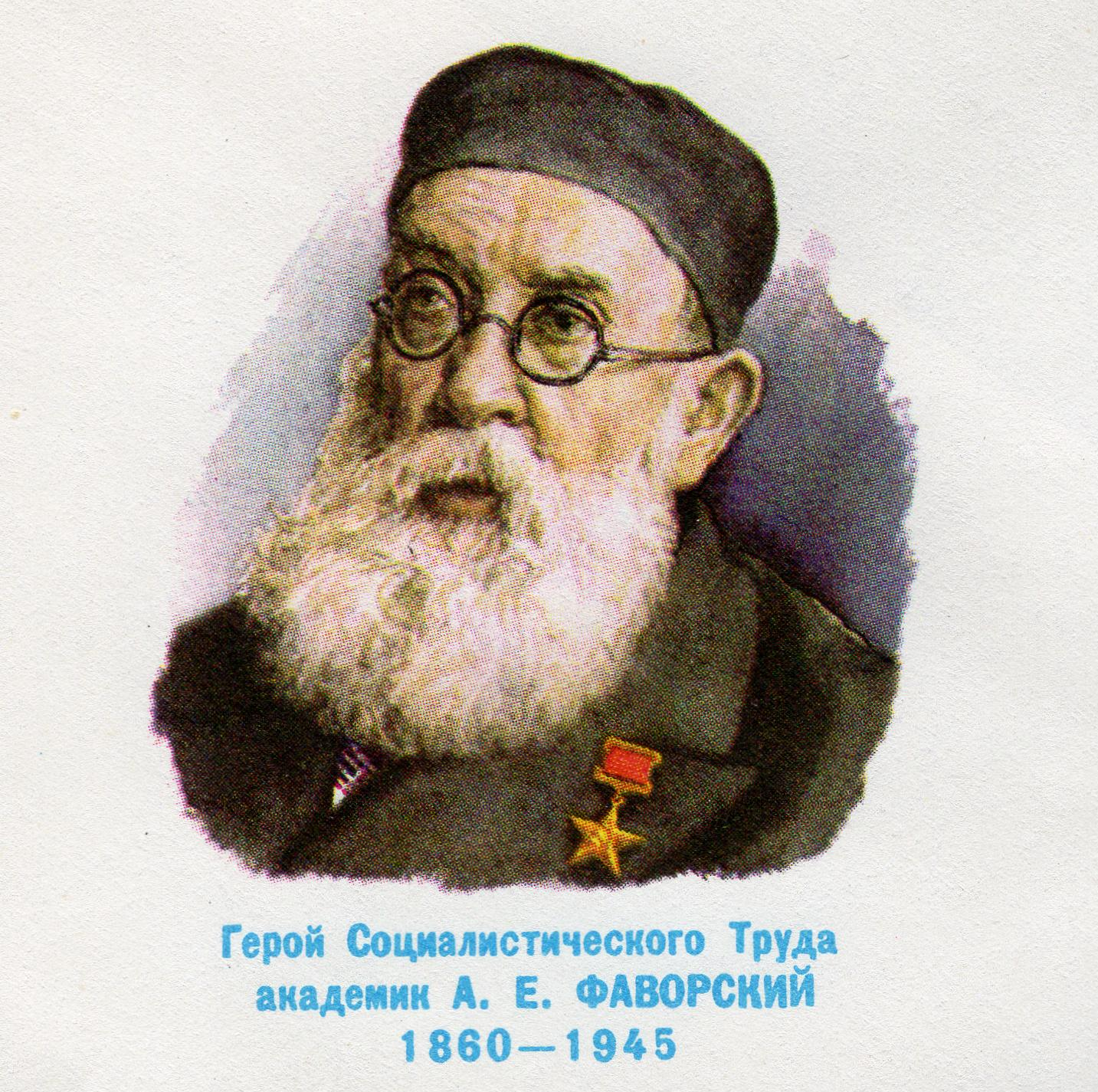
- A depiction of Favorsky as it appeared on a 1979 envelope
- Born: 3 March [O.S. 20 February] 1860; Pavlovo, Nizhny Novgorod Governorate, Russian Empire
- Died: 8 August 1945 (aged 85); Leningrad, Russian SFSR, Soviet Union
- Education: University of Moscow, University of Saint Petersburg
- Known for: Favorskii rearrangement, Favorskii reaction, Synthetic rubber
- Awards: Stalin Prize
- Scientific career
- Doctoral advisor: Alexander Butlerov
- Doctoral students: Sergei Vasiljevich Lebedev, Vladimir Ipatieff

Alexey Yevgrafovich Favorsky (Russian: Алексе́й Евгра́фович Фаво́рский; 3 March [O.S. 20 February] 1860 – 8 August 1945), was a Russian and Soviet chemist and recipient of the Stalin Prize (1941) and the title Hero of Socialist Labour (1945).

== Life ==
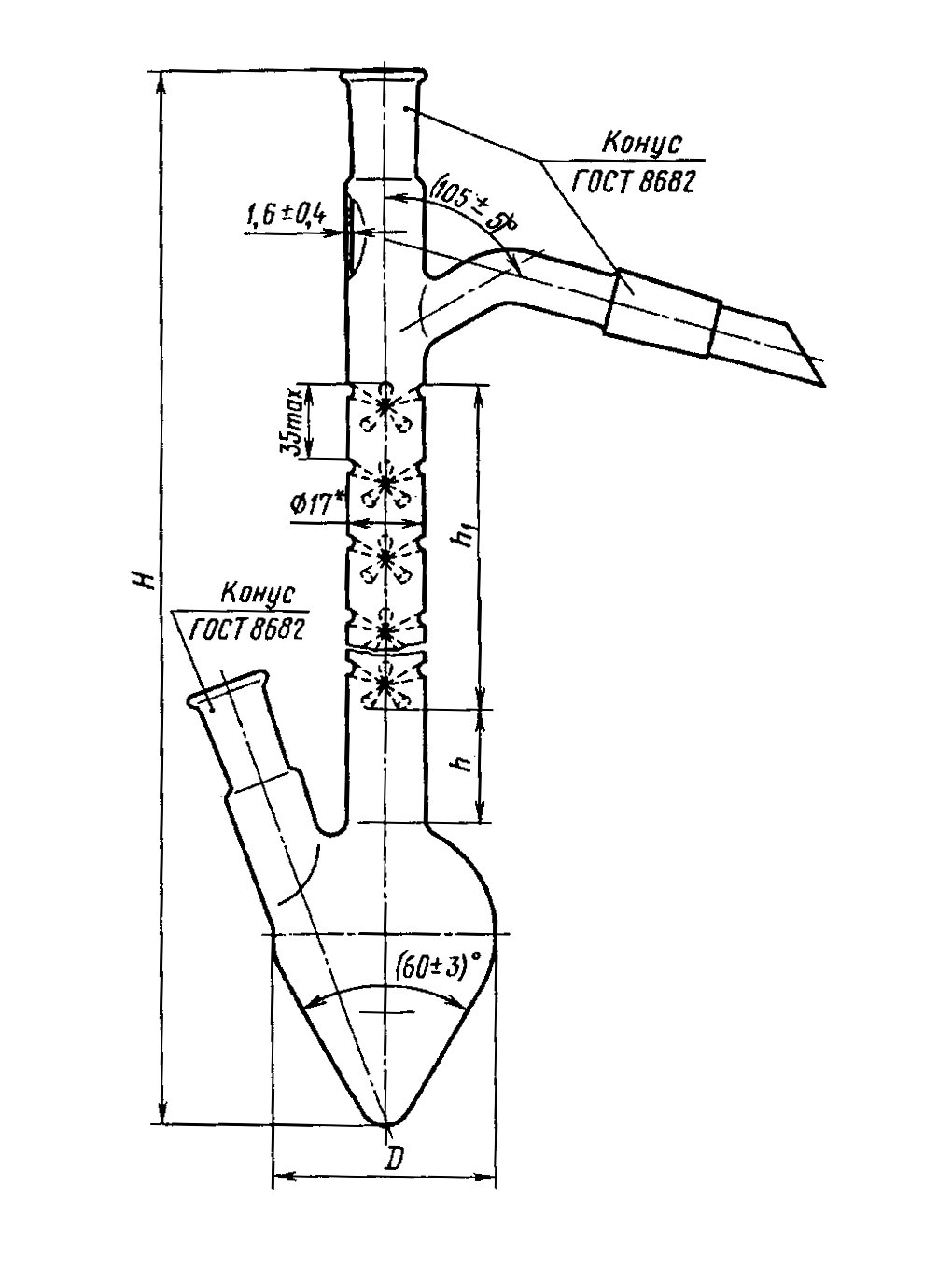
The Favorsky flask

Favorsky studied chemistry at the imperial Saint Petersburg State University from 1878 to 1882. He joined Alexander Butlerov's laboratory for several years, and in 1891 became a lecturer. In 1895, Favorksy received his PhD and became professor for technical chemistry. His discovery of the Favorskii rearrangement in 1894 and the Favorskii reaction between 1900 and 1905 are connected to his name. He worked at the new organics department from 1897, and served as its director from 1934 to 1937. For his improvement of the production of synthetic rubber, Favorsky was awarded the Stalin Prize in 1941.

The artist Vladimir Favorsky was his nephew.

Favorsky died in 1945 and was buried at the Volkovskoye Orthodox cemetery.
