= Cyclobutanecarboxylic acid =

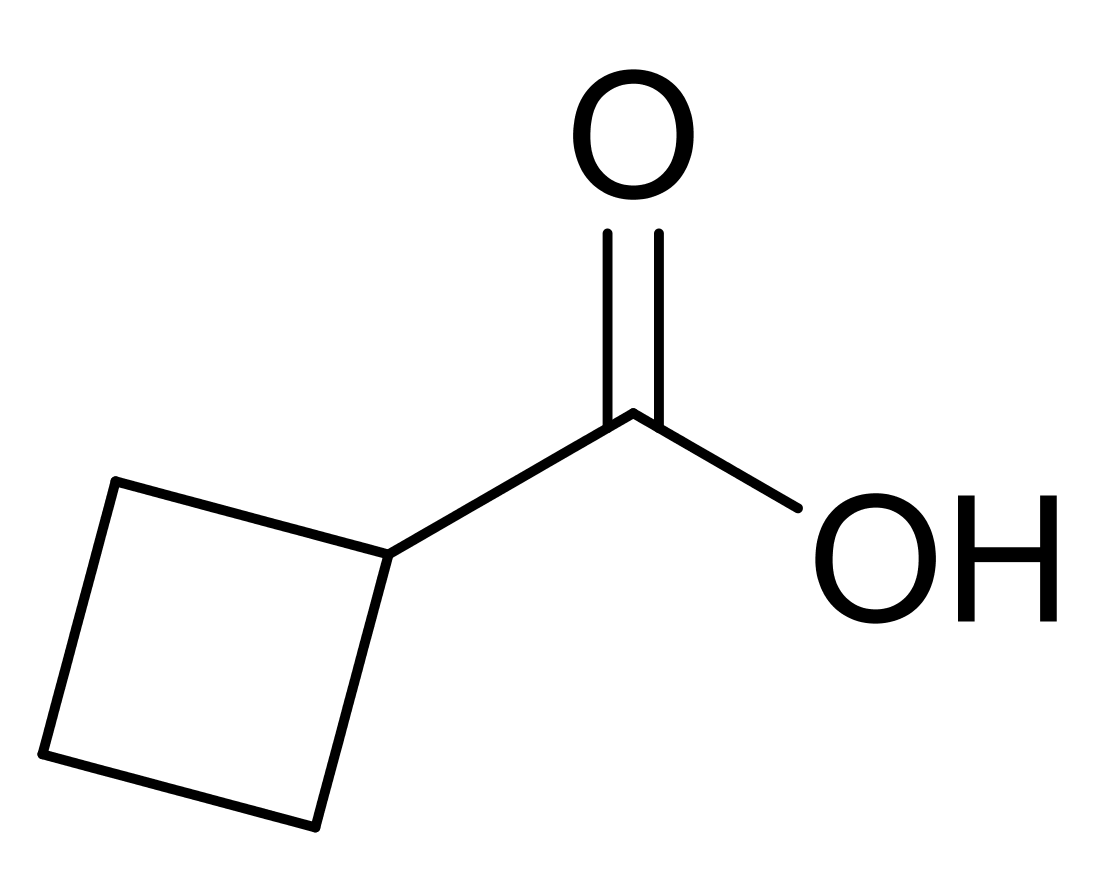

Identifiers
CAS Number	3721-95-7
3D model (JSmol)	Interactive image
ChEMBL	ChEMBL3560137
ChemSpider	18370
ECHA InfoCard	100.020.975
EC Number	223-072-7
PubChem CID	19494
UNII	0RDJ7C51O0
CompTox Dashboard (EPA)	DTXSID3057725
- InChI: InChI=1S/C5H8O2/c6-5(7)4-2-1-3-4/h4H,1-3H2,(H,6,7) Key: TXWOGHSRPAYOML-UHFFFAOYSA-N
- SMILES: C1CC(C1)C(=O)O

Properties
Chemical formula	C_{5}H_{8}O_{2}
Molar mass	100.117 g·mol^{−1}
Appearance	colorless liquid
Melting point	−7.5 °C (18.5 °F; 265.6 K)
Boiling point	191.5–193.5 °C (376.7–380.3 °F; 464.6–466.6 K) 740 mm

Hazards
- GHS labelling
Pictograms	(GHS05: Corrosive) (GHS07: Exclamation mark)
Signal word	Danger
Hazard statements	H302, H312, H314, H332
Precautionary statements	P260, P264, P270, P271, P280, P301+P317, P301+P330+P331, P302+P352, P302+P361+P354, P304+P340, P305+P354+P338, P316, P317, P321, P330, P362+P364, P363, P405, P501
- Except where otherwise noted, data are given for materials in their standard state (at 25 °C [77 °F], 100 kPa). Infobox references

Cyclobutanecarboxylic acid is the organic compound with the formula C_{4}H_{7}CO_{2}H. It is a colorless nonvolatile liquid. It can be prepared by decarboxylation of 1,1-cyclobutanedicarboxylic acid. Cyclobutanecarboxylic acid is an intermediate in organic synthesis. For example, it is a precursor to cyclobutylamine.
