= Methylenecyclopropane =

Organic compound, (CH2)2C=CH2

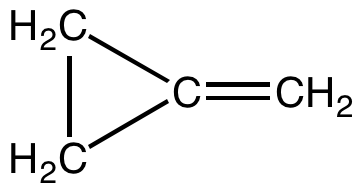

Names
- Preferred IUPAC name Methylidenecyclopropane

Identifiers
| CAS Number | 6142-73-0 |
| 3D model (JSmol) | Interactive image |
| ChemSpider | 72487 |
| ECHA InfoCard | 100.025.584 |
| PubChem CID | 80245 |
| UNII | NC8LG5TD4N |
| CompTox Dashboard (EPA) | DTXSID20210361 |
- InChI: InChI=1S/C4H6/c1-4-2-3-4/h1-3H2 Key: XSGHLZBESSREDT-UHFFFAOYSA-N; InChI=1/C4H6/c1-4-2-3-4/h1-3H2 Key: XSGHLZBESSREDT-UHFFFAOYAB
- SMILES: C=C1CC1

Properties
| Chemical formula | C_{4}H_{6} |
| Molar mass | 54.092 g·mol^{−1} |
| Density | 0.8 g/cm^{3} |
| Boiling point | 9 to 12 °C (48 to 54 °F; 282 to 285 K) |
- Except where otherwise noted, data are given for materials in their standard state (at 25 °C [77 °F], 100 kPa). Infobox references

Methylenecyclopropane is an organic compound with the formula (CH_{2})_{2}C=CH_{2}. It is a hydrocarbon which, as the name suggests, is derived from the addition of a methylene (=CH_{2}) substituent to a cyclopropane ring. It is a colourless, easily condensed gas that is used as a reagent in organic synthesis.

== Synthesis ==
Methylenecyclopropane can be synthesized via an intramolecular cyclisation reaction from methallyl chloride by treatment with a strong base such sodium amide—sodium tert-butoxide (yield 43%) or sodium bis(trimethylsilyl)amide with further treatment by sodium tert-butoxide (yield 72%). Sodium tert-butoxide is used to isomerize byproduct 1-methylcyclopropene into methylenecyclopropane.

== Reactions ==
Being a strained and unsaturated molecule methylenecyclopropane undergoes many reactions, especially in the presence of metal catalysts. For example, methylenecyclopropanes can be converted to cyclobutenes in the presence of a platinum catalyst. This can be considered similar to the ring expansion seen in vinylcyclopropane rearrangements

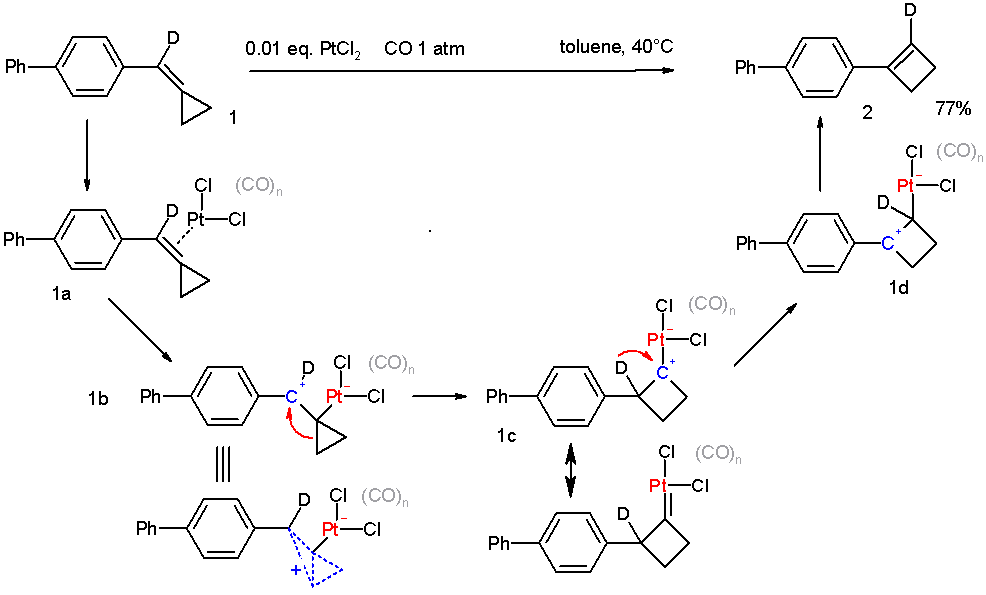

Substituted methylenecyclopropanes can also be involved in trimethylenemethane cycloaddition reactions.

== See also ==
- Methylenecyclopropene
- 1-Methylcyclopropene
- Methylcyclopropane
- Cyclopropene
