= Cyclopentylamine =

Names
- Other names Aminocyclopentane

Identifiers
CAS Number	1003-03-8
3D model (JSmol)	Interactive image
ChEMBL	ChEMBL1171859
ChemSpider	2803
ECHA InfoCard	100.012.452
EC Number	213-697-3
PubChem CID	2906
UNII	4259VRY3GN
CompTox Dashboard (EPA)	DTXSID4061387
- InChI: InChI=1S/C5H11N/c6-5-3-1-2-4-5/h5H,1-4,6H2 Key: NISGSNTVMOOSJQ-UHFFFAOYSA-N
- SMILES: C1CCC(C1)N

Properties
Chemical formula	C_{5}H_{11}N
Molar mass	85.150 g·mol^{−1}
Appearance	Colorless liquid
Density	0.8512 g/cm^{3}
Melting point	−82.7 °C (−116.9 °F; 190.5 K)
Boiling point	106–8 °C (223–46 °F; 379–281 K) 750 Torr
Acidity (pK_{a})	10.65 (conjugate acid)

Hazards
- GHS labelling
Pictograms	(GHS02: Flammable) (GHS05: Corrosive) (GHS06: Toxic) (GHS07: Exclamation mark)
Signal word	Danger
Hazard statements	H225, H300, H314, H315, H317, H331, H332, H412
Precautionary statements	P210, P233, P240, P241, P242, P243, P260, P264, P264+P265, P270, P271, P272, P273, P280, P301+P316, P301+P330+P331, P302+P352, P302+P361+P354, P303+P361+P353, P304+P340, P305+P354+P338, P316, P317, P321, P330, P333+P317, P362+P364, P363, P370+P378, P403+P233, P403+P235, P405, P501
- Except where otherwise noted, data are given for materials in their standard state (at 25 °C [77 °F], 100 kPa). Infobox references

Cyclopentylamine is an organic compound with the formula C_{5}H_{9}NH_{2}. It is a colorless, readily distillable liquid. Cyclopentylamine is a member of the aminocycloalkanes, which also includes cyclopropylamine, cyclobutylamine, and cyclohexylamine.

Cyclopentylamine can be prepared by reductive amination starting with cyclopentanone or cyclopentanol.
