= Ketone =

Organic compounds of the form >C=O

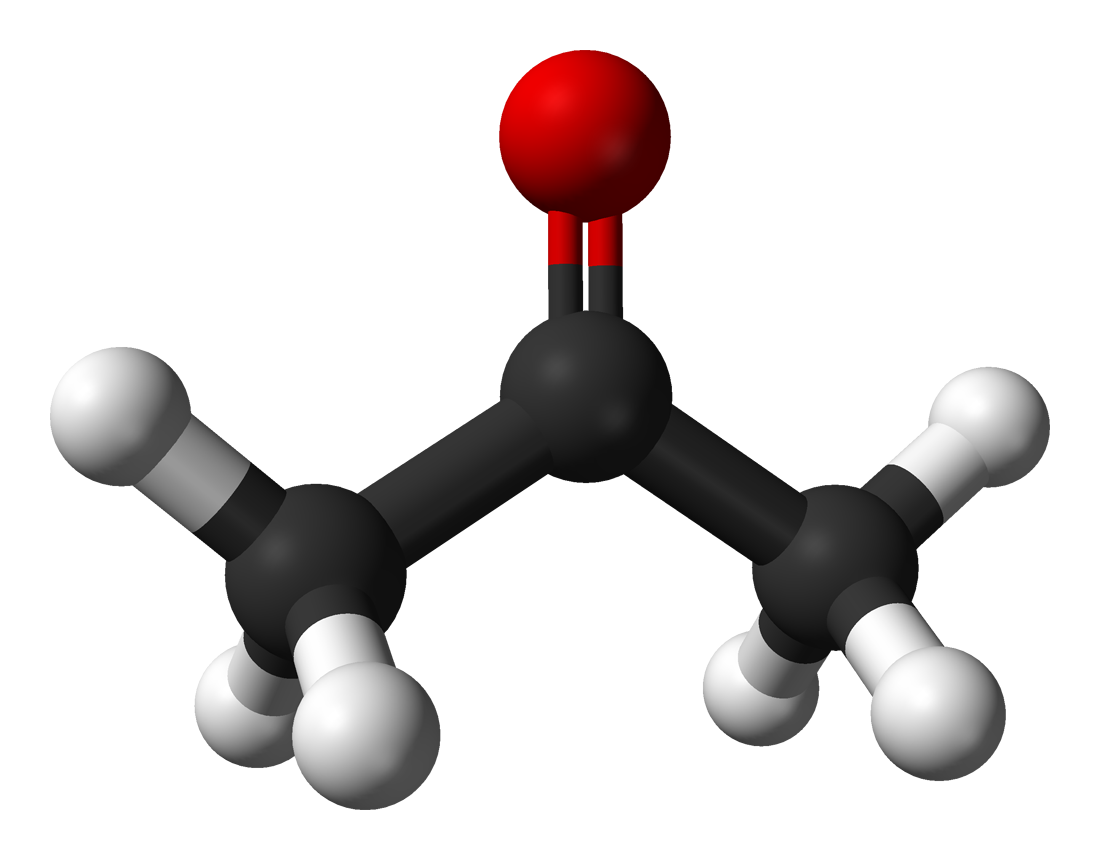
Acetone, the simplest ketone

In organic chemistry, a ketone /ˈkiːtoʊn/ is an organic compound with the structure R−C(=O)−R', where R and R' can be a variety of carbon-containing substituents. Ketones contain a carbonyl group −C(=O)− (a carbon-oxygen double bond C=O). A ketone derived from an alkane is an alkanone. The simplest ketone is acetone (where R and R' are methyl), with the formula (CH_{3})_{2}CO. Many ketones are of great importance in biology and industry. Examples include many sugars (ketoses), many steroids, e.g., testosterone, and the solvent acetone.

== Nomenclature and etymology ==
The word ketone is derived from Aketon, an old German word for acetone.

According to the rules of IUPAC nomenclature, ketone names are derived by changing the suffix -ane of the parent alkane to -anone. Typically, the position of the carbonyl group is denoted by a number, but traditional nonsystematic names are still generally used for the most important ketones, for example acetone and benzophenone. These nonsystematic names are considered retained IUPAC names, although some introductory chemistry textbooks use systematic names such as "2-propanone" or "propan-2-one" for the simplest ketone (CH_{3}−C(=O)−CH_{3}) instead of "acetone".

The derived names of ketones are obtained by writing separately the names of the two alkyl groups attached to the carbonyl group, followed by "ketone" as a separate word. Traditionally the names of the alkyl groups were written in order of increasing complexity, for example methyl ethyl ketone. However, according to the rules of IUPAC nomenclature, the alkyl groups are written alphabetically, for example ethyl methyl ketone. When the two alkyl groups are the same, the prefix "di-" is added before the name of alkyl group. The positions of other groups are indicated by Greek letters, the α-carbon being the atom adjacent to carbonyl group.

Although used infrequently, oxo is the IUPAC nomenclature for the oxo group (=O) and used as prefix when the ketone does not have the highest priority. Other prefixes, however, are also used. For some common chemicals (mainly in biochemistry), keto refer to the ketone functional group.

== Structure and bonding ==
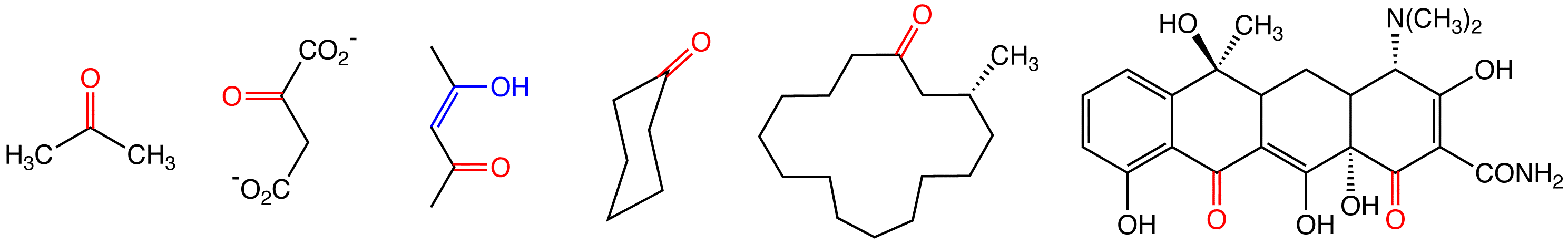
Representative ketones, from the left: acetone, a common solvent; oxaloacetate, an intermediate in the metabolism of sugars; acetylacetone in its (mono) enol form (the enol highlighted in blue); cyclohexanone, precursor to nylon; muscone, an animal scent; and tetracycline, an antibiotic

The ketone carbon is often described as sp^{2} hybridized, a description that includes both their electronic and molecular structure. Ketones are trigonal planar around the ketonic carbon, with C–C–O and C–C–C bond angles of approximately 120°. Ketones differ from aldehydes in that the carbonyl group (C=O) is bonded to two carbons within a carbon skeleton. In aldehydes, the carbonyl is bonded to one carbon and one hydrogen and are located at the ends of carbon chains. Ketones are also distinct from other carbonyl-containing functional groups, such as carboxylic acids, esters and amides.

The carbonyl group is polar because the electronegativity of the oxygen is greater than that for carbon. Thus, ketones are nucleophilic at oxygen and electrophilic at carbon. Because the carbonyl group interacts with water by hydrogen bonding, ketones are typically more soluble in water than the related methylene compounds. Ketones are hydrogen-bond acceptors. Ketones are not usually hydrogen-bond donors and cannot hydrogen-bond to themselves. Because of their inability to serve both as hydrogen-bond donors and acceptors, ketones tend not to "self-associate" and are more volatile than alcohols and carboxylic acids of comparable molecular weights. These factors relate to the pervasiveness of ketones in perfumery and as solvents.

=== Classes of ketones ===
Ketones are classified on the basis of their substituents. One broad classification subdivides ketones into symmetrical and unsymmetrical derivatives, depending on the equivalency of the two organic substituents attached to the carbonyl center. Acetone and benzophenone ((C_{6}H_{5})_{2}CO) are symmetrical ketones. Acetophenone (C_{6}H_{5}C(O)CH_{3}) is an unsymmetrical ketone.

==== Diketones ====
Many kinds of diketones are known, some with unusual properties. The simplest is diacetyl (CH_{3}C(O)C(O)CH_{3}), once used as butter-flavoring in popcorn. Acetylacetone (pentane-2,4-dione) is virtually a misnomer (inappropriate name) because this species exists mainly as the monoenol CH_{3}C(O)CH=C(OH)CH_{3}. Its enolate is a common ligand in coordination chemistry.

==== Unsaturated ketones ====
Ketones containing alkene and alkyne units are often called unsaturated ketones. A widely used member of this class of compounds is methyl vinyl ketone, CH_{3}C(O)CH=CH_{2}, a α,β-unsaturated carbonyl compound.

==== Cyclic ketones ====
Many ketones are cyclic. The simplest class have the formula (CH_{2})_{n}CO, where n varies from 2 for cyclopropanone ((CH_{2})_{2}CO) to the tens. Larger derivatives exist. Cyclohexanone ((CH_{2})_{5}CO), a symmetrical cyclic ketone, is an important intermediate in the production of nylon. Isophorone, derived from acetone, is an unsaturated, asymmetrical ketone that is the precursor to other polymers. Muscone, 3-methylpentadecanone, is an animal pheromone. Another cyclic ketone is cyclobutanone, having the formula (CH_{2})_{3}CO.

== Characterization ==
An aldehyde differs from a ketone in that it has a hydrogen atom attached to its carbonyl group, making aldehydes easier to oxidize. Ketones do not have a hydrogen atom bonded to the carbonyl group, and are therefore more resistant to oxidation. They are oxidized only by powerful oxidizing agents which have the ability to cleave carbon–carbon bonds.

=== Spectroscopy ===
Ketones (and aldehydes) absorb strongly in the infra-red spectrum near 1750 cm^{−1}, which is assigned to ν_{C=O} ("carbonyl stretching frequency"). The energy of the peak is lower for aryl and unsaturated ketones.

Whereas ^{1}H NMR spectroscopy is generally not useful for establishing the presence of a ketone, ^{13}C NMR spectra exhibit signals somewhat downfield of 200 ppm depending on structure. Such signals are typically weak due to the absence of nuclear Overhauser effects. Since aldehydes resonate at similar chemical shifts, multiple resonance experiments are employed to definitively distinguish aldehydes and ketones.

=== Qualitative organic tests ===
Ketones give positive results in Brady's test, the reaction with 2,4-dinitrophenylhydrazine to give the corresponding hydrazone. Ketones may be distinguished from aldehydes by giving a negative result with Tollens' reagent or with Fehling's solution. Methyl ketones give positive results for the iodoform test. Ketones also give positive results when treated with m-dinitrobenzene in presence of dilute sodium hydroxide to give violet coloration.

== Synthesis ==
Many methods exist for the preparation of ketones in industrial scale and academic laboratories. Ketones are also produced in various ways by organisms; see the section on biochemistry below.

In industry, the most important method probably involves oxidation of hydrocarbons, often with air. For example, a billion kilograms of cyclohexanone are produced annually by aerobic oxidation of cyclohexane. Acetone is prepared by air-oxidation of cumene.

For specialized or small scale organic synthetic applications, ketones are often prepared by oxidation of secondary alcohols:

R_{2}CH(OH) + "O" → R_{2}C=O + H_{2}O

Typical strong oxidants (source of "O" in the above reaction) include potassium permanganate or a Cr(VI) compound. Milder conditions make use of the Dess–Martin periodinane or the Moffatt–Swern methods.

Many other methods have been developed, examples include:

- By geminal halide hydrolysis.
- By hydration of alkynes. Such processes occur via enols and require the presence of an acid and mercury(II) sulfate (HgSO_{4}). Subsequent enol–keto tautomerization gives a ketone. This reaction always produces a ketone, even with a terminal alkyne, the only exception being the hydration of acetylene, which produces acetaldehyde.
- From Weinreb amides using stoichiometric organometallic reagents.
- Aryl ketones can be prepared in the Friedel–Crafts acylation, the related Houben–Hoesch reaction, and the Fries rearrangement.
- Ozonolysis, and related dihydroxylation/oxidative sequences, cleave alkenes to give aldehydes or ketones, depending on alkene substitution pattern.
- From peroxides (Kornblum–DeLaMare rearrangement).
- Cyclization of dicarboxylic acids (Ruzicka cyclization)
- Hydrolysis of salts of secondary nitro compounds (Nef reaction)
- Alkylation of thioester with organozinc compounds (Fukuyama coupling).
- Alkylation of acid chloride with organocadmium compounds or organocopper compounds.
- The Dakin–West reaction provides an efficient method for preparation of certain methyl ketones from carboxylic acids.
- Ketones can be prepared by the reaction of Grignard reagents with nitriles, followed by hydrolysis.
- By decarboxylation of carboxylic anhydride.
- Ketones can be prepared from haloketones in reductive dehalogenation of halo ketones.
- In ketonic decarboxylation symmetrical ketones are prepared from carboxylic acids.
- Hydrolysis of unsaturated secondary amides, β-Keto acid esters, or β-diketones (the acetoacetic ester synthesis).
- Acid-catalysed rearrangement of 1,2-diols, or Criegee oxidation of the same.

== Reactions ==
=== Keto-enol tautomerization ===
Keto-enol tautomerism. 1 is the keto form; 2 is the enol.

Ketones that have at least one alpha-hydrogen, undergo keto-enol tautomerization; the tautomer is an enol. Tautomerization is catalyzed by both acids and bases. Usually, the keto form is more stable than the enol. This equilibrium allows ketones to be prepared via the hydration of alkynes.

=== Acid/base properties of ketones ===
C−H bonds adjacent to the carbonyl in ketones are more acidic (pK_{a} ≈ 20) than the C−H bonds in alkane (pK_{a} ≈ 50). This difference reflects resonance stabilization of the enolate ion that is formed upon deprotonation. The relative acidity of the α-hydrogen is important in the enolization reactions of ketones and other carbonyl compounds. The acidity of the α-hydrogen also allows ketones and other carbonyl compounds to react as nucleophiles at that position, with either stoichiometric and catalytic base. Using very strong bases like lithium diisopropylamide (LDA, pK_{a} of conjugate acid ~36) under non-equilibrating conditions (–78 °C, 1.1 equiv LDA in THF, ketone added to base), the less-substituted kinetic enolate is generated selectively, while conditions that allow for equilibration (higher temperature, base added to ketone, using weak or insoluble bases, e.g., CH_{3}CH_{2}ONa in CH_{3}CH_{2}OH, or NaH) provides the more-substituted thermodynamic enolate.

Ketones are also weak bases, undergoing protonation on the carbonyl oxygen in the presence of Brønsted acids. Ketonium ions (i.e., protonated ketones) are strong acids, with pK_{a} values estimated to be somewhere between –5 and –7. Although acids encountered in organic chemistry are seldom strong enough to fully protonate ketones, the formation of equilibrium concentrations of protonated ketones is nevertheless an important step in the mechanisms of many common organic reactions, like the formation of an acetal, for example. Acids as weak as pyridinium cation (as found in pyridinium tosylate) with a pK_{a} of 5.2 are able to serve as catalysts in this context, despite the highly unfavorable equilibrium constant for protonation (K_{eq} < 10^{−10}).

=== Nucleophilic additions ===
An important set of reactions follow from the susceptibility of the carbonyl carbon toward nucleophilic addition and the tendency for the enolates to add to electrophiles. Nucleophilic additions include in approximate order of their generality:

- With water (hydration) gives geminal diols, which are usually not formed in appreciable (or observable) amounts
- With an acetylide to give the α-hydroxyalkyne
- With ammonia or a primary amine gives an imine
- With secondary amine gives an enamine
- With Grignard and organolithium reagents to give, after aqueous workup, a tertiary alcohol
- With an alcohols or alkoxides to gives the hemiketal or its conjugate base. With a diol to the ketal. This reaction is employed to protect ketones.
- With sodium amide resulting in C–C bond cleavage with formation of the amide RCONH_{2} and the alkane or arene R'H, a reaction called the Haller–Bauer reaction.

=== Oxidation ===
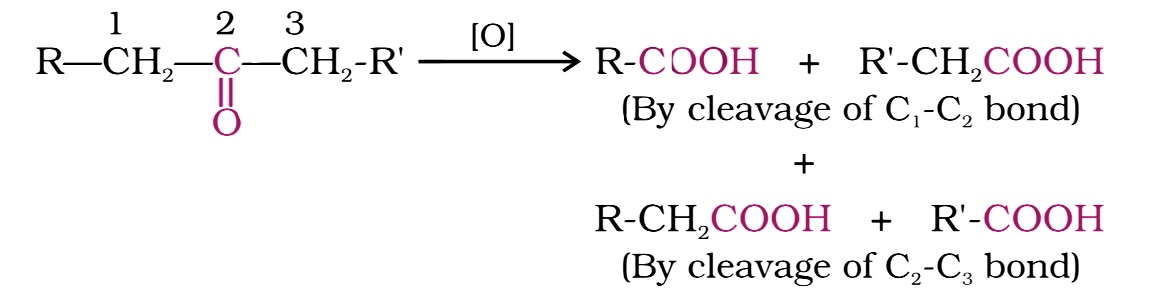

Ketones are cleaved by strong oxidizing agents and at elevated temperatures. Their oxidation involves carbon–carbon bond cleavage to afford a mixture of carboxylic acids having lesser number of carbon atoms than the parent ketone.

=== Other reactions ===
- Electrophilic addition, reaction with an electrophile gives a resonance stabilized cation
- With phosphonium ylides in the Wittig reaction to give the alkenes
- With thiols to give the thioacetal
- With hydrazine or 1-disubstituted derivatives of hydrazine to give hydrazones.
- With a metal hydride gives a metal alkoxide salt, hydrolysis of which gives the alcohol, an example of ketone reduction
- With halogens to form an α-haloketone, a reaction that proceeds via an enol (see Haloform reaction)
- With heavy water to give an α-deuterated ketone
- Fragmentation in photochemical Norrish reaction
- Reaction of 1,4-aminodiketones to oxazoles by dehydration in the Robinson–Gabriel synthesis
- In the case of aryl–alkyl ketones, with sulfur and an amine give amides in the Willgerodt reaction
- With hydroxylamine to produce oximes
- With reducing agents to form secondary alcohols
- With peroxy acids to form esters in the Baeyer–Villiger oxidation

== Biochemistry ==
Ketones do not appear in standard amino acids, nucleic acids, nor lipids. The formation of organic compounds in photosynthesis occurs via the ketone ribulose-1,5-bisphosphate. Many sugars are ketones, known collectively as ketoses. The best known ketose is fructose; it mostly exists as a cyclic hemiketal, which masks the ketone functional group. Fatty acid synthesis proceeds via ketones. Acetoacetate is an intermediate in the Krebs cycle which releases energy from sugars and carbohydrates.

In medicine, acetone, acetoacetate, and beta-hydroxybutyrate are collectively called ketone bodies, generated from carbohydrates, fatty acids, and amino acids in most vertebrates, including humans. Ketone bodies are elevated in the blood (ketosis) after fasting, including a night of sleep; in both blood and urine in starvation; in hypoglycemia, due to causes other than hyperinsulinism; in various inborn errors of metabolism, and intentionally induced via a ketogenic diet, and in ketoacidosis (usually due to diabetes mellitus). Although ketoacidosis is characteristic of decompensated or untreated type 1 diabetes, ketosis or even ketoacidosis can occur in type 2 diabetes in some circumstances as well.

== Applications ==
Ketones are produced on massive scales in industry as solvents, polymer precursors, and pharmaceuticals. In terms of scale, the most important ketones are acetone, methylethyl ketone, and cyclohexanone. They are also common in biochemistry, but less so than in organic chemistry in general. Partial oxidation of hydrocarbons can give ketones as intermediates or products, alongside many other oxygenated compounds.

== Toxicity ==
Although it is difficult to generalize on the toxicity of such a broad class of compounds, simple ketones are, in general, not highly toxic. This characteristic is one reason for their popularity as solvents. Exceptions to this rule are the unsaturated ketones such as methyl vinyl ketone with LD_{50} of 7 mg/kg (oral).

== See also ==
- Diketone
- Ketone bodies
- Ketosis
- Thioketone
- Triketone
- Ynone
