= HMDS =

HMDS may refer to:

- either of two related reagents in organometallic chemistry:
  - Hexamethyldisilazane ([(CH_{3})_{3}Si]_{2}NH)
  - Hexamethyldisilazide ([(CH_{3})_{3}Si]_{2}NM)
    - M = Li as in Lithium bis(trimethylsilyl)amide (LiHMDS)
    - M = Na as in Sodium bis(trimethylsilyl)amide (NaHMDS)
    - M = K as in Potassium bis(trimethylsilyl)amide (KHMDS)
- Hexamethyldisiloxane (O[Si(CH_{3})_{3}]_{2})
- Her Majesty's Diplomatic Service, of the United Kingdom
- Helmet mounted display and sight, a system for military pilots
- Harvest Moon DS, a video game
