= Aldol reaction =

Chemical reaction

Aldol Addition
Reaction type	Coupling reaction

Reaction
Ketone or Aldehyde
+
Ketone or Aldehyde
↓
β-hydroxy Aldehyde
or
β-hydroxy Ketone

Conditions
Temperature	−Δ, ~−70 °C (Note: It is typically best to minimize heat for this reaction. As removal of water from excess heat risks shifting the equilibrium in favor of a dehydration reaction, leading to the aldol condensation product. By avoiding heat, it can help avoid dehydration so that the majority of product produced is the aldol addition product.)
Catalyst	^{−}OH or H^{+}

Identifiers
Organic Chemistry Portal	aldol-addition
RSC ontology ID	RXNO:0000016

The aldol reaction (aldol addition) is a reaction in organic chemistry that combines two carbonyl compounds (e.g. aldehydes or ketones) to form a new β-hydroxy carbonyl compound. Its simplest form might involve the nucleophilic addition of an enolized ketone to another:

Prototype aldol reaction

These products are known as aldols, from the aldehyde + alcohol, a structural motif seen in many of the products. The use of aldehyde in the name comes from its history: aldehydes are more reactive than ketones, so that the reaction was discovered first with them.

The aldol reaction is paradigmatic in organic chemistry and one of the most common means of forming carbon–carbon bonds in organic chemistry. It lends its name to the family of aldol reactions and similar techniques analyze a whole family of carbonyl α-substitution reactions, as well as the diketone condensations.

== Scope ==
Aldol structural units are found in many important molecules, whether naturally occurring or synthetic. The reaction is well used on an industrial scale, notably of pentaerythritol, trimethylolpropane, the plasticizer precursor 2-ethylhexanol, and the drug Lipitor (atorvastatin, calcium salt). For many of the commodity applications, the stereochemistry of the aldol reaction is unimportant, but the topic is of intense interest for the synthesis of many specialty chemicals.

=== Aldol dimerization ===
In its simplest implementation, base induces conversion of an aldehyde or a ketone to the aldol product. One example involves the aldol condensation of propionaldehyde:

2 CH_{3}CH_{2}CHO → CH_{3}CH_{2}CH(OH)CH(CH_{3})CHO

Featuring the RCH(OH)CHR'C(O)R" grouping, the product is an aldol. In this case R = CH_{3}CH_{2}, R' = CH_{3}, and R" = H. Such reactions are called aldol dimerization.

=== Cross-aldol ===
With a mixture of carbonyl precursors, complicated mixtures can occur. Addition of base to a mixture of propionaldehyde and acetaldehyde, one obtains four products:

CH_{3}CH_{2}CH(OH)CH(CH_{3})CHO (from two propionaldehydes), CH_{3}CH(OH)CH_{2}CHO (from two acetaldehydes), and both CH_{3}CH_{2}CH(OH)CH_{2}CHO and CH_{3}CH(OH)CH(CH_{3})CHO

The first two products are the result of aldol dimerization but the latter two result from a crossed aldol reaction. Complicated mixtures from cross aldol reactions can be avoided by using one component that cannot form an enolate, examples being formaldehyde and benzaldehyde. This approach is used in one stage in the production of trimethylolethane, which entails crossed aldol condensation of butyraldehyde and formaldehyde:

CH_{3}CH_{2}CH_{2}CHO + 2 CH_{2}O → CH_{3}CH_{2}C(CH_{2}OH)_{2}CHO

=== Reactions of aldols ===
Aldols dehydrate:

CH_{3}CH_{2}CH(OH)CH(CH_{3})CHO → CH_{3}CH_{2}CH=C(CH_{3})CHO + H_{2}O

Because this conversion is facile, it is sometimes assumed. It is for this reason that the aldol reaction is sometimes called the aldol condensation.

== Mechanisms ==
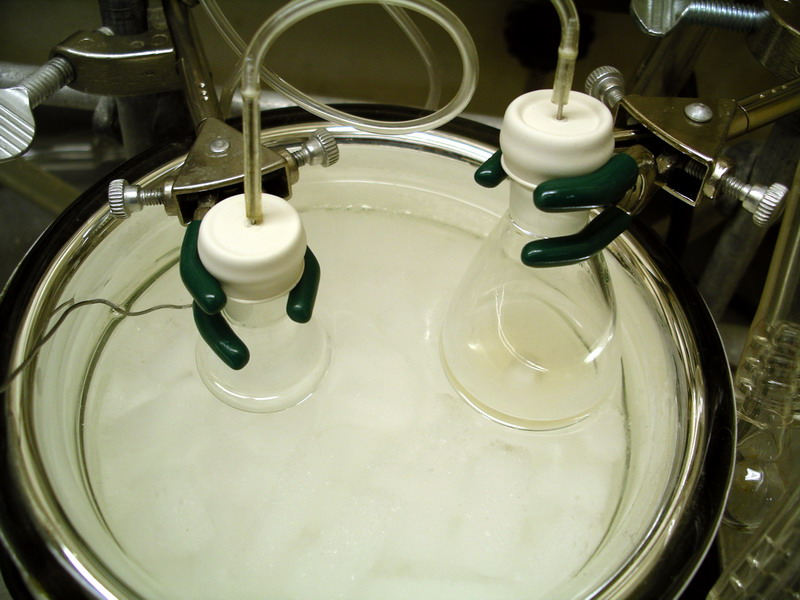
A typical experimental setup for an aldol reaction in a research laboratory. The flask on the right is a solution of lithium diisopropylamide (LDA) in tetrahydrofuran (THF). The flask on the left is a solution of the lithium enolate of tert-butyl propionate (formed by addition of LDA to tert-butyl propionate). An aldehyde can then be added to the enolate flask to initiate an aldol addition reaction. Both flasks are submerged in a dry ice/acetone cooling bath (−78 °C) the temperature of which is being monitored by a thermocouple (the wire on the left).

The aldol reaction has one underlying mechanism: a carbanion-like nucleophile attacks a carbonyl center.

If the base is of only moderate strength such as hydroxide ion or an alkoxide, the aldol reaction occurs via nucleophilic attack by the resonance-stabilized enolate on the carbonyl group of another molecule. The product is the alkoxide salt of the aldol product. The aldol itself is then formed, and it may then undergo dehydration to give the unsaturated carbonyl compound. The scheme shows a simple mechanism for the base-catalyzed aldol reaction of an aldehyde with itself.

Simple mechanism for base-catalyzed aldol reaction of an aldehyde with itself

Although only a catalytic amount of base is required in some cases, the more usual procedure is to use a stoichiometric amount of a strong base such as LDA or NaHMDS. In this case, enolate formation is irreversible, and the aldol product is not formed until the metal alkoxide of the aldol product is protonated in a separate workup step.

When an acid catalyst is used, the initial step in the reaction mechanism involves acid-catalyzed tautomerization of the carbonyl compound to the enol. The acid also serves to activate the carbonyl group of another molecule by protonation, rendering it highly electrophilic. The enol is nucleophilic at the α-carbon, allowing it to attack the protonated carbonyl compound, leading to the aldol after deprotonation. Some may also dehydrate past the intended product to give the unsaturated carbonyl compound through aldol condensation.

Mechanism for acid-catalyzed aldol reaction of an aldehyde with itself

== Crossed-aldol reactant control ==
Despite the attractiveness of the aldol manifold, there are several problems that need to be addressed to render the process effective. The first problem is a thermodynamic one: most aldol reactions are reversible. Furthermore, the equilibrium is also just barely on the side of the products in the case of simple aldehyde–ketone aldol reactions.

A key distinction is whether the conditions dehydrate the product to an enone. In mild conditions (e.g., LDA (a strong base), THF, −78 °C), the (hydrated) product is a aldol, and the base catalyzes retro-aldol cleavage of the product. The reaction must be driven by e.g. distillation. Under harsher conditions (e.g.: NaOMe/MeOH/reflux), the product dehydrates practically irreversibly, and the reaction completes spontaneously. Hydration followed by retro-aldol cleavage is possible, but rare without dedicated catalysis. Dehydration is also the catalytic strategy of class I aldolases and numerous small-molecule amine catalysts.

When a mixture of unsymmetrical ketones are reacted, four crossed-aldol (addition) products can be anticipated:

Crossed aldol (addition) reaction

To obtain only one product, one must control which carbonyl becomes the nucleophilic enol/enolate and which remains in its electrophilic carbonyl form. The simplest control occurs when only one reactant has acidic protons: that molecule must enolize. For example, the addition of diethyl malonate into benzaldehyde produces only one product:

Acidic control of the aldol (addition) reaction

If one group is considerably more acidic than the other, the most acidic proton is abstracted by the base. An enolate is formed at that carbonyl while the less-acidic carbonyl remains electrophilic. This type of control works only if the difference in acidity is large enough and base is the limiting reactant. A typical substrate for this situation is when the deprotonatable position is activated by more than one carbonyl-like group. Common examples include a CH_{2} group flanked by two carbonyls or nitriles (see for example the Knoevenagel condensation and the first steps of the malonic ester synthesis and acetoacetic ester synthesis).

Otherwise, the most acidic carbonyls are typically also the most active electrophiles: first aldehydes, then ketones, then esters, and finally amides. Thus cross-aldehyde reactions are typically most challenging because they can polymerize easily or react unselectively to give a statistical mixture of products.

One common solution assumes kinetic control. In that case, the forward aldol addition is significantly faster than the retro-aldol reverse and faster than enolate transfer from one partner to another. Thus one can first form the desired partner's enolate quantitatively, then simply add the other partner. Common kinetic control conditions involve ketone enolization with LDA at −78 °C, followed by the slow addition of an aldehyde.

== Stereoselectivity ==
The aldol reaction unites two relatively simple molecules into a more complex one. Increased complexity arises because each end of the new bond may become a stereocenter. Modern methodology has not only developed high-yielding aldol reactions, but also completely controls both the relative and absolute configuration of these new stereocenters.

To describe relative stereochemistry at the α- and β-carbon, older papers use saccharide chemistry's erythro/threo nomenclature; more modern papers use the following syn/anti convention. When propionate (or higher order) nucleophiles add to aldehydes, the reader visualizes the R group of the ketone and the R' group of the aldehyde aligned in a "zig zag" pattern on the paper (or screen). The disposition of the formed stereocenters is deemed syn or anti, depending if they are on the same or opposite sides of the main chain:

Syn and anti products from an aldol (addition) reaction

The principal factor determining an aldol reaction's stereoselectivity is the enolizing metal counterion. Shorter metal-oxygen bonds "tighten" the transition state and effects greater stereoselection. Boron is often used because its bond lengths are significantly shorter than other cheap metals (lithium, aluminium, or magnesium). The following reaction gives a syn:anti ratio of 80:20 using a lithium enolate compared to 97:3 using a dibutylboron enolate.

Where the counterion determines stereoinduction strength, the enolate isomer determines its direction. E isomers give anti products and Z give syn:

Anti-aldol formation through E-enolate

Syn-aldol formation through Z-enolate

=== Zimmermann–Traxler model ===
If the two reactants have carbonyls adjacent to a pre-existing stereocenter, then the new stereocenters may form at a fixed orientation relative to the old. This "substrate-based stereocontrol" has seen extensive study and examples pervade the literature. In many cases, a stylized transition state, called the Zimmerman–Traxler model, can predict the new orientation from the configuration of a 6-membered ring.

==== On the enol ====
If the enol has an adjacent stereocenter, then the two stereocenters flanking the carbonyl in the product are naturally syn:

The underlying mechanistic reason depends on the enol isomer. For an E enolate, the stereoinduction is necessary to avoid 1,3-allylic strain, while a Z enolate instead seeks to avoid 1,3-diaxial interactions:

For clarity, the stereocenter on the enolate has been epimerized; in reality, the opposite diastereoface of the aldehyde would have been attacked.

However, Fráter & Seebach showed that a chelating Lewis basic moiety adjacent to the enol will instead cause anti addition.

==== On the electrophile ====
E enolates exhibit Felkin diastereoface selection, while Z enolates exhibit anti-Felkin selectivity. The general model is presented below:

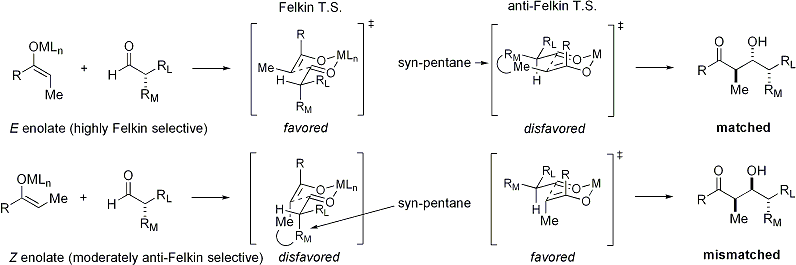
The general model of the aldol reaction with carbonyl-based stereocontrol

Since the transition state for Z enolates must contain either a destabilizing syn-pentane interaction or an anti-Felkin rotamer, Z-enolates are less diastereoselective:

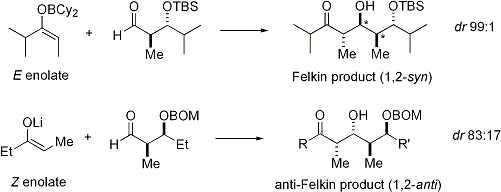
Examples of the aldol reaction with carbonyl-based stereocontrol

==== On both ====
If both the enolate and the aldehyde contain pre-existing chirality, then the outcome of the "double stereodifferentiating" aldol reaction may be predicted using a merged stereochemical model that takes into account all the effects discussed above. Several examples are as follows:

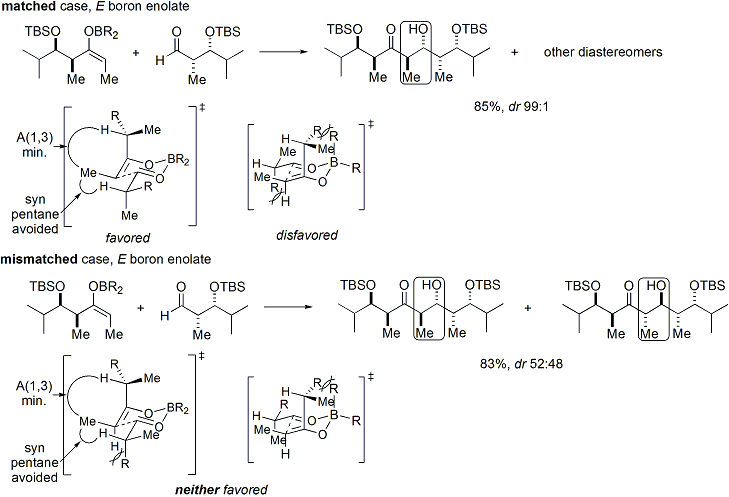

== Oxazolidinone chiral auxiliaries ==
In the late 1970s and 1980s, David A. Evans and coworkers developed a technique for stereoselection in the aldol syntheses of aldehydes and carboxylic acids. The method works by temporarily appending a chiral oxazolidinone auxiliary to create a chiral enolate. The pre-existing chirality from the auxiliary is then transferred to the aldol adduct through Zimmermann-Traxler methods, and then the oxazolidinone cleaved away.

Aldol reaction creates stereoisomers

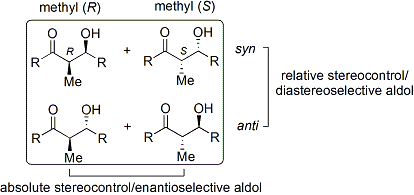
Four possible stereoisomers of the aldol reaction

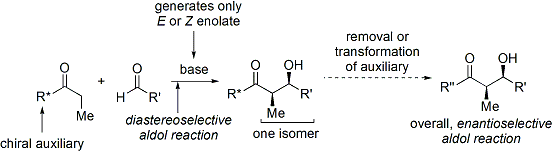

Commercial oxazolidinones are relatively expensive, but derive in 2 synthetic steps from comparatively inexpensive amino acids. (Economical large-scale syntheses prepare the auxiliary in-house.) First, a borohydride reduces the acid moiety. Then the resulting amino alcohol dehydratively cyclises with a simple carbonate ester, such as diethylcarbonate.

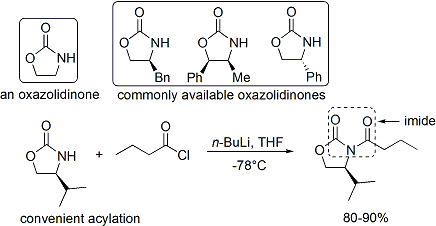

The acylation of an oxazolidinone is informally referred to as "loading done".

Anti adducts, which require an E enolate, cannot be obtained reliably with the Evans method. However, Z enolates, leading to syn adducts, can be reliably formed using boron-mediated soft enolization:

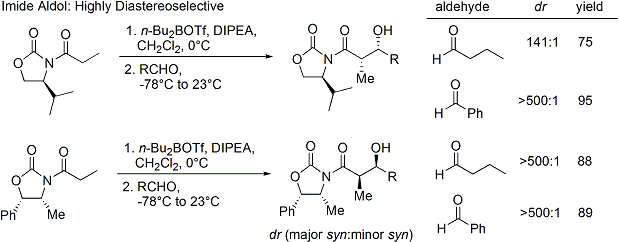

Often, a single diastereomer may be obtained by one crystallization of the aldol adduct.

Many methods cleave the auxiliary:

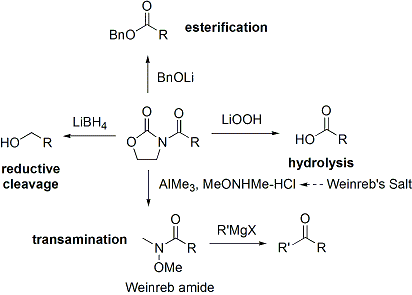
Evans' chiral oxazolidinone cleavage

== Variations ==
A common additional chiral auxiliary is a thioether group: (Note: In this reaction the nucleophile is a boron enolate derived from reaction with dibutylboron triflate (nBu_{2}BOTf), the base is N,N-diisopropylethylamine. The thioether is removed in step 2 by Raney Nickel / hydrogen reduction)

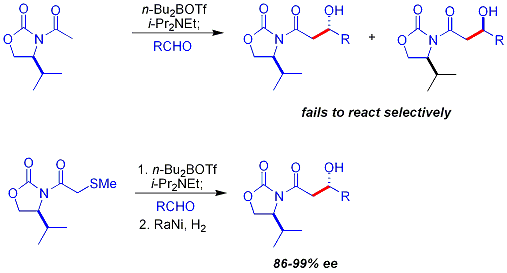

=== Crimmins thiazolidinethione aldol ===
In the Crimmins thiazolidinethione approach, a thiazolidinethione is the chiral auxiliary and can produce the "Evans syn" or "non-Evans syn" adducts by simply varying the amount of (−)-sparteine. The reaction is believed to proceed via six-membered, titanium-bound transition states, analogous to the proposed transition states for the Evans auxiliary.

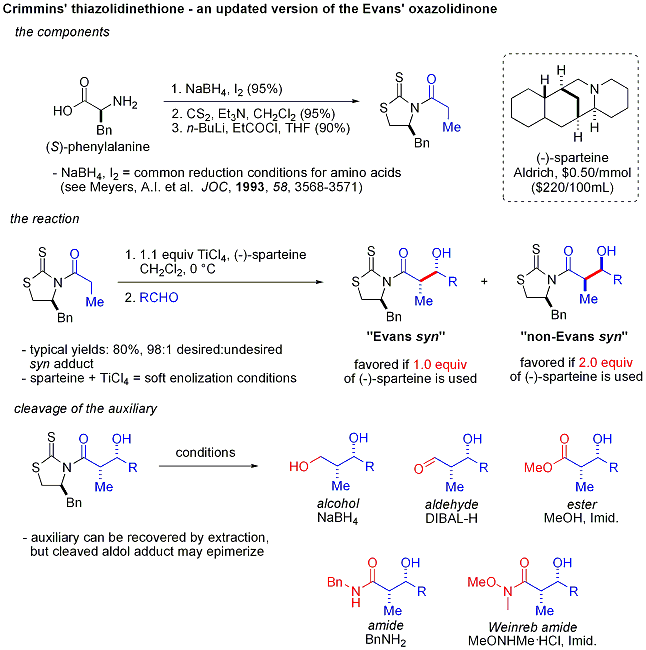
NOTE: the structure of sparteine is missing an N atom

=== "Masked" enols ===
A common modification of the aldol reaction uses other, similar functional groups as ersatz enols. In the Mukaiyama aldol reaction, silyl enol ethers add to carbonyls in the presence of a Lewis acid catalyst, such as boron trifluoride (as boron trifluoride etherate) or titanium tetrachloride.

In the Stork enamine alkylation, secondary amines form enamines when exposed to ketones. These enamines then react (possibly enantioselectively) with suitable electrophiles. This strategy offers simple enantioselection without transition metals. In contrast to the preference for syn adducts typically observed in enolate-based aldol additions, these aldol additions are anti-selective.

In aqueous solution, the enamine can then be hydrolyzed from the product, making it a small organic molecule catalyst. In a seminal example, proline efficiently catalyzed the cyclization of a triketone:

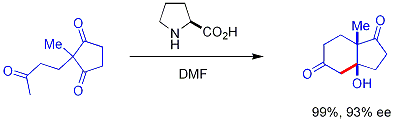

This combination is the Hajos-Parrish reaction Under Hajos-Parrish conditions only a catalytic amount of proline is necessary (3 mol%). There is no danger of an achiral background reaction because the transient enamine intermediates are much more nucleophilic than their parent ketone enols.

A Stork-type strategy also allows the otherwise challenging cross-reactions between two aldehydes. In many cases, the conditions are mild enough to avoid polymerization:

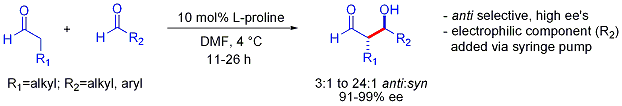

However, selectivity requires the slow syringe-pump controlled addition of the desired electrophilic partner because both reacting partners typically have enolizable protons. If one aldehyde has no enolizable protons or alpha- or beta-branching, additional control can be achieved.

=== "Direct" aldol additions ===
In the usual aldol addition, a carbonyl compound is deprotonated to form the enolate. The enolate is added to an aldehyde or ketone, which forms an alkoxide, which is then protonated on workup. A superior method, in principle, would avoid the requirement for a multistep sequence in favor of a "direct" reaction that could be done in a single process step.

If one coupling partner preferentially enolizes, then the general problem is that the addition generates an alkoxide, which is much more basic than the starting materials. This product binds tightly to the enolizing agent, preventing it from catalyzing additional reactants:

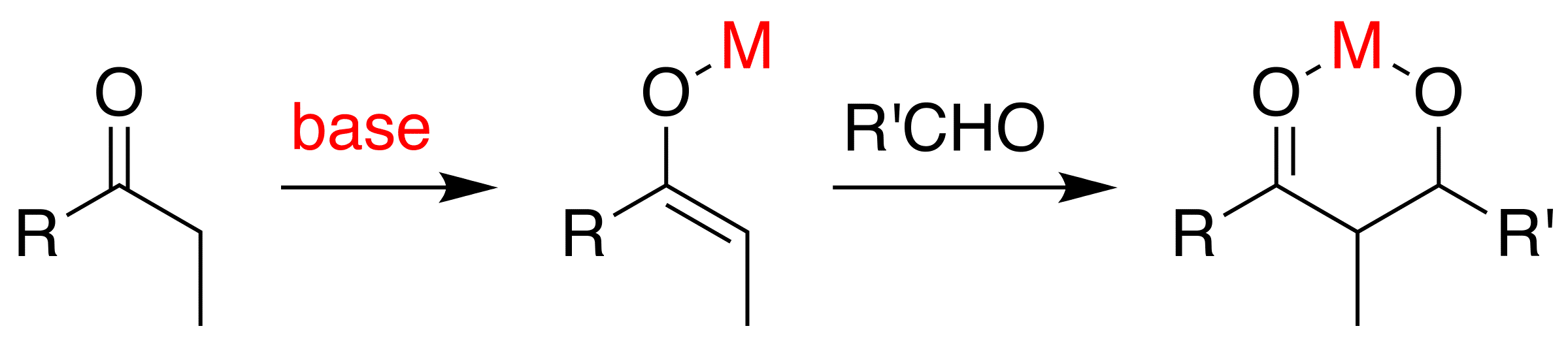

One approach, demonstrated by Evans, is to silylate the aldol adduct. A silicon reagent such as TMSCl is added in the reaction, which replaces the metal on the alkoxide, allowing turnover of the metal catalyst:

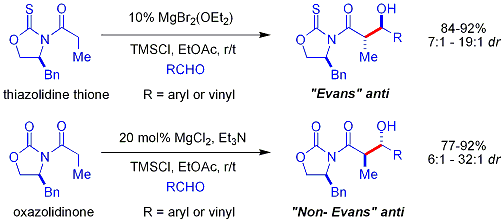

== Use in carbohydrate synthesis ==
Traditional syntheses of hexoses use variations of iterative protection-deprotection strategies, requiring 8–14 steps. Organocatalysis can access many of the same substrates by a two-step protocol involving the proline-catalyzed dimerization of alpha-oxyaldehydes followed by tandem Mukaiyama aldol cyclization.

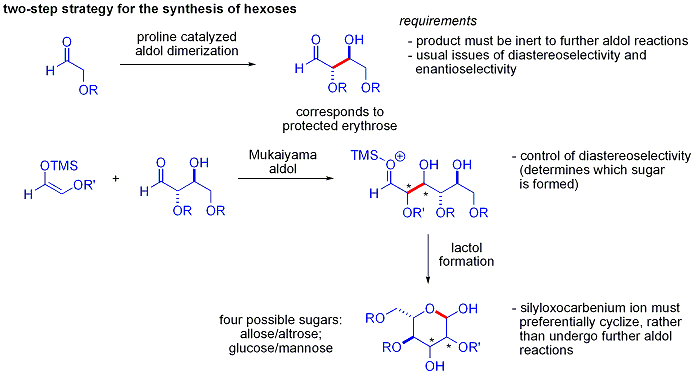

The aldol dimerization of alpha-oxyaldehydes requires that the aldol adduct, itself an aldehyde, be inert to further aldol reactions. Earlier studies revealed that aldehydes bearing alpha-alkyloxy or alpha-silyloxy substituents were suitable for this reaction, while aldehydes bearing Electron-withdrawing groups such as acetoxy were unreactive. The protected erythrose product could then be converted to four possible sugars via Mukaiyama aldol addition followed by lactol formation. This requires appropriate diastereocontrol in the Mukaiyama aldol addition and the product silyloxycarbenium ion to preferentially cyclize, rather than undergo further aldol reaction. In the end, glucose, mannose, and allose were synthesized:

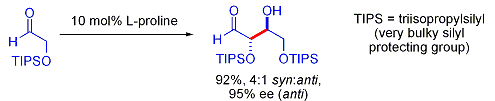

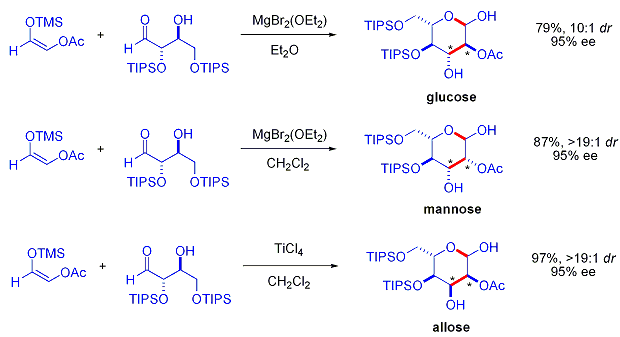

== Biological aldol reactions ==
Examples of aldol reactions in biochemistry include the splitting of fructose-1,6-bisphosphate into dihydroxyacetone and glyceraldehyde-3-phosphate in the fourth stage of glycolysis, which is an example of a reverse ("retro") aldol reaction catalyzed by the enzyme aldolase A (also known as fructose-1,6-bisphosphate aldolase).

In the glyoxylate cycle of plants and some prokaryotes, isocitrate lyase produces glyoxylate and succinate from isocitrate. Following deprotonation of the OH group, isocitrate lyase cleaves isocitrate into the four-carbon succinate and the two-carbon glyoxylate by an aldol cleavage reaction. This cleavage is similar mechanistically to the aldolase A reaction of glycolysis.

== History ==
The first aldol-type reaction was discovered in 1838 by Robert Kane from the reaction of mesityl alcohol in sulfuric acid to produce mesitylene. It was later discovered independently by the Russian chemist (and Romantic composer) Alexander Borodin in 1869 and by the French chemist Charles-Adolphe Wurtz in 1872, which originally used aldehydes to perform the reaction.

Howard Zimmerman and Marjorie D. Traxler proposed their model for stereoinduction in a 1957 paper.

== See also ==
- Aldol–Tishchenko reaction
- Baylis–Hillman reaction
- Ivanov reaction
- Reformatsky reaction
- Claisen–Schmidt condensation

== Notes ==
=== Further reading ===
- Chem 206, 215 Lecture Notes (2003, 2006) by D. A. Evans, A. G. Myers, et al., Harvard University (pp. 345, 936)
