= Lithium bis(trimethylsilyl)amide =

Chemical compound

- Monomer (does not exist)

- Cyclic trimer

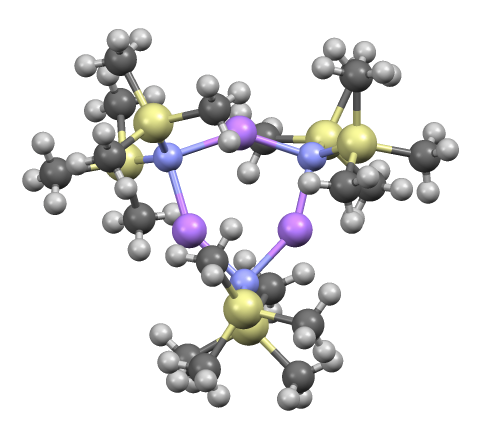

Names
- Preferred IUPAC name Lithium 1,1,1-trimethyl-N-(trimethylsilyl)silanaminide
- Other names Lithium hexamethyldisilazide Hexamethyldisilazane lithium salt

Identifiers
CAS Number	4039-32-1
3D model (JSmol)	ionic monomer: Interactive image; cyclic trimer: Interactive image
ChemSpider	21170111
ECHA InfoCard	100.021.569
PubChem CID	2733832
UNII	RC4N1I108M
CompTox Dashboard (EPA)	DTXSID2044426
- InChI: InChI=1S/C6H18NSi2.Li/c1-8(2,3)7-9(4,5)6;/h1-6H3;/q-1;+1
- SMILES: ionic monomer: C[Si](C)(C)[N-][Si](C)(C)C.[Li+]; cyclic trimer: C[Si](C)(C)[N+]0([Si](C)(C)C)[Li-][N+]([Si](C)(C)C)([Si](C)(C)C)[Li-][N+]([Si](C)(C)C)([Si](C)(C)C)[Li-]0

Properties
Chemical formula	LiN(Si(CH_{3})_{3})_{2}
Molar mass	167.33 g·mol^{−1}
Appearance	White solid
Density	0.86 g/cm^{3} at 25 °C
Melting point	71 to 72 °C (160 to 162 °F; 344 to 345 K)
Boiling point	80 to 84 °C (176 to 183 °F; 353 to 357 K) (0.001 mm Hg)
Solubility in water	decomposes
Solubility	Most aprotic solvents THF, hexane, toluene
Acidity (pK_{a})	26

Hazards
- Occupational safety and health (OHS/OSH)
Main hazards	flammable, corrosive

Related compounds
Related compounds	Sodium bis(trimethylsilyl)amide Potassium bis(trimethylsilyl)amide
- Except where otherwise noted, data are given for materials in their standard state (at 25 °C [77 °F], 100 kPa). verify (what is ?) Infobox references

Lithium bis(trimethylsilyl)amide is a lithiated organosilicon compound with the formula LiN(Si(CH_{3})_{3})_{2}. It is commonly abbreviated as LiHMDS or Li(HMDS) (lithium hexamethyldisilazide - a reference to its conjugate acid HMDS) and is primarily used as a strong non-nucleophilic base and as a ligand. Like many lithium reagents, it has a tendency to aggregate and will form a cyclic trimer in the absence of coordinating species.

== Preparation ==
LiHMDS is commercially available, but it can also be prepared by the deprotonation of bis(trimethylsilyl)amine with n-butyllithium. This reaction can be performed in situ.

HN(Si(CH_{3})_{3})_{2} + C_{4}H_{9}Li → LiN(Si(CH_{3})_{3})_{2} + C_{4}H_{10}

Once formed, the compound can be purified by sublimation or distillation.

== Reactions and applications ==
=== As a base ===
LiHMDS is often used in organic chemistry as a strong non-nucleophilic base. Its conjugate acid has a pK_{a} of ~26, making it is less basic than other lithium bases, such as LDA (pK_{a} of conjugate acid ~36). It is relatively more sterically hindered and hence less nucleophilic than other lithium bases. It can be used to form various organolithium compounds, including acetylides or lithium enolates.

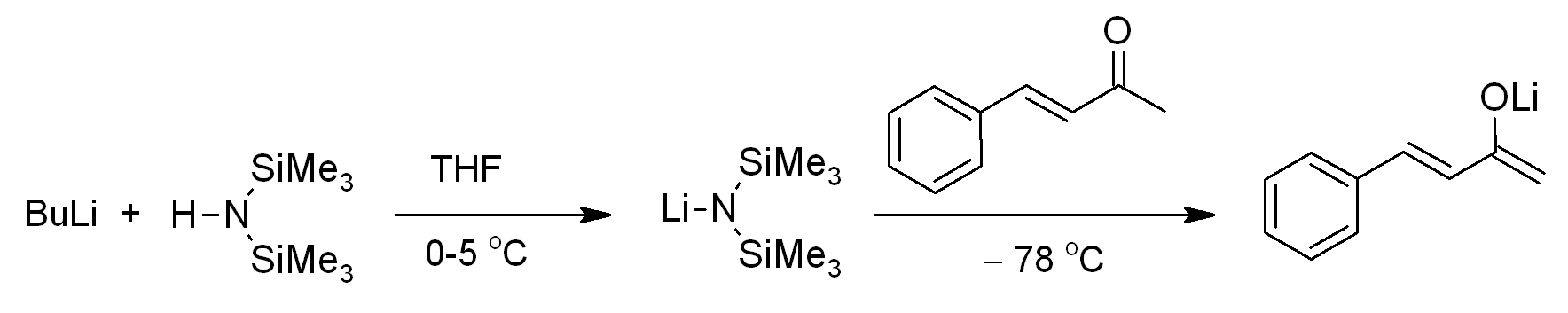

where Me = CH_{3}. As such, it finds use in a range of coupling reactions, particularly carbon-carbon bond forming reactions such as the Fráter–Seebach alkylation and mixed Claisen condensations.

An alternative synthesis of tetrasulfur tetranitride entails the use of S(N(Si(CH_{3})_{3})_{2})_{2} as a precursor with pre-formed S–N bonds. S(N(Si(CH_{3})_{3})_{2})_{2} is prepared by the reaction of lithium bis(trimethylsilyl)amide and sulfur dichloride (SCl_{2}).

2 LiN(Si(CH_{3})_{3})_{2} + SCl_{2} → S(N(Si(CH_{3})_{3})_{2})_{2} + 2 LiCl

The S(N(Si(CH_{3})_{3})_{2})_{2} reacts with the combination of SCl_{2} and sulfuryl chloride (SO_{2}Cl_{2}) to form S_{4}N_{4}, trimethylsilyl chloride, and sulfur dioxide:

2 S(N(Si(CH_{3})_{3})_{2})_{2} + 2 SCl_{2} + 2 SO_{2}Cl_{2} → S_{4}N_{4} + 8 (CH_{3})_{3}SiCl + 2 SO_{2}

=== As a ligand ===
Li(HMDS) can react with a wide range of metal halides, by a salt metathesis reaction, to give metal bis(trimethylsilyl)amides.

MX_{n} + n Li(HMDS) → M(HMDS)_{n} + n LiX

where X = Cl, Br, I and sometimes F

Metal bis(trimethylsilyl)amide complexes are lipophilic due to the ligand and hence are soluble in a range of nonpolar organic solvents, this often makes them more reactive than the corresponding metal halides, which can be difficult to solubilise. The steric bulk of the ligands causes their complexes to be discrete and monomeric; further increasing their reactivity. Having a built-in base, these compounds conveniently react with protic ligand precursors to give other metal complexes and hence are important precursors to more complex coordination compounds.

=== Niche uses ===
LiHMDS is volatile and has been discussed for use for atomic layer deposition of lithium compounds.

== Structure ==
Like many organolithium reagents, lithium bis(trimethylsilyl)amide can form aggregates in solution. The extent of aggregation depends on the solvent. In coordinating solvents, such as ethers and amines, the monomer and dimer are prevalent. In the monomeric and dimeric state, one or two solvent molecules bind to lithium centers. With ammonia as donor base lithium bis(trimethylsilyl)amide forms a trisolvated monomer that is stabilized by intermolecular hydrogen bonds. In noncoordinating solvents, such as aromatics or pentane, the complex oligomers predominate, including the trimer. In the solid state structure is trimeric.

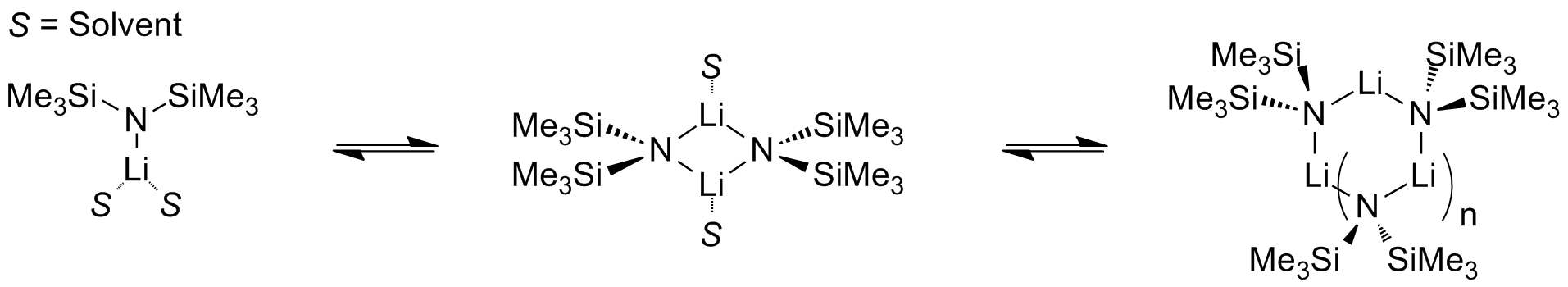

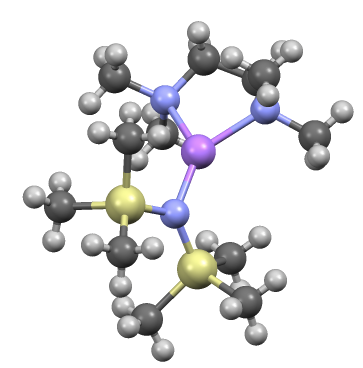
LiHMDS adduct with TMEDA

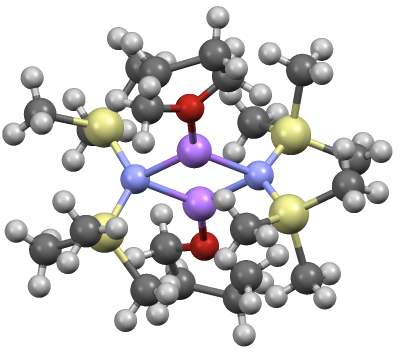
THF solvated dimer: [(LiHMDS)_{2}(THF)_{2}]

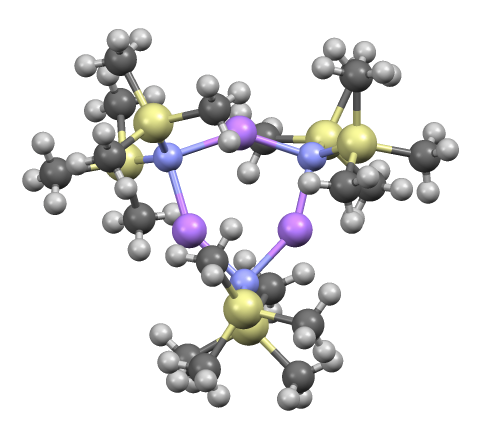
Trimer, solvent free: [(LiHMDS)_{3}]

== See also ==
- Lithium amide
- Lithium diisopropylamide
- Lithium tetramethylpiperidide
