= Nucleocidin =

Names
- IUPAC name 4′-Fluoroadenosine 5′-sulfamate
- Systematic IUPAC name [(2S,3S,4R,5R)-5-(6-Amino-9H-purin-9-yl)-2-fluoro-3,4-dihydroxytetrahydrofuran-2-yl]methyl sulfamate

Identifiers
CAS Number	24751-69-7
3D model (JSmol)	Interactive image
ChEBI	CHEBI:166872
ChemSpider	65250
PubChem CID	72299
UNII	F5097NG7JT
- InChI: InChI=1S/C10H13FN6O6S/c11-10(1-22-24(13,20)21)6(19)5(18)9(23-10)17-3-16-4-7(12)14-2-15-8(4)17/h2-3,5-6,9,18-19H,1H2,(H2,12,14,15)(H2,13,20,21)/t5-,6+,9-,10-/m1/s1 Key: LTBCQBSAWAZBDF-MLTZYSBQSA-N
- SMILES: c1nc(c2c(n1)n(cn2)[C@H]3[C@@H]([C@@H]([C@](O3)(COS(=O)(=O)N)F)O)O)N

Properties
Chemical formula	C_{10}H_{13}FN_{6}O_{6}S
Molar mass	364.31 g·mol^{−1}
- Except where otherwise noted, data are given for materials in their standard state (at 25 °C [77 °F], 100 kPa). Infobox references

Nucleocidin is a fluorine-containing nucleoside produced by Streptomyces calvus.

== Chemical structure ==
Nucleocidin stems from the ribonucleoside adenosine - is unique because it possess two rare functional groups: a fluorine atom and a sulfamyl ester

During 1968 the attempts to identify nucleocidin were made and at that time it was assigned to a structure of a 9-adenyl-4' -sulfamoyloxypentofuranoside, which was mainly based on experiments from NMR and mass spectrometry, as well as testing in chemical reactions. It was ultimately proven to have a structure of a 4' -fluoro-5' -O-sulphamoyladenosine.

== Microbiological origin ==
Nucleocidin is an antibiotic produced from Streptomyces calvus. Though toxic to mammals, it is able to function against bacteria both gram negative gram positive. It may be used against trypanosomes.

Though commonly known to be produced by Streptomyces calvus, nucleocidin is produced in greater yield by Streptomyces virens and Streptomyces aurorectus.

== Biochemical relevance ==
The compound is capable of interrupting the synthesis of peptides.

== See also ==
- 4-Fluoro-L-threonine
