= Modified aldol tandem reaction =

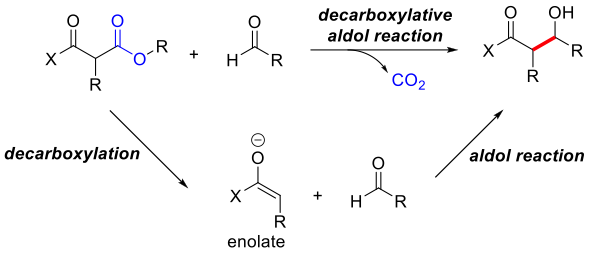
Modified aldol tandem reaction, decarboxylative aldol reaction as an example

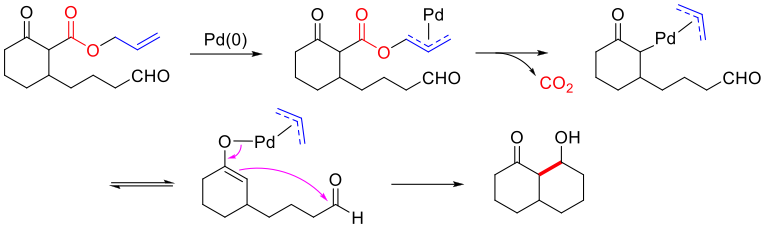
Palladium-mediated decarboxylative aldol reaction with allyl β-keto carboxylates

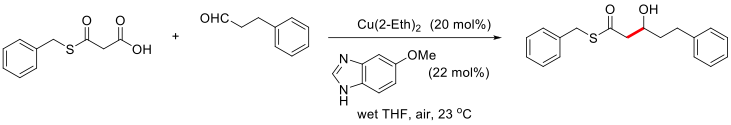
Decarboxylative aldol reaction with malonic acid half thioester

Modified aldol tandem reaction is a sequential chemical transformation that combines aldol reaction with other chemical reactions that generate enolates. Enolates are a common building block in chemical syntheses and are typically formed by the addition of base to a ketone or aldehyde. Modified Aldol tandem reactions allow similar reactivity to be produced without the need for a base which may have adverse effects in a given chemical synthesis. A representative example is the decarboxylative aldol reaction (Figure "Modified aldol tandem reaction, decarboxylative aldol reaction as an example"), where the enolate is generated via decarboxylation reaction mediated by either transition metals or organocatalysts. Key advantage of this reaction over other types of aldol reaction is the selective generation of an enolate in the presence of aldehydes. This allows for the directed aldol reaction to produce a desired cross aldol.

Transition metals have been used to mediate the modified aldol tandem reaction. Allyl β-keto carboxylates can be used as substrate for palladium-mediated decarboxylative aldol reaction (Figure "Palladium-mediated decarboxylative aldol reaction with allyl β-keto carboxylates"). The allyl group can be removed by palladium, following decarboxylation reaction selectively generates the enolate at the β-keto group, which could further react with aldehyde to generate aldols.

Using decarboxylation reaction to generate enolate is a common strategy in biosynthetic pathways such as polyketide synthesis, where malonic acid half thioester can be converted to the corresponding enolate for Claisen condensation reaction. Inspired by this, a modified tandem aldol reaction has been developed using the malonic acid half thioester as the enolate source. A copper based catalyst system has been developed for efficient aldol generation at mild conditions (Figure "Decarboxylative aldol reaction with malonic acid half thioester").
