= C19H25NO4 =

The molecular formula C_{19}H_{25}NO_{4} (molar mass: 331.41 g/mol, exact mass: 331.1784 u) may refer to:

- Annimycin
- 25O-NBOMe
- NBOMe-mescaline, or mescaline-NBOMe
- Tetramethrin
- 2,4,6-TMPEA-NBOMe
