= HDMS =

HDMS may refer to:

- His/Her Danish Majesty's Ship (in Danish, KDM), ship prefix for Denmark's Royal Danish Navy
- Hexamethyldisilazane, chemical reagent
