= Annimycin =

Polyenoic acid amide natural product produced by Streptomyces calvus

Names
- IUPAC name (3R,4Z,6E,8E,10E)-3-Hydroxy-N-(2-hydroxy-5-oxo-1-cyclopenten-1-yl)-8-methyl-4,6,8,10-tridecatetraenamide

Identifiers
3D model (JSmol)	Interactive image
ChemSpider	59702327
PubChem CID	139585542
CompTox Dashboard (EPA)	DTXSID901336338
- InChI: InChI=1S/C19H25NO4/c1-3-4-5-8-14(2)9-6-7-10-15(21)13-18(24)20-19-16(22)11-12-17(19)23/h4-10,15,21-22H,3,11-13H2,1-2H3,(H,20,24)/b5-4+,9-6+,10-7-,14-8+ Key: NWXCMIPYEHNXHW-VQOMMXTDSA-N
- SMILES: CC/C=C/C=C(\C)/C=C/C=C\C(CC(=O)NC1=C(CCC1=O)O)O

Properties
Chemical formula	C_{19}H_{25}NO_{4}
Molar mass	331.412 g·mol^{−1}
- Except where otherwise noted, data are given for materials in their standard state (at 25 °C [77 °F], 100 kPa). Infobox references

Annimycin (4-(Z)-annimycin) is a polyenoic acid amide natural product produced by Streptomyces calvus. Annimycin inhibits the sporulation of several actinobacterial genera.

== Biosynthesis ==
All of the genes necessary for the biosynthesis of annimycin are contained within a single 35 kb cluster. The biosynthetic structural genes, summarized in figure 2. consist of five open reading frames encoding the biosynthesis of the C_{5}N group (ann1, ann2 and ann3 genes) and the polyenoic acid (genes ann4 and ann5). The genes ann4 and ann5 encode two polypeptides that correspond to a type 1 polyketide synthase PKS.

The biosynthesis of the C_{5}N ring was recently reconstructed. The ann2 gene encodes a 5-aminolevulinate synthase which condenses glycine and succinyl-CoA in a Claisen-like reaction to form 5-aminolevulinate. The ann3 gene produces acyl-CoA ligase and is predicted to activate 5-aminolevulinate as the CoA thioester, which subsequently undergo intramolecular cyclization with a carbanion generated at C5 to form C_{5}N. The ann2 product is predicted to catalyze this cyclization using pyridoxal phosphate to stabilize the carbanion. The gene ann1 encodes an ATP-dependent amide synthetase and is predicted to condense the amine of the C_{5}N group with the polyenoic acid product forming annimycin.

Genes ann4 and ann5 are the polyketide synthase part of the biosynthesis. Gene ann4 is organized in four modules, including the loading module, loading a propionyl unit, the sequences of the AT (acyltransferase) domain modules 1-3 are predicted to load malonyl and methylmalonyl extender units. The ann5 gene product is organized in modules 4 and 5, the latter terminating with a thioesterase domain.

One of the most interesting things about this biosynthetic pathway is the presence of the Z stereochemistry in the C4/C5 double bond. This feature is not commonly seen in polyketides. Moreover, module 5 contains a dehydratase (DH) domain that is not functional.

Biosynthesis of annimycin proposed by Kalan et al., including the biosynthetic gene cluster and the encoded enzymes (Modification from original paper).
