= N-Butylsodium =

n-Butylsodium
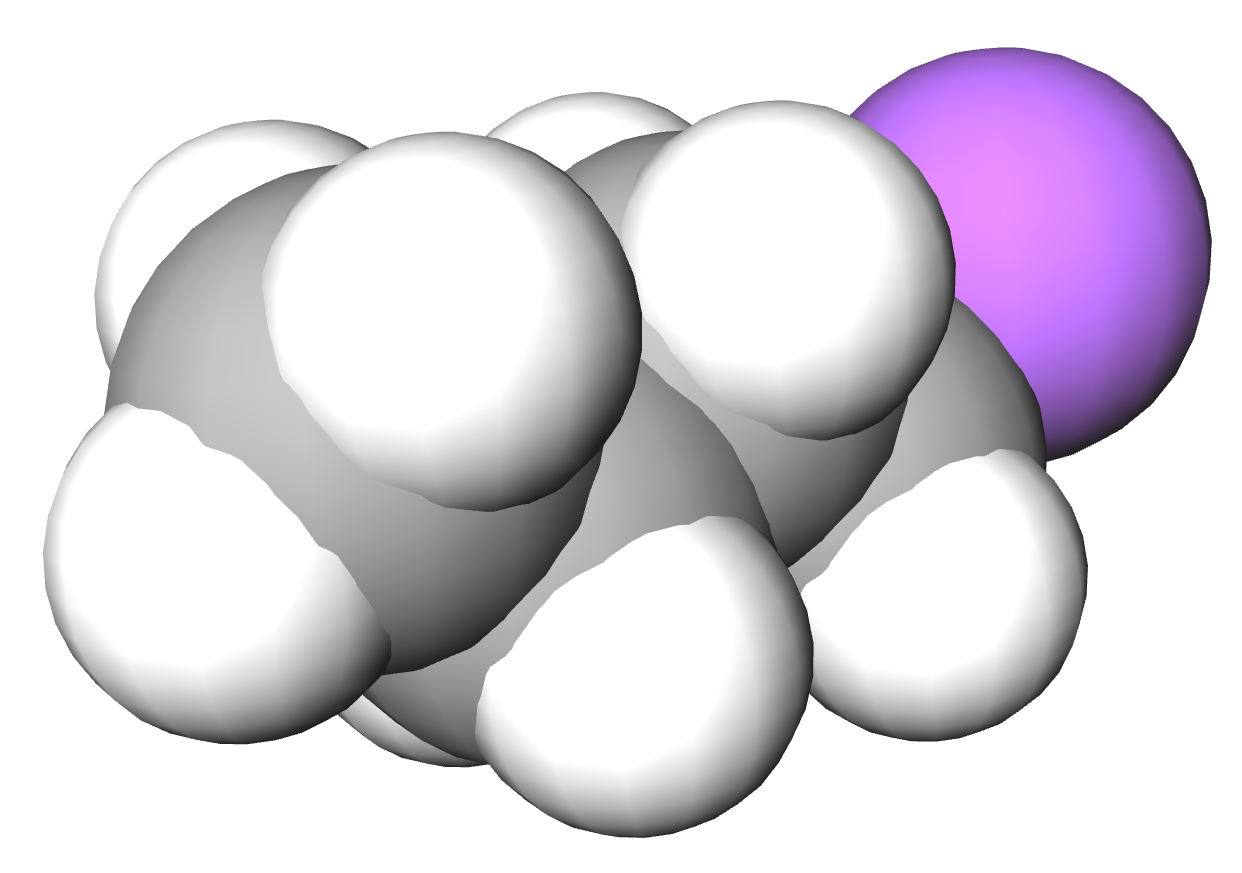

Names
- Preferred IUPAC name Butylsodium
- Other names 1-Sodiobutane

Identifiers
CAS Number	3525-44-8
3D model (JSmol)	Interactive image
ChemSpider	11351318
PubChem CID	101040259
- InChI: InChI=1S/C4H9.Na/c1-3-4-2;/h1,3-4H2,2H3; Key: IRDQNLLVRXMERV-UHFFFAOYSA-N
- SMILES: CCC[CH2].[Na]

Properties
Chemical formula	C_{4}H_{9}Na
Molar mass	80.106 g·mol^{−1}
Appearance	white solid

Hazards
- GHS labelling
Pictograms	(GHS02: Flammable) (GHS07: Exclamation mark)
Signal word	Danger

Related compounds
Related compounds	n-Butylpotassium n-Butyllithium
- Except where otherwise noted, data are given for materials in their standard state (at 25 °C [77 °F], 100 kPa). Infobox references

n-Butylsodium CH_{3}CH_{2}CH_{2}CH_{2}Na is an organometallic compound with the idealized formula NaC_{4}H_{9}. Like other simple organosodium compounds, it is polymeric and highly basic. In contrast to n-butyllithium, n-butylsodium is only of specialized academic interest.

== Preparation ==
n-Butylsodium is prepared from n-butyllithium and t-butoxysodium by metal exchange and precipitation.

== Properties ==
In n-Butylsodium, the Na-C bond has ionic character, with a negative charge on the end carbon atom. n-Butylsodium is insoluble in saturated hydrocarbons. It reacts with unsaturated hydrocarbons. Soluble adducts are produced with Lewis bases such as tetramethylethylenediamine or tetrahydrofuran.

== Reactions ==
n-Butylsodium reacts with alkylbenzene or allylbenzene compounds to give new organosodium compounds. With toluene the major product is benzylsodium.

n-Butylsodium reacts with 1-bromonaphthalene to make 1-sodiumnapthalene and 1-bromobutane, but there are few such metathesis reactions.

n-Butylsodium reacts with 2,2,6,6-Tetramethylpiperidine to form the sodium analogue of the sterically hindered base lithium tetramethylpiperidide.
