= Dibutylboron trifluoromethanesulfonate =

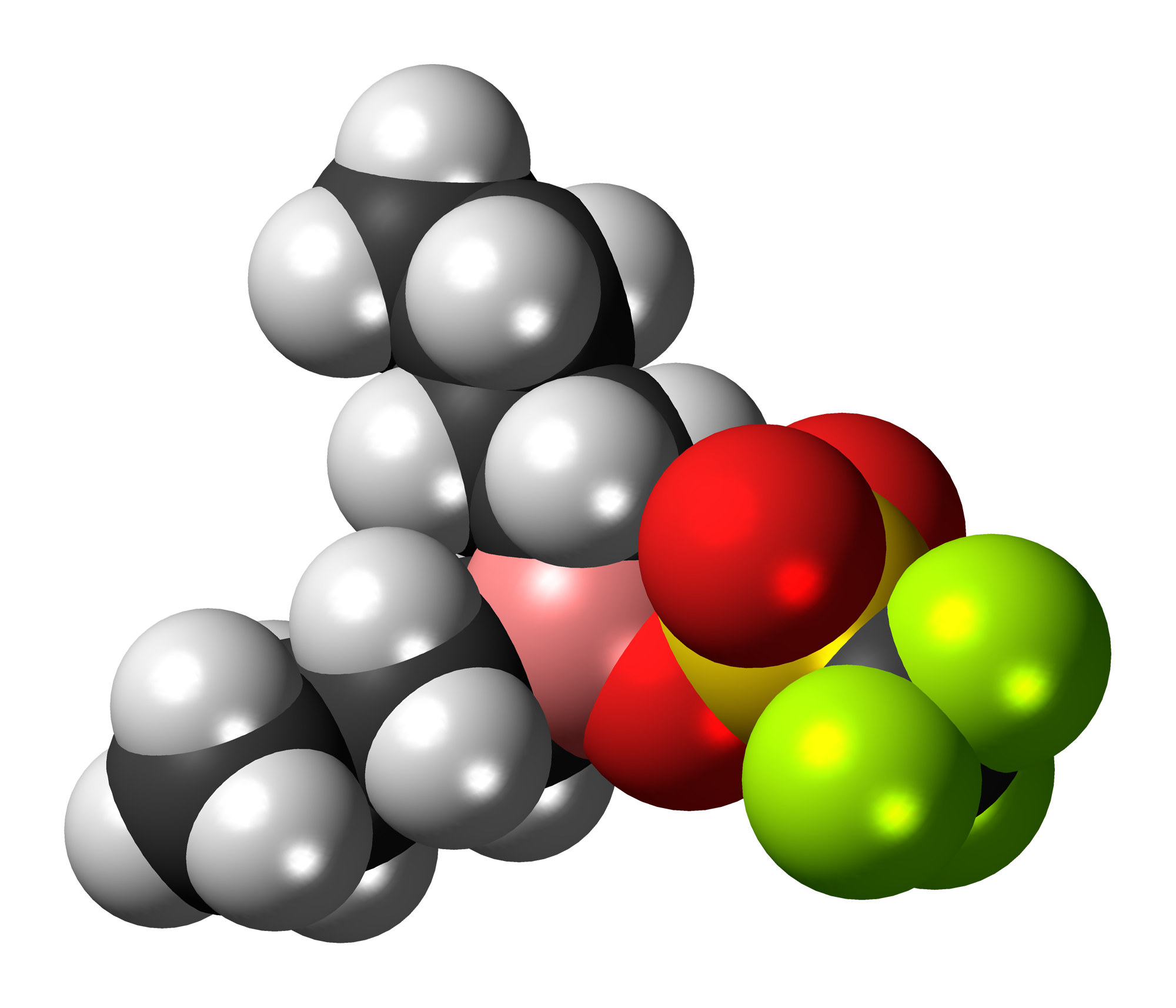

Names
- Preferred IUPAC name Dibutylborinic trifluoromethanesulfonic anhydride
- Other names Dibutylboron triflate

Identifiers
CAS Number	60669-69-4
3D model (JSmol)	Interactive image
Abbreviations	DBBT
ChemSpider	23621624
ECHA InfoCard	100.124.520
PubChem CID	2724243
CompTox Dashboard (EPA)	DTXSID20369121
- InChI: InChI=1S/C8H18B.CHF3O3S/c1-3-5-7-9-8-6-4-2;2-1(3,4)8(5,6)7/h3-8H2,1-2H3;(H,5,6,7)/q+1;/p-1
- SMILES: [B+](CCCC)CCCC.C(F)(F)(F)S(=O)(=O)[O-]

Properties
Chemical formula	C_{9}H_{18}BF_{3}O_{3}S
Molar mass	274.11 g·mol^{−1}

Hazards
- GHS labelling
Pictograms	(GHS05: Corrosive)
Signal word	Danger
Hazard statements	H314
Precautionary statements	P260, P264, P280, P301+P330+P331, P303+P361+P353, P304+P340, P305+P351+P338, P310, P321, P363, P405, P501
- Except where otherwise noted, data are given for materials in their standard state (at 25 °C [77 °F], 100 kPa). Infobox references

Dibutylboron trifluoromethanesulfonate (also called dibutylboron triflate or DBBT) is a reagent in organic chemistry. Its chemical formula is C_{9}H_{18}BF_{3}O_{3}S. It is used in asymmetric synthesis for example in the formation of boron enolates in the aldol reaction.
