= Fráter–Seebach alkylation =

In organic chemistry, the Fráter–Seebach alkylation (also known as Seebach–Fráter alkylation or Fráter–Seebach reaction) is a diastereoselective alkylation of chiral beta-hydroxy esters using strong bases. The reaction was first published by Georg Fráter in 1979; in 1980, Dieter Seebach reported about a similar reaction with malic acid ester.

== Outline and mechanism ==
Chiral beta-hydroxy esters can be treated with two equivalents of a strong base (lithium diisopropylamide (LDA) or lithium bis(trimethylsilyl)amide (LHMDS) are popular choices) to both remove the proton on the alcohol and enolize the ester.

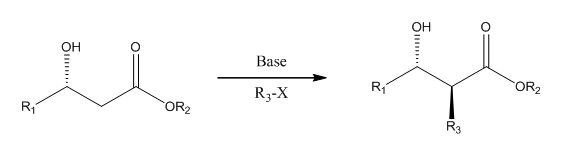

An alkylating agent (methyl iodide in the case of Fráter's publication) is then added. This attacks from the opposite face of the chiral hydroxyl group to avoid steric hindrance as shown below in the 6-membered transition state with chelating metal ions.

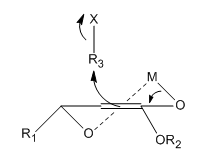

This reaction has since been used in the synthesis of many natural products due to its high yield and diastereoselectivity.
