= Streptomyces aureorectus =

Scientific classification
- Domain: Bacteria
- Kingdom: Bacillati
- Phylum: Actinomycetota
- Class: Actinomycetes
- Order: Streptomycetales
- Family: Streptomycetaceae
- Genus: Streptomyces
- Species: S. aureorectus

Binomial name
- Streptomyces aureorectus (ex Taig et al. 1969) Taig and Solovieva 1986

Type strain
- 2843-10, CGMCC 4.1944, DSM 41692, IFO 15896, INA A-2843-10, INA A-78, JCM 9947, NBIMCC 3603, NBRC 15896, NRRL B-24301, RIA 553, VKM Ac-1828

Synonyms
- Actinomyces aureorectus

Species of bacterium

Streptomyces aureorectus is a bacterium species from the genus of Streptomyces which has been isolated from soil in Russia. Streptomyces aureorectus produces aurenin.

== See also ==
- List of Streptomyces species
