= Non-nucleophilic base =

Sterically hindered organic base

As the name suggests, a non-nucleophilic base is a sterically hindered organic base that is a poor nucleophile. Normal bases are also nucleophiles, but often chemists seek the proton-removing ability of a base without any other functions. Typical non-nucleophilic bases are bulky, such that protons can attach to the basic center but alkylation and complexation is inhibited.

== Non-nucleophilic bases ==
A variety of amines and nitrogen heterocycles are useful bases of moderate strength (pK_{a} of conjugate acid around 10-13)

- N,N-Diisopropylethylamine (DIPEA, also called Hünig's Base), pK_{a} = 10.75
- 1,8-Diazabicycloundec-7-ene (DBU) - useful for E2 elimination reactions, pK_{a} = 13.5
- 1,5-Diazabicyclo(4.3.0)non-5-ene (DBN) - comparable to DBU
- 2,6-Di-tert-butylpyridine, a weak non-nucleophilic base pK_{a} = 3.58
- Phosphazene bases, such as t-Bu-P_{4}

Non-nucleophilic bases of high strength are usually anions. For these species, the pK_{a}s of the conjugate acids are around 35–40.

- Lithium diisopropylamide (LDA), pK_{a} = 36
- Silicon-based amides, such as sodium and potassium bis(trimethylsilyl)amide (NaHMDS and KHMDS, respectively)
- Lithium tetramethylpiperidide (LiTMP or harpoon base)

Other strong non-nucleophilic bases are sodium hydride and potassium hydride. These compounds are dense, salt-like materials that are insoluble and operate by surface reactions.

Some reagents are of high basicity (pK_{a} of conjugate acid around 17) but of modest but not negligible nucleophilicity. Examples include sodium tert-butoxide and potassium tert-butoxide.

== Example ==
The following diagram shows how the hindered base, lithium diisopropylamide, is used to deprotonate an ester to give the enolate in the Claisen ester condensation, instead of undergoing a nucleophilic substitution.

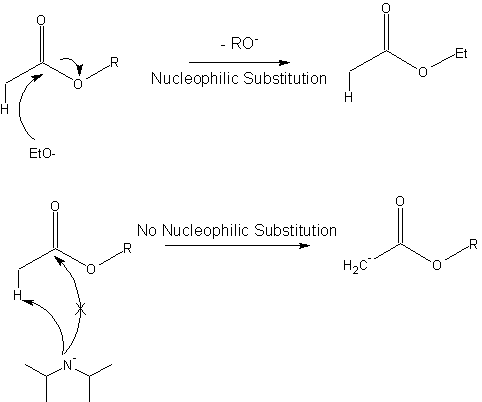

This reaction (deprotonation with LDA) is commonly used to generate enolates.
