= Potassium bis(trimethylsilyl)amide =

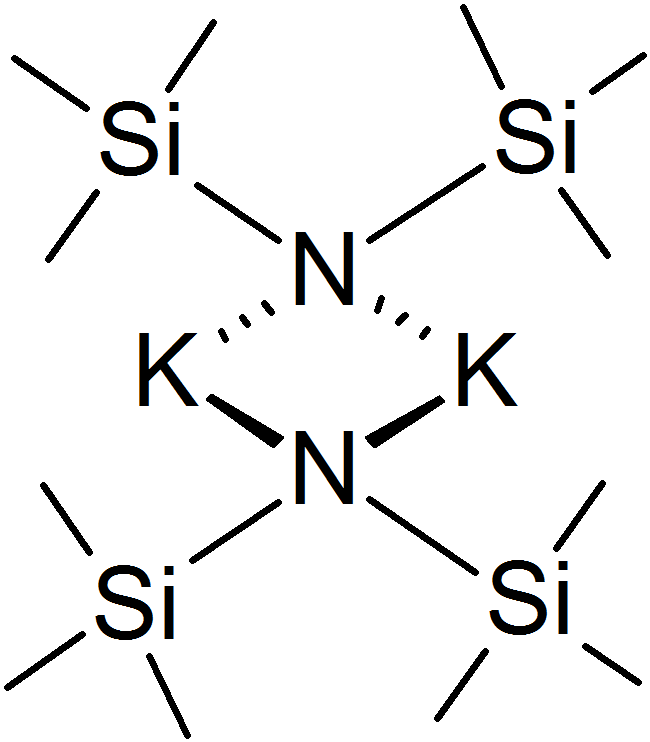
- Stereo, skeletal formula of potassium bis(trimethylsilyl)amide dimer

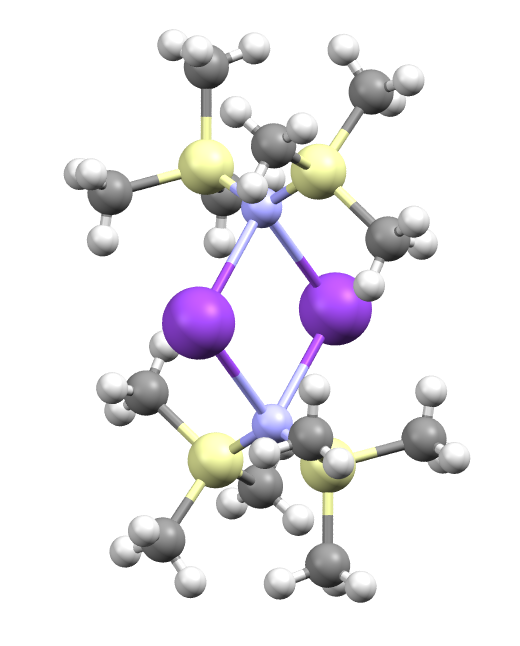
- Ball and stick model of potassium bis(trimethylsilyl)amide dimer

Names
- Preferred IUPAC name Potassium 1,1,1-trimethyl-N-(trimethylsilyl)silanaminide
- Other names Potassium hexamethyldisilazide Potassium hexamethylsilazane

Identifiers
CAS Number	40949-94-8
3D model (JSmol)	Interactive image
Abbreviations	KHMDS
ChemSpider	21171158
ECHA InfoCard	100.102.263
PubChem CID	3251421
UNII	2E7VDS6M6L
UN number	3263
CompTox Dashboard (EPA)	DTXSID00390655
- InChI: InChI=1S/C6H18NSi2.K/c1-8(2,3)7-9(4,5)6;/h1-6H3;/q-1;+1 Key: IUBQJLUDMLPAGT-UHFFFAOYSA-N
- SMILES: C[Si](C)(C)N([K])[Si](C)(C)C

Properties
Chemical formula	KSi_{2}C_{6}NH_{18}
Molar mass	199.4831 g mol^{−1}
Appearance	White, opaque crystals
Solubility in water	Reacts

Hazards
- GHS labelling
Pictograms	(GHS05: Corrosive)
Signal word	Danger
Hazard statements	H314
Precautionary statements	P280, P305+P351+P338, P310

Related compounds
Other cations	Lithium bis(trimethylsilyl)amide Sodium bis(trimethylsilyl)amide
- Except where otherwise noted, data are given for materials in their standard state (at 25 °C [77 °F], 100 kPa). verify (what is ?) Infobox references

Potassium bis(trimethylsilyl)amide (commonly abbreviated as KHMDS, Potassium(K) HexaMethylDiSilazide) or potassium hexamethyldisilazane is the chemical compound with the formula ((CH_{3})_{3}Si)_{2}NK. It is a strong, non-nucleophilic base with an approximate pK_{a} of 26 (compare to lithium diisopropylamide, at 36).

== Structure ==
The methylsilyl groups give KHMDS good solubility in most organic solvents. Solution structures are either solvated monomers or dimers (or mixtures thereof) with this depending on the coordinating power, concentration, and temperature of the solvent. In general, weakly coordinating solvents such as toluene and N,N-dimethylethylamine give dimers, where as THF and diglyme gave monomers at high dilution. In the solid state, the unsolvated compound is dimeric, with two potassium and two nitrogen atoms forming a square. KHMDS conducts electricity poorly in solution and in the melt, which is attributed to very strong ion pairing.

== See also ==
- Metal bis(trimethylsilyl)amides
