= Lithium tetramethylpiperidide =

- Structural formula of lithium tetramethylpiperidide

Names
- IUPAC name Lithium tetramethylpiperidide
- Systematic IUPAC name 1-Lithio-2,2,6,6-tetramethylpiperidine

Identifiers
CAS Number	38227-87-1
3D model (JSmol)	Interactive image; Interactive image; Cyclic tetramer: Interactive image
ChemSpider	21428984
ECHA InfoCard	100.209.926
PubChem CID	11051814
CompTox Dashboard (EPA)	DTXSID00453330
- InChI: InChI=1S/C9H18N.Li/c1-8(2)6-5-7-9(3,4)10-8;/h5-7H2,1-4H3;/q-1;+1 Key: ANYSGBYRTLOUPO-UHFFFAOYSA-N
- SMILES: [Li]N1C(C)(C)CCCC1(C)C; CC1(C)CCCC(C)(C)N1[Li]; Cyclic tetramer: CC1(C)CCCC(C)(C)[N+]01[Li-][N+]1(C(C)(C)CCCC1(C)C)[Li-][N+]1(C(C)(C)CCCC1(C)C)[Li-][N+]1([Li-]0)C(C)(C)CCCC1(C)C

Properties
Chemical formula	LiC_{9}H_{18}N
Molar mass	147.19 g·mol^{−1}
Acidity (pK_{a})	37
- Except where otherwise noted, data are given for materials in their standard state (at 25 °C [77 °F], 100 kPa). verify (what is ?) Infobox references

Lithium tetramethylpiperidide (often abbreviated LiTMP or LTMP) is a chemical compound with the molecular formula LiC_{9}H_{18}N. It is used as a non-nucleophilic base, being comparable to LiHMDS in terms of steric hindrance.

== Synthesis ==
It is synthesised by the deprotonation of 2,2,6,6-tetramethylpiperidine with n-butyllithium, this is typically performed at −78 °C, although there are reports of it being performed at 0 °C. The compound is stable in a THF/ethylbenzene solvent mixture and is commercially available as such.

== Structure ==
Like many lithium reagents it has a tendency to aggregate, forming a tetramer in the solid state.

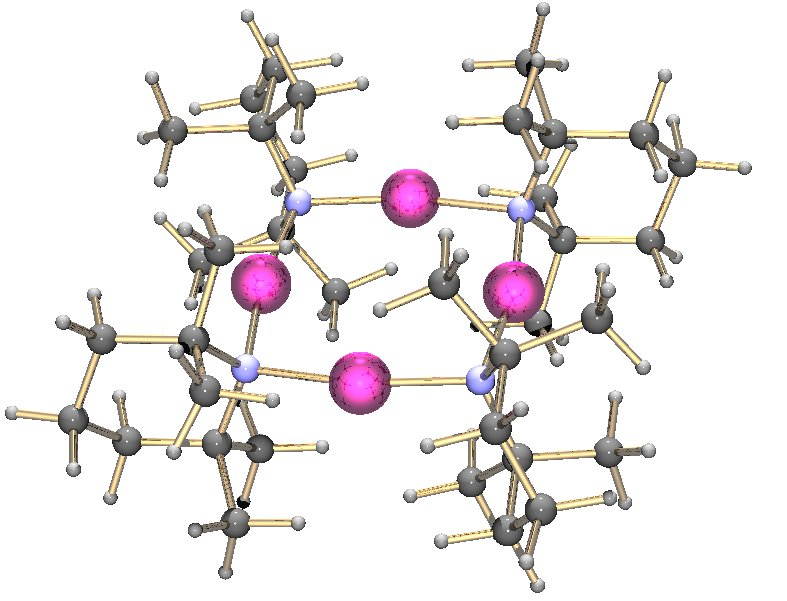

== See also ==
- Lithium diisopropylamide
- Lithium amide
