= Aurenin =

Names
- IUPAC name (15Z,17Z,19Z,21Z,23Z)-4,6,8,10,12,13,14,25-octahydroxy-3-(1-hydroxyhexyl)-15,26-dimethyl-1-oxacyclohexacosa-15,17,19,21,23-pentaen-2-one

Identifiers
| CAS Number | 34820-53-6 |
| 3D model (JSmol) | Interactive image |
| PubChem CID | 101593060 |
- InChI: InChI=1S/C33H54O11/c1-4-5-11-16-27(38)30-28(39)19-24(35)17-23(34)18-25(36)20-29(40)32(42)31(41)21(2)14-12-9-7-6-8-10-13-15-26(37)22(3)44-33(30)43/h6-10,12-15,22-32,34-42H,4-5,11,16-20H2,1-3H3/b7-6-,10-8-,12-9-,15-13-,21-14- Key: MHCJJKFRVNUEFV-AMSHOJPYSA-N
- SMILES: CCCCCC(C1C(CC(CC(CC(CC(C(C(/C(=C\C=C/C=C\C=C/C=C\C(C(OC1=O)C)O)/C)O)O)O)O)O)O)O)O

Properties
| Chemical formula | C_{33}H_{54}O_{11} |
| Molar mass | 626.784 g·mol^{−1} |
- Except where otherwise noted, data are given for materials in their standard state (at 25 °C [77 °F], 100 kPa). Infobox references

Aurenin is an antibiotic with the molecular formula C_{33}H_{54}O_{11}.
