= Streptomyces virens =

Scientific classification
- Domain: Bacteria
- Kingdom: Bacillati
- Phylum: Actinomycetota
- Class: Actinomycetes
- Order: Streptomycetales
- Family: Streptomycetaceae
- Genus: Streptomyces
- Species: S. virens

Binomial name
- Streptomyces virens Gause and Sveshnikova 1986

Type strain
- CGMCC 4.1927, DSM 41465, IFO 15901, INA 3831, JCM 9095, NBRC 15901, NRRL B-24331, VKM 833, VKM Ac-833

Species of bacterium

Streptomyces virens is a bacterium species from the genus of Streptomyces. Streptomyces virens produces virenomycin.

== See also ==
- List of Streptomyces species
