= Bis(trimethylsilyl)amine =

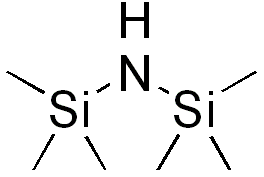
Structural formula of bis(trimethylsilyl)amine
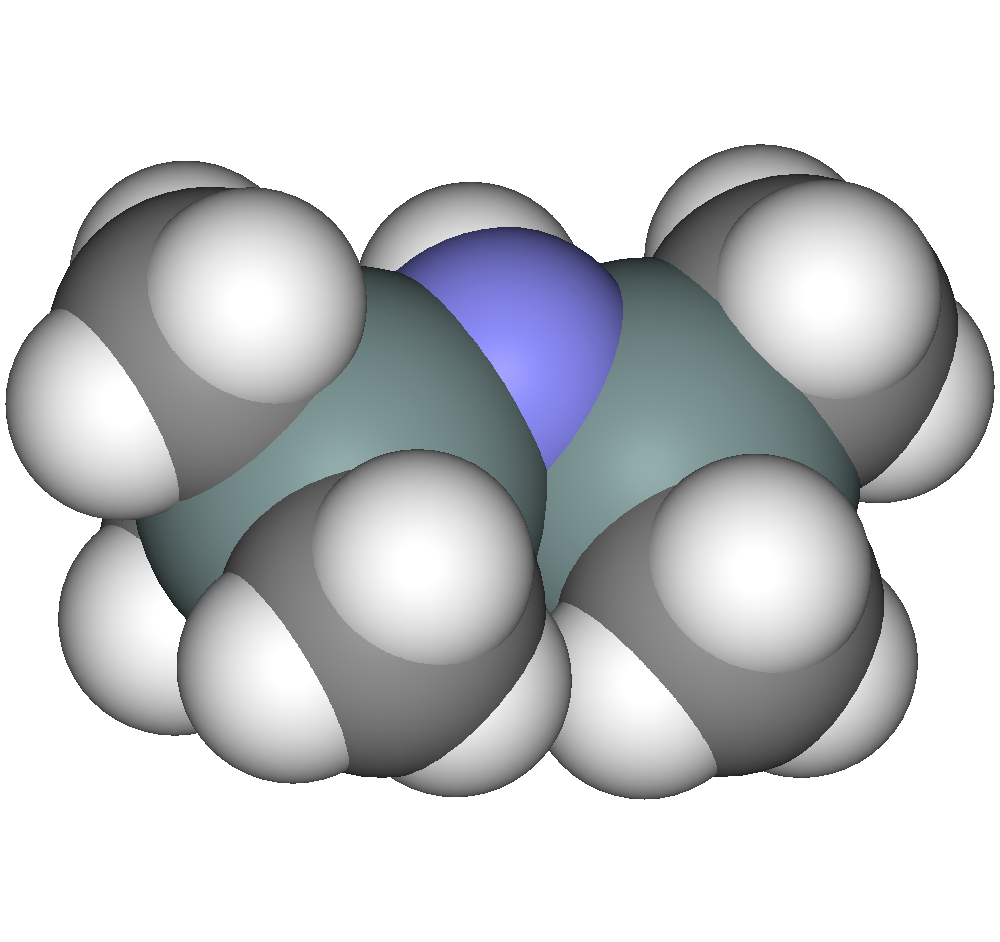
Spacefill model of bis(trimethylsilyl)amine

Names
- Preferred IUPAC name 1,1,1-Trimethyl-N-(trimethylsilyl)silanamine
- Other names Bis(trimethylsilyl)azane; Bis(trimethylsilyl)amine; 1,1,1,3,3,3-Hexamethyldisilazane; Hexamethyldisilazane

Identifiers
CAS Number	999-97-3
3D model (JSmol)	Interactive image; Interactive image
Abbreviations	HMDS
Beilstein Reference	635752
ChEBI	CHEBI:85068
ChemSpider	13238
ECHA InfoCard	100.012.425
EC Number	213-668-5
MeSH	Hexamethylsilazane
PubChem CID	13838; 18913873 amine; 45051731 sodium; 45051783 potassium
RTECS number	JM9230000
UNII	H36C68P1BH
UN number	2924, 3286
CompTox Dashboard (EPA)	DTXSID2025395
- InChI: InChI=1S/C6H19NSi2/c1-8(2,3)7-9(4,5)6/h7H,1-6H3 Key: FFUAGWLWBBFQJT-UHFFFAOYSA-N; InChI=1/C6H19NSi2/c1-8(2,3)7-9(4,5)6/h7H,1-6H3 Key: FFUAGWLWBBFQJT-UHFFFAOYAF
- SMILES: C[Si](C)(C)N[Si](C)(C)C; N([Si](C)(C)C)[Si](C)(C)C

Properties
Chemical formula	C_{6}H_{19}NSi_{2}
Molar mass	161.395 g·mol^{−1}
Appearance	Colorless liquid
Density	0.77 g cm^{−3}
Melting point	−78 °C (−108 °F; 195 K)
Boiling point	126 °C (259 °F; 399 K)
Solubility in water	Slow hydrolysis
Refractive index (n_{D})	1.4090

Hazards
NFPA 704 (fire diamond)	3 3 1
Safety data sheet (SDS)	External MSDS
- Except where otherwise noted, data are given for materials in their standard state (at 25 °C [77 °F], 100 kPa). verify (what is ?) Infobox references

Bis(trimethylsilyl)amine (also known as hexamethyldisilazane and HMDS) is an organosilicon compound with the molecular formula [(CH_{3})_{3}Si]_{2}NH. The molecule is a derivative of ammonia with trimethylsilyl groups in place of two hydrogen atoms. An electron diffraction study shows that silicon-nitrogen bond length (173.5 pm) and Si-N-Si bond angle (125.5°) to be similar to disilazane (in which methyl groups are replaced by hydrogen atoms) suggesting that steric factors are not a factor in regulating angles in this case. This colorless liquid is a reagent and a precursor to bases that are popular in organic synthesis and organometallic chemistry. Additionally, HMDS is also increasingly used as molecular precursor in chemical vapor deposition techniques to deposit silicon carbonitride thin films or coatings.

== Synthesis and derivatives ==
Bis(trimethylsilyl)amine is synthesized by treatment of trimethylsilyl chloride with ammonia:

2 (CH_{3})_{3}SiCl + 3 NH_{3} → [(CH_{3})_{3}Si]_{2}NH + 2 NH_{4}Cl

Ammonium nitrate together with triethylamine can be used instead. This method is also useful for ^{15}N isotopic enrichment of HMDS.

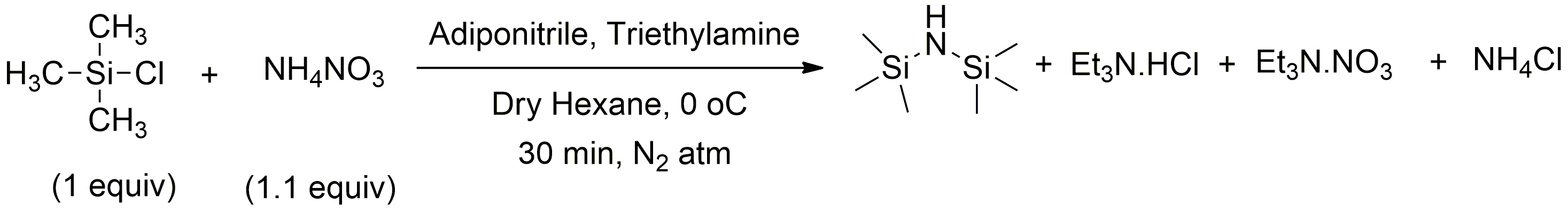

Alkali metal bis(trimethylsilyl)amides result from the deprotonation of bis(trimethylsilyl)amine. For example, lithium bis(trimethylsilyl)amide (LiHMDS) is prepared using n-butyllithium:

[(CH_{3})_{3}Si]_{2}NH + BuLi → [(CH_{3})_{3}Si]_{2}NLi + BuH

LiHMDS and other similar derivatives: sodium bis(trimethylsilyl)amide (NaHMDS) and potassium bis(trimethylsilyl)amide (KHMDS) are used as a non-nucleophilic bases in synthetic organic chemistry.

== Use as reagent ==
Hexamethyldisilazane is employed as a reagent in many organic reactions:

1) HMDS is used as a reagent in condensation reactions of heterocyclic compounds such as in the microwave synthesis of a derivative of xanthine:

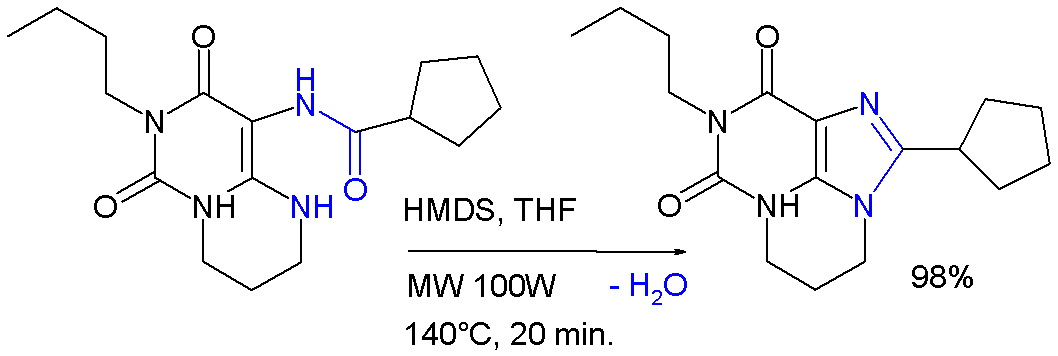

2) The HMDS mediated trimethylsilylation of alcohols, thiols, amines and amino acids as protective groups or for intermediary organosilicon compounds is found to be very efficient and replaced TMSCl reagent.

Silylation of glutamic acid with excess hexamethyldisilazane and catalytic TMSCl in either refluxing xylene or acetonitrile followed by dilution with alcohol (methanol or ethanol) yields the derived lactam pyroglutamic acid in good yield.

HMDS in the presence of catalytic iodine facilitates the silylation of alcohols in excellent yields.

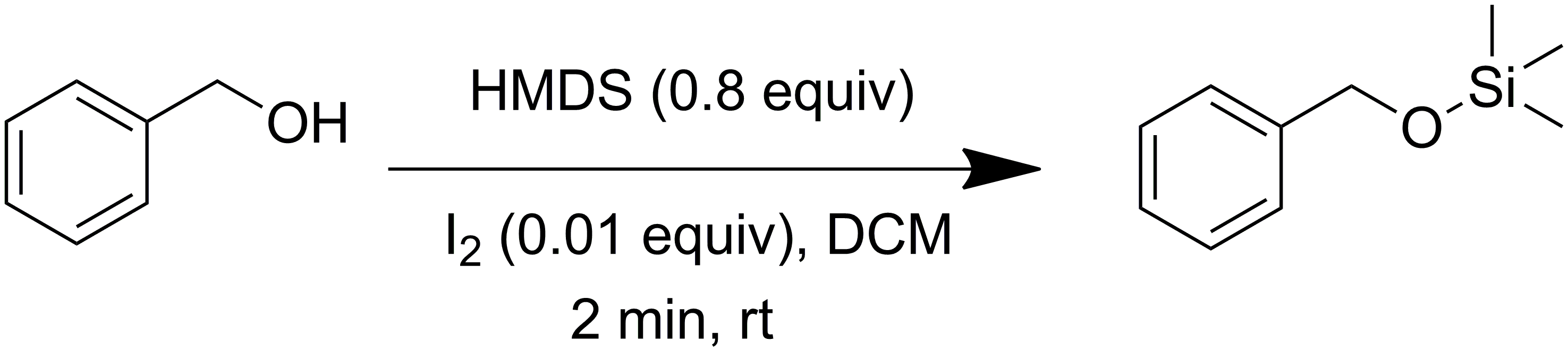

3) HMDS can be used to silylate laboratory glassware and make it hydrophobic, or automobile glass, just as Rain-X does.

4) In gas chromatography, HMDS can be used to silylate OH groups of organic compounds to increase volatility, this way enabling GC-analysis of chemicals that are otherwise non-volatile.

== Other uses ==
In photolithography, HMDS is often used as an adhesion promoter for photoresists. Best results are obtained by applying HMDS from the gas phase on heated substrates.

In electron microscopy, HMDS can be used as an alternative to critical point drying during sample preparation because of its very low surface tension.

In pyrolysis-gas chromatography-mass spectrometry, HMDS is added to the analyte to create silylated diagnostic products during pyrolysis, in order to enhance detectability of compounds with polar functional groups.

In plasma-enhanced chemical vapor deposition (PECVD), HMDS is used as a molecular precursor as a replacement to highly flammable and corrosive gasses like SiH_{4}, CH_{4}, NH_{3} as it can be easily handled. HMDS is used in conjunction with a plasma of various gases such as argon, helium, and nitrogen to deposit SiCN thin films/coatings with excellent mechanical, optical and electronic properties.

== See also ==
- Hexamethyldisiloxane
- Metal bis(trimethylsilyl)amides
