= Streptomyces calvus =

Scientific classification
- Domain: Bacteria
- Kingdom: Bacillati
- Phylum: Actinomycetota
- Class: Actinomycetes
- Order: Streptomycetales
- Family: Streptomycetaceae
- Genus: Streptomyces
- Species: S. calvus

Binomial name
- Streptomyces calvus Backus et al. 1957

Type strain
- AS 4.1691, ATCC 13382, ATCC 23890, BCRC 11859, Boots 1366, CBS 350.62, CBS 350.68, CBS 352.62, CBS 676.68, CCRC 11859, CECT 3271, CEST 3271, CGMCC 4.1691, DSMT, DSM 40010, DSMZ 40010, ETH 28551, ICMP 5336, IFM 1093, IFO 13200, ISP 5010, JCM 4326, JCM 4628, KCTC 9885, Lederle T-3018, NBRC 13200, NCIMB 12240, NIHJ 400, NRRL B-2399, NRRL-ISP 5010, NZRCC 10327, PSA 152, RIA 1103, T-3018, Tresner T-3018, VKM Ac-1185, VKMAc-1185

Species of bacterium

Streptomyces calvus is a bacterium species from the genus of Streptomyces which has been isolated from soil in Dinepur in India. Streptomyces calvus produces nucleocidin, adiposin 1 and adiposin 2.

== See also ==
- List of Streptomyces species
