= Sodium bis(trimethylsilyl)amide =

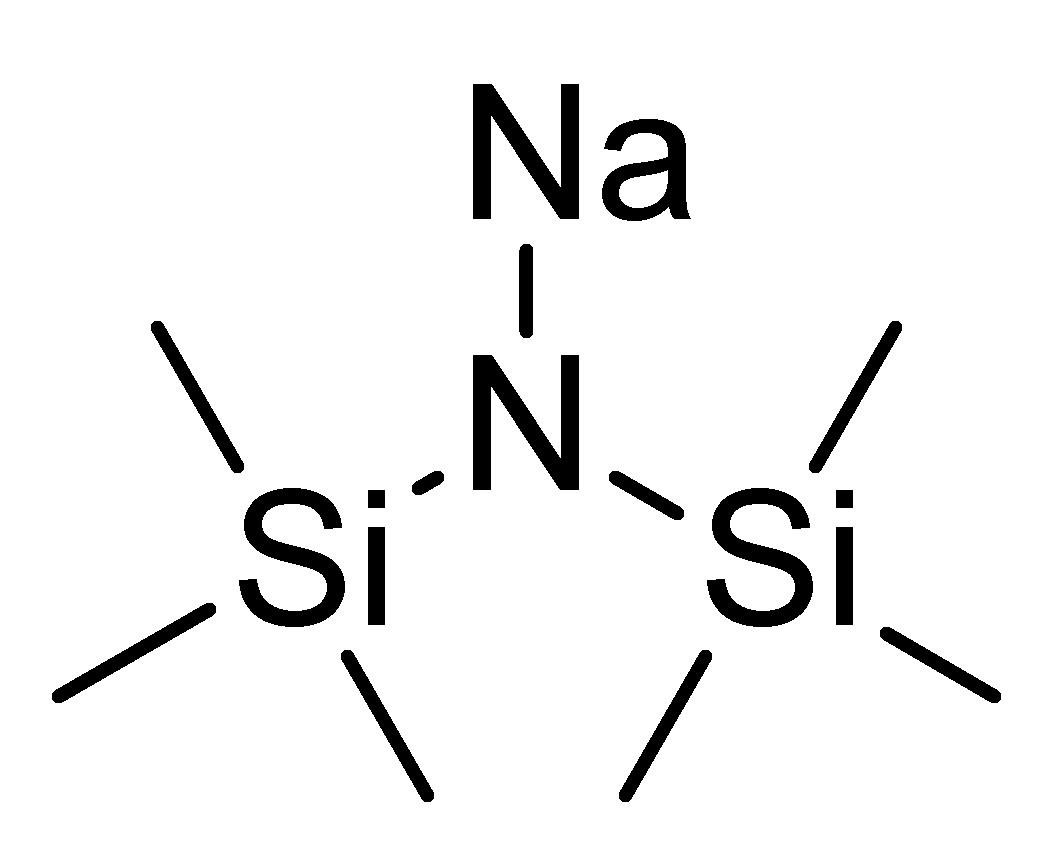

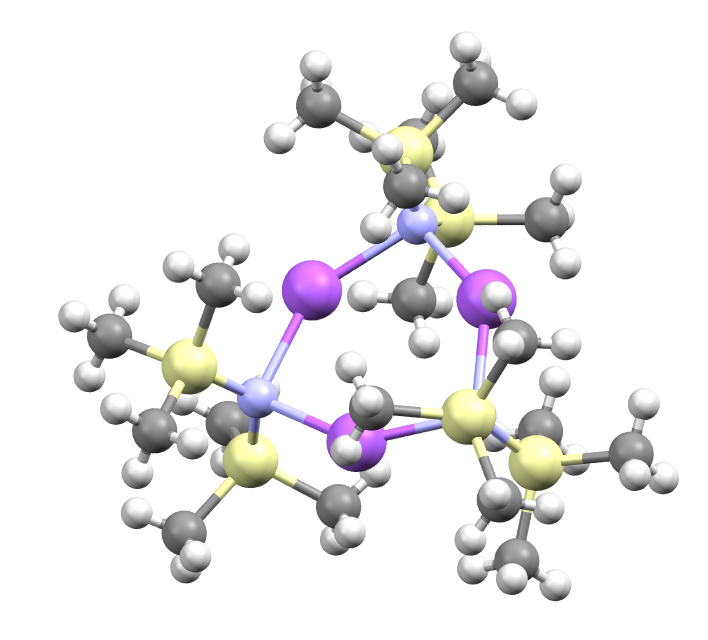

Names
- Preferred IUPAC name Sodium 1,1,1-trimethyl-N-(trimethylsilyl)silanaminide
- Other names Sodium hexamethyldisilazide Sodium hexamethyldisilazane

Identifiers
CAS Number	1070-89-9
3D model (JSmol)	Interactive image
Abbreviations	NaHMDS
Beilstein Reference	3629917
ChemSpider	21169873
ECHA InfoCard	100.012.713
EC Number	213-983-8
PubChem CID	2724254
UNII	X9ZJB79YER
UN number	3263
CompTox Dashboard (EPA)	DTXSID5061451
- InChI: InChI=1S/C6H18NSi2.Na/c1-8(2,3)7- 9(4,5)6;/h1-6H3;/q-1;+1 Key: WRIKHQLVHPKCJU-UHFFFAOYSA-N; InChI=1/C6H18NSi2.Na/c1-8(2,3)7-9(4,5)6;/h1-6H3;/q-1;+1/rC6H18NNaSi2/c1-9(2,3)7(8)10(4,5)6/h1-6H3 Key: WRIKHQLVHPKCJU-JSJAVMDOAQ; InChI=1S/C6H18NSi2.Na/c1-8(2,3)7-9(4,5)6;/h1-6H3;/q-1;+1 Key: WRIKHQLVHPKCJU-UHFFFAOYSA-N
- SMILES: C[Si](C)(C)N([Na])[Si](C)(C)C

Properties
Chemical formula	NaN(Si(CH_{3})_{3})_{2}
Molar mass	183.377 g·mol^{−1}
Appearance	off-white solid
Density	0.9 g/cm^{3}, solid
Melting point	171 to 175 °C (340 to 347 °F; 444 to 448 K)
Boiling point	202 °C (396 °F; 475 K) 2 mmHg
Solubility in water	Reacts with water
Solubility in other solvents	THF, benzene toluene

Structure
Molecular shape	Triangular pyramidal

Hazards
- Occupational safety and health (OHS/OSH)
Main hazards	Highly flammable, corrosive
- GHS labelling
Pictograms	(GHS05: Corrosive) (GHS07: Exclamation mark)
Signal word	Danger
Hazard statements	H302, H312, H314, H332, H412
Precautionary statements	P260, P264, P270, P271, P273, P280, P301+P312, P301+P330+P331, P302+P352, P303+P361+P353, P304+P312, P304+P340, P305+P351+P338, P310, P312, P321, P322, P330, P363, P405, P501

Related compounds
Other cations	Lithium bis(trimethylsilyl)amide (LiHMDS); Potassium bis(trimethylsilyl)amide
Related compounds	Lithium diisopropylamide (LDA); Sodium hydride Potassium hydride
- Except where otherwise noted, data are given for materials in their standard state (at 25 °C [77 °F], 100 kPa). verify (what is ?) Infobox references

Sodium bis(trimethylsilyl)amide is the organosilicon compound with the formula NaN(Si(CH_{3})_{3})_{2}. This species, usually called NaHMDS (sodium hexamethyldisilylamide), is a strong base used for deprotonation reactions or base-catalyzed reactions. Its advantages are that it is commercially available as a solid and it is soluble not only in ethers, such as THF or diethyl ether, but also in aromatic solvents, like benzene and toluene by virtue of the lipophilic TMS groups.

NaHMDS is quickly destroyed by water to form sodium hydroxide and bis(trimethylsilyl)amine.

== Structure ==
Although the Na–N bond is polar covalent as a solid, when dissolved in nonpolar solvents this compound is trimeric, consisting of a central Na_{3}N_{3} ring.

== Applications in synthesis ==
NaHMDS is used as a strong base in organic synthesis. Typical reactions:

- To deprotonate ketones and esters to generate enolate derivatives.
- Generate carbenes by dehydrohalogenation of halocarbons. These carbene reagents add to alkenes to give substituted cyclopropanes and cyclopropenes.
- To deprotonation of phosphonium salts, generating Wittig reagents.

NaHMDS deprotonates compounds containing weakly acidic O–H, S–H, and N–H bonds. These include cyanohydrins and thiols.

NaHMDS converts alkyl halides to amines in a two step process that begins with N-alkylation followed by hydrolysis of the N–Si bonds:

NaN(Si(CH_{3})_{3})_{2} + RX → RN(Si(CH_{3})_{3})_{2} + NaX
RN(Si(CH_{3})_{3})_{2} + H_{2}O → O(Si(CH_{3})_{3})_{2} + RNH_{2}

where X is a halogen and R is an alkyl.

This method has been extended to aminomethylation via the reagent CH_{3}OCH_{2}N(Si(CH_{3})_{3})_{2}, which contains a displaceable methoxy group CH_{3}O–.

== See also ==
- Metal bis(trimethylsilyl)amides
