= Metal bis(trimethylsilyl)amides =

Group of chemicals

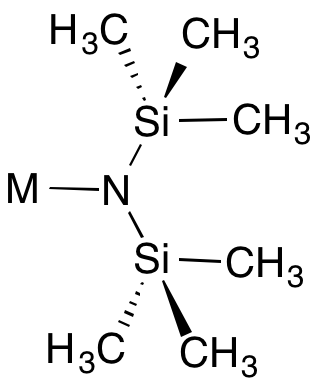
The bis(trimethylsilyl)amide ligand attached to a metal center M.

Metal bis(trimethylsilyl)amides (often abbreviated as metal silylamides) are coordination complexes composed of a cationic metal M with anionic bis(trimethylsilyl)amide ligands (the ^{−}N(Si(CH_{3})_{3})_{2} monovalent anion, or −N(Si(CH_{3})_{3})_{2} monovalent group, and are part of a broader category of metal amides.

Due to the bulky hydrocarbon backbone metal bis(trimethylsilyl)amide complexes have low lattice energies and are lipophilic. For this reason, they are soluble in a range of nonpolar organic solvents, in contrast to simple metal halides, which only dissolve in reactive solvents. These steric bulky complexes are molecular, consisting of mono-, di-, and tetramers. Having a built-in base, these compounds conveniently react with even weakly protic reagents. The class of ligands and pioneering studies on their coordination compounds were described by Bürger and Wannagat.

The ligands are often denoted hmds (e.g. M(N(SiMe_{3})_{2})_{3} = M(hmds)_{3}) in reference to the hexamethyldisilazane from which they are prepared.

== General methods of preparation ==
Apart from group 1 and 2 complexes, a general method for preparing metal bis(trimethylsilyl)amides entails reactions of anhydrous metal chloride with an alkali metal bis(trimethylsilyl)amides via a salt metathesis reaction:

MCl_{n} + n Na(hmds) → M(hmds)_{n} + n NaCl

Alkali metal chloride formed as a by-product typically precipitates as a solid, allowing for its removal by filtration. The remaining metal bis(trimethylsilyl)amide is then often purified by distillation or sublimation.

Space-filling model of Fe[N(SiMe_{3})_{2}]_{2}. Color scheme: H is white, Fe is gray, N is blue (barely visible), Si is blue-green.

== Group 1 complexes ==
Lithium, sodium, and potassium bis(trimethylsilyl)amides are commercially available. When free of solvent, the lithium and sodium complexes are trimeric, and the potassium complex is dimeric in solid state. The lithium reagent may be prepared from n-butyllithium and bis(trimethylsilyl)amine:

^{n}BuLi + HN(SiMe_{3})_{2} → Li(hmds) + butane

The direct reaction of these molten metals with bis(trimethylsilyl)amine at high temperature has also been described:

M + HN(SiMe_{3})_{2} → MN(SiMe_{3})_{2} + 1/2 H_{2}

Alkali metal silylamides are soluble in a range of organic solvents, where they exist as aggregates, and are commonly used in organic chemistry as strong sterically hindered bases. They are also extensively used as precursors for the synthesis other bis(trimethylsilyl)amide complexes (see below).

== Group 2 complexes ==
The calcium and barium complexes may be prepared via the general method, by treating calcium iodide or barium chloride with potassium or sodium bis(trimethylsilyl)amide. However, this method can result in potassium contamination. An improved synthesis involving the reaction of benzylpotassium with calcium iodide, followed by reaction with bis(trimethylsilyl)amine results in potassium-free material:

2 BnK + CaI_{2} + THF → Bn_{2}Ca(thf) + KI
Bn_{2}Ca(thf) + 2 HN(SiMe_{3})_{2} → Ca(hmds)_{2} + 2 C_{6}H_{5}CH_{3} + THF

Magnesium silylamides can be prepared from dibutylmagnesium; which is commercially available as a mixture of n-Bu and s-Bu isomers. It deprotonates the free amine to yield the magnesium bis(trimethylsilyl)amide, itself commercially available.

Bu_{2}Mg + 2 HN(SiMe_{3})_{2} → Mg(hmds)_{2} + 2 butane

In contrast to group 1 metals, the amine N-H in bis(trimethylsilyl)amine is not acidic enough to react with the group 2 metals, however complexes may be prepared via a reaction of tin(II) bis(trimethylsilyl)amide with the appropriate metal:

M + 2 HN(SiMe_{3})_{2} ↛ M(hmds)_{2} + H_{2} (M = Mg, Ca, Sr, Ba)
M + Sn(hmds)_{2} → M(hmds)_{2} + Sn

Long reaction times are required for this synthesis and when performed in the presence of coordinating solvents, such as dimethoxyethane, adducts are formed. Hence non-coordinating solvents such as benzene or toluene must be used to obtain the free complexes.

== p-Block complexes ==
Tin(II) bis(trimethylsilyl)amide is prepared from anhydrous tin(II) chloride and is commercially available. It is used to prepare other metal bis(trimethylsilylamide)s via transmetallation. The group 13 and bismuth(III) bis(trimethylsilyl)amides are prepared in the same manner; the aluminium complex may also be prepared by treating strongly basic lithium aluminium hydride with the parent amine:

LiAlH_{4} + 4 HN(SiMe_{3})_{2} → Li(hmds) + Al(hmds)_{3} + 4 H_{2}

An alternative synthesis of tetrasulfur tetranitride entails the use of a metal bis(trimethylsilyl)amide [(Me_{3}Si)_{2}N]_{2}S as a precursor with pre-formed S–N bonds. [(Me_{3}Si)_{2}N]_{2}S is prepared by the reaction of lithium bis(trimethylsilyl)amide and sulfur dichloride (SCl_{2}).

2 [(CH_{3})_{3}Si]_{2}NLi + SCl_{2} → [((CH_{3})_{3}Si)_{2}N]_{2}S + 2 LiCl

The metal bis(trimethylsilyl)amide [((CH_{3})_{3}Si)_{2}N]_{2}S reacts with the combination of SCl_{2} and sulfuryl chloride (SO_{2}Cl_{2}) to form S_{4}N_{4}, trimethylsilyl chloride, and sulfur dioxide:

2[((CH_{3})_{3}Si)_{2}N]_{2}S + 2SCl_{2} + 2SO_{2}Cl_{2} → S_{4}N_{4} + 8 (CH_{3})_{3}SiCl + 2SO_{2}

Tetraselenium tetranitride, Se_{4}N_{4}, is a compound analogous to tetrasulfur tetranitride and can be synthesized by the reaction of selenium tetrachloride with [((CH_{3})_{3}Si)_{2}N]_{2}Se. The latter compound is a metal bis(trimethylsilyl)amide and can be synthesized by the reaction of selenium tetrachloride (SeCl_{4}), selenium monochloride (Se_{2}Cl_{2}) and lithium bis(trimethylsilyl)amide.

== d-Block complexes ==
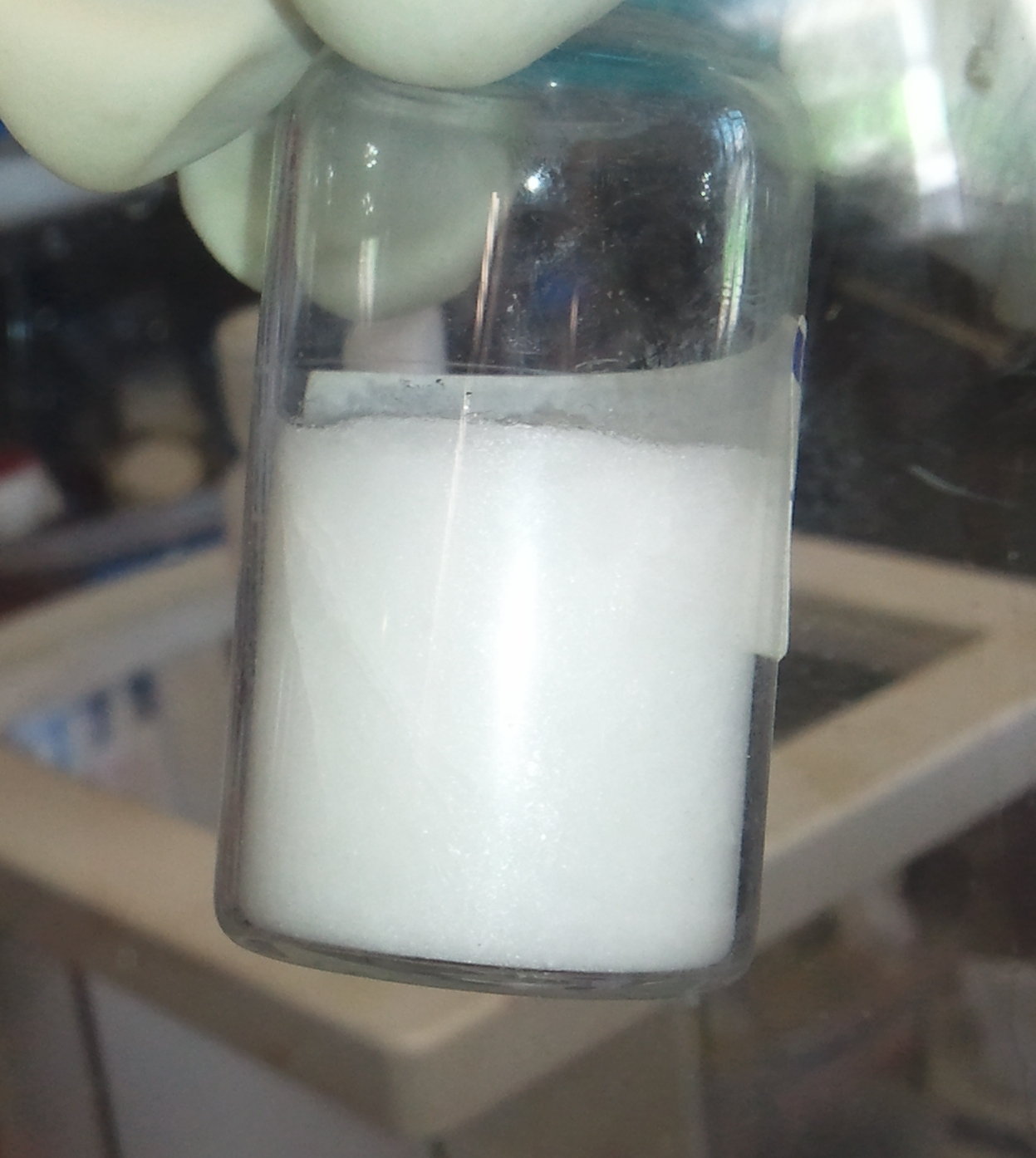
Frozen zinc bis(trimethylsilyl)amide. This compound melts at 12.5 °C.

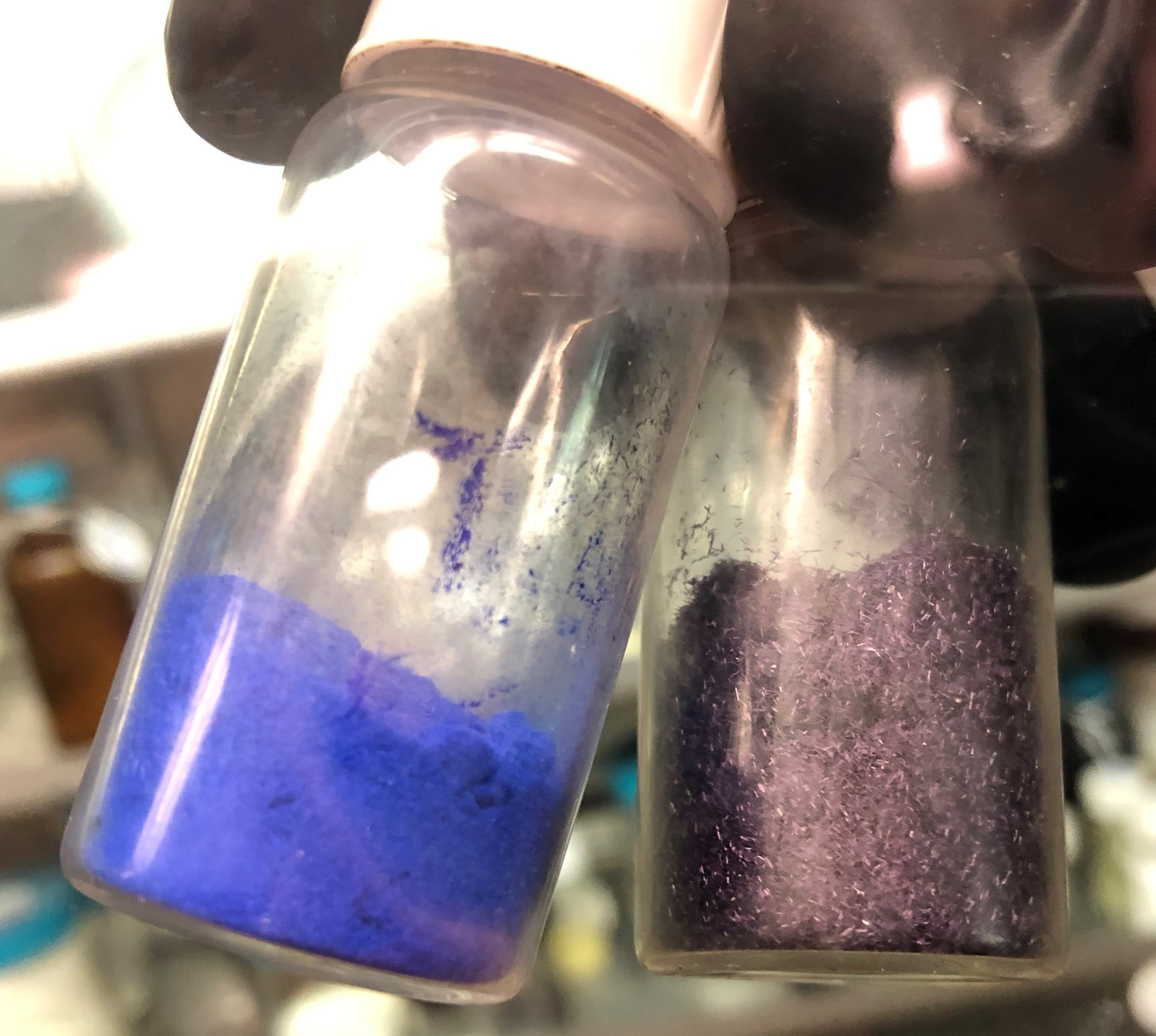
Titanium (left) and vanadium (right) tris{bis(trimethylsilyl)amide}.

In line with the general method, bis(trimethylsilyl)amides of transition metals are prepared by a reaction between the metal halides (typically chlorides) and an alkali metal bis(trimethylsilyl)amide. There is some variation however, for instance the synthesis Ti{N(SiMe_{3})_{2}}_{3} and V{N(SiMe_{3})_{2}}_{3} are prepared using the soluble precursors TiCl_{3}(NMe_{3})_{2} or VCl_{3}(NMe_{3})_{2}, respectively. The melting and boiling points of the complexes decrease across the series, with Group 12 metals being sufficiently volatile to allow purification by distillation.

Iron complexes are notable for having been isolated in both the ferrous (II) and ferric (III) oxidation states. Fe[N(SiMe_{3})_{2}]_{3} can be prepared by treating iron trichloride with lithium bis(trimethylsilyl)amide and is paramagnetic as the high spin iron(III) contains 5 unpaired electrons.

FeCl_{3} + 3LiN(SiMe_{3})_{2} → Fe[N(SiMe_{3})_{2}]_{3} + 3LiCl

Similarly, the two coordinate Fe[N(SiMe_{3})_{2}]_{2} complex is prepared by treating iron dichloride with lithium bis(trimethylsilyl)amide:

FeCl_{2} + 2LiN(SiMe_{3})_{2} → Fe[N(SiMe_{3})_{2}]_{2} + 2LiCl

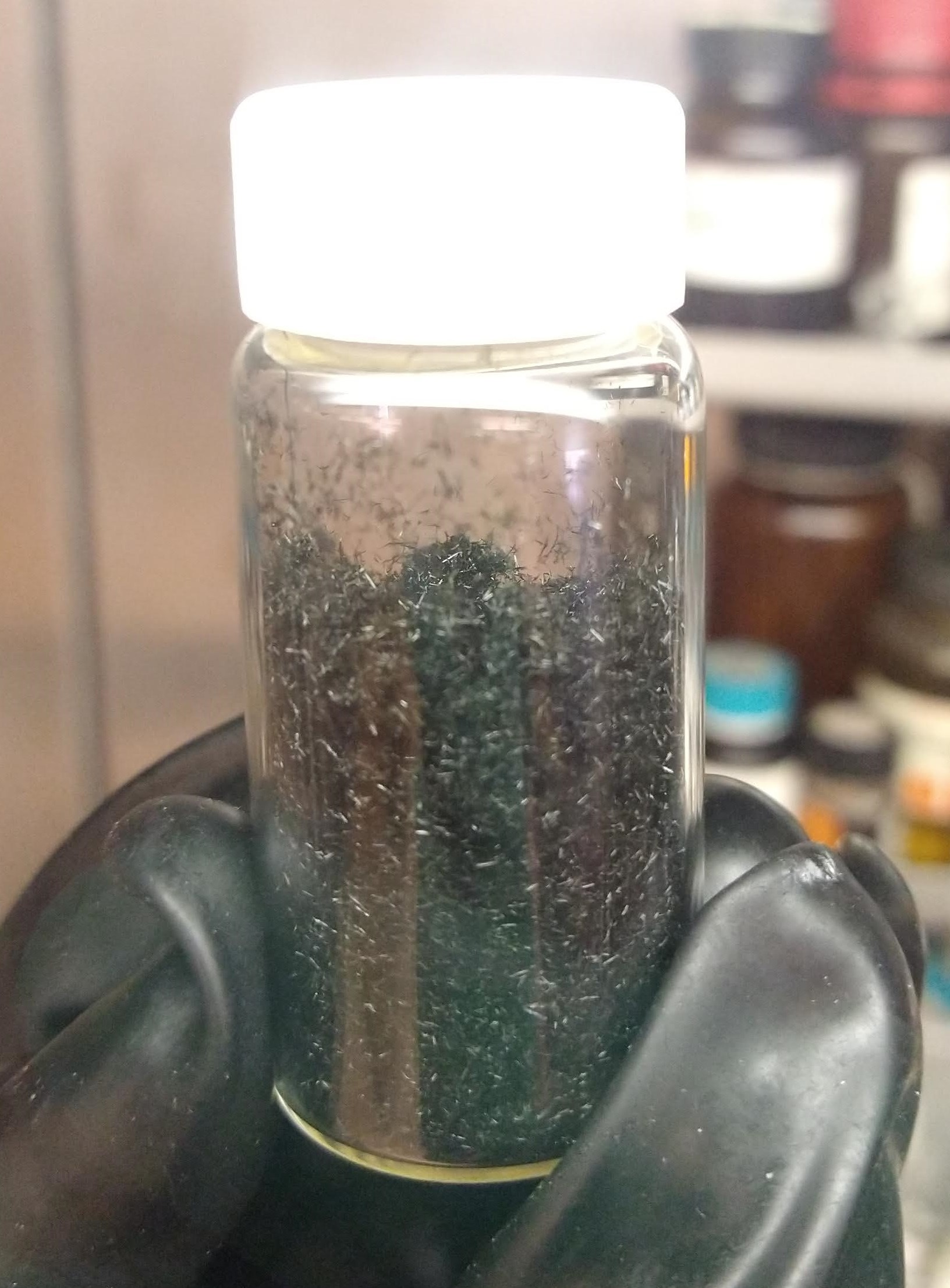
Iron tris{bis(trimethylsilyl)amide}

The dark green Fe[N(SiMe_{3})_{2}]_{2} complex exists in two forms depending on its physical state. In the gas phase, the compound is a monomeric with two-coordinate Fe possessing S_{4} symmetry. In the solid state it forms a dimer with trigonal planar iron centers and bridging amido groups. The low coordination number of the iron complex is largely due to the steric effects of the bulky bis(trimethylsilyl)amide, however the complex will bind THF to give the adduct, {(THF)Fe[N(SiMe_{3})_{2}]_{2}}. Similar behavior can be seen in Mn(hmds)_{2} and Co(hmds)_{2}, which are monomeric in the gas phase and dimeric in the crystalline phase. Group 11 complexes are especially prone to oligomerization, forming tetramers in the solid phase. The Lewis acid properties of the group 12 complexes have been reported and the improved E and C numbers for the Zn and Cd complexes are listed in the ECW model.

Compound	Appearance	m.p. (°C)	b.p. (°C)	Spin	Comment
Group 3 complexes
Sc(hmds)_{3}	Colorless solid	172-174		S = 0	
Y(hmds)_{3}	White solid	180-184	105 °C/10 mmHg (subl.)	S = 0	Commercially available
Group 4 complexes
Ti(hmds)_{3}	Bright blue solid			S = 1/2	Prepared from TiCl_{3}(N(CH_{3})_{3})_{2}
Group 5 complexes
V(hmds)_{3}	Dark violet solid	174-176		S = 1	Prepared from VCl_{3}(N(CH_{3})_{3})_{2}
Group 6 complexes
Cr(hmds)_{3}	Apple-green solid	120	110 / 0.5 mmHg (subl.)	S = 3/2	
Group 7 complexes
Mn(hmds)_{2}	Beige solid		100 / 0.2 mmHg	S = 5/2	
Mn(hmds)_{3}	Violet solid	108-110		S = 2	
Group 8 complexes
Fe(hmds)_{2}	Light green solid		90-100 / 0.01 mmHg		
Fe(hmds)_{3}	Dark green solid		120 / 0.5 mmHg (subl.)	S = 5/2	
Group 9 complexes
Co(hmds)	Black Solid				Tetrameric in the solid state
Co(hmds)_{2}	Green solid	73	101 / 0.6 mmHg		
Co(hmds)_{3}	Dark olive green solid	86-88		S = 2	
Group 10 complexes
Ni(hmds)	Black solid	>250			Tetrameric in the solid state
Ni(hmds)_{2}	Red liquid		80 / 0.2 mmHg		
Group 11 complexes
Cu(hmds)	Colorless solid		180 / 0.2 mmHg (subl.)	S = 0	
Ag(hmds)	Colorless solid			S = 0	Insoluble in hydrocarbons and diethyl ether
Au(hmds)	Colorless solid			S = 0	
Group 12 complexes
Zn(hmds)_{2}	Colorless liquid	12.5	82 / 0.5 mmHg	S = 0	Commercially available
Cd(hmds)_{2}	Colorless liquid	8	93 / 0.5 mmHg	S = 0	
Hg(hmds)_{2}	Colorless liquid	11	78 / 0.15 mmHg	S = 0	

== f-Block complexes ==
Lanthanide triflates can be convenient anhydrous precursors to many bis(trimethylsilyl)amides:

Ln(OTf)_{3} + 3 M(hmds) → Ln(hmds)_{3} + 3 MOTf (M = Li, Na, K; Ln = La, Nd, Sm, Er)

However it is more common to see the preparation of lanthanide bis(trimethylsilyl)amides from anhydrous lanthanide chlorides, as these are cheaper. The reaction is performed in THF and requires a period at reflux. Once formed, the product is separated from LiCl by exchanging the solvent for toluene, in which Ln(hmds)_{3} is soluble but LiCl is not.

Ln(Cl)_{3} + 3 HMDS + 3 ^{n}BuLi → Ln(hmds)_{3} + 3 LiCl + 3 butane (Ln = La, Ce, Pr, Nd, Sm, Eu, Gd, Ho, Yb, and Lu)

Silylamides are important as starting materials in lanthanide chemistry, as lanthanide chlorides have either poor solubility or poor stability in common solvents. As a result of this nearly all lanthanide silylamides are commercially available.

Compound	Appearance	m.p. (°C)	Comment
La(hmds)_{3}	White	145-149	
Ce(hmds)_{3}	Yellow-brown	132-140	
Pr(hmds)_{3}	Pale green	155-158	
Nd(hmds)_{3}	Pale blue	161-164	
Sm(hmds)_{3}	Pale yellow	155-158	
Eu(hmds)_{3}	Orange	159-162	
Gd(hmds)_{3}	White	160-163	
Dy(hmds)_{3}	Pale green	157–160	
Ho(hmds)_{3}	Cream	161-164	
Yb(hmds)_{3}	Yellow	162-165	
Lu(hmds)_{3}	White	167-170	

There has also been some success in the synthesis and characterization of actinide bis(trimethylsilyl)amides. A convenient synthetic route uses the THF-adducts of the iodide salts AnI_{3}(THF)_{4} as starting materials.

Compound	Appearance	m.p. (°C)	Comment
U(hmds)_{3}	Red-purple	137–140	Sublimates at 80–100 °C (ca. 10^{−3} torr)
Np(hmds)_{3}	Blue-black		Sublimates at 60 °C (ca. 10^{−4} torr)
Pu(hmds)_{3}	Yellow-orange		Sublimates at 60 °C (ca. 10^{−4} torr)

== Safety ==
Metal bis(trimethylsilyl)amides are strong bases. They are corrosive, and are incompatible with many chlorinated solvents. These compounds react vigorously with water, and should be manipulated with air-free technique. Additionally, care must be taken with paper products such as Kimwipes contaminated with these compounds, as the heat generated by their reaction with air can be sufficient to ignite the paper.
