= Ammonia (disambiguation) =

Ammonia is a chemical compound with the formula NH_{3}.

Ammonia may also refer to:

- Ammonia (band), an Australian rock band
- Ammonia (foraminifera), a widespread genus of estuarine foraminiferan
- Ammonium hydroxide, a cleaning chemical commonly referred to as ammonia
- Hera Ammonia, an epithet of Greek goddess Hera
- Ammonia, the ancient name of Mersa Matruh
- SF Ammonia, a railway ferry in Norway
- Ammonia (data page)

== See also ==
- Pneumonia
