= W43 =

W43 may refer to:

- Compound of cube and octahedron
- Shimo-Shibetsu Station, in Hokkaido, Japan
- Westerhout 43, a star-forming region
- Woodward's 43, a skyscraper in Vancouver, Canada
