= NH 5 =

NH5 can refer to:

- National Highway 5 (Cambodia)
- National Highway 5 (Djibouti)
- National Highway 5 (India)
  - National Highway 5 (India, old numbering)
- N-5 National Highway
- Nitrogen pentahydride

== See also ==
- List of highways numbered 5
