= Ammonia fountain =

Type of chemical demonstration

The ammonia fountain is a type of chemical demonstration. The experiment consists of introducing water through an inlet to a container filled with ammonia gas. Ammonia dissolves into the water and the pressure in the container drops. As a result, more water is forced into the container from another inlet creating a fountain effect. The demonstration introduces concepts like solubility and the gas laws at entry level.

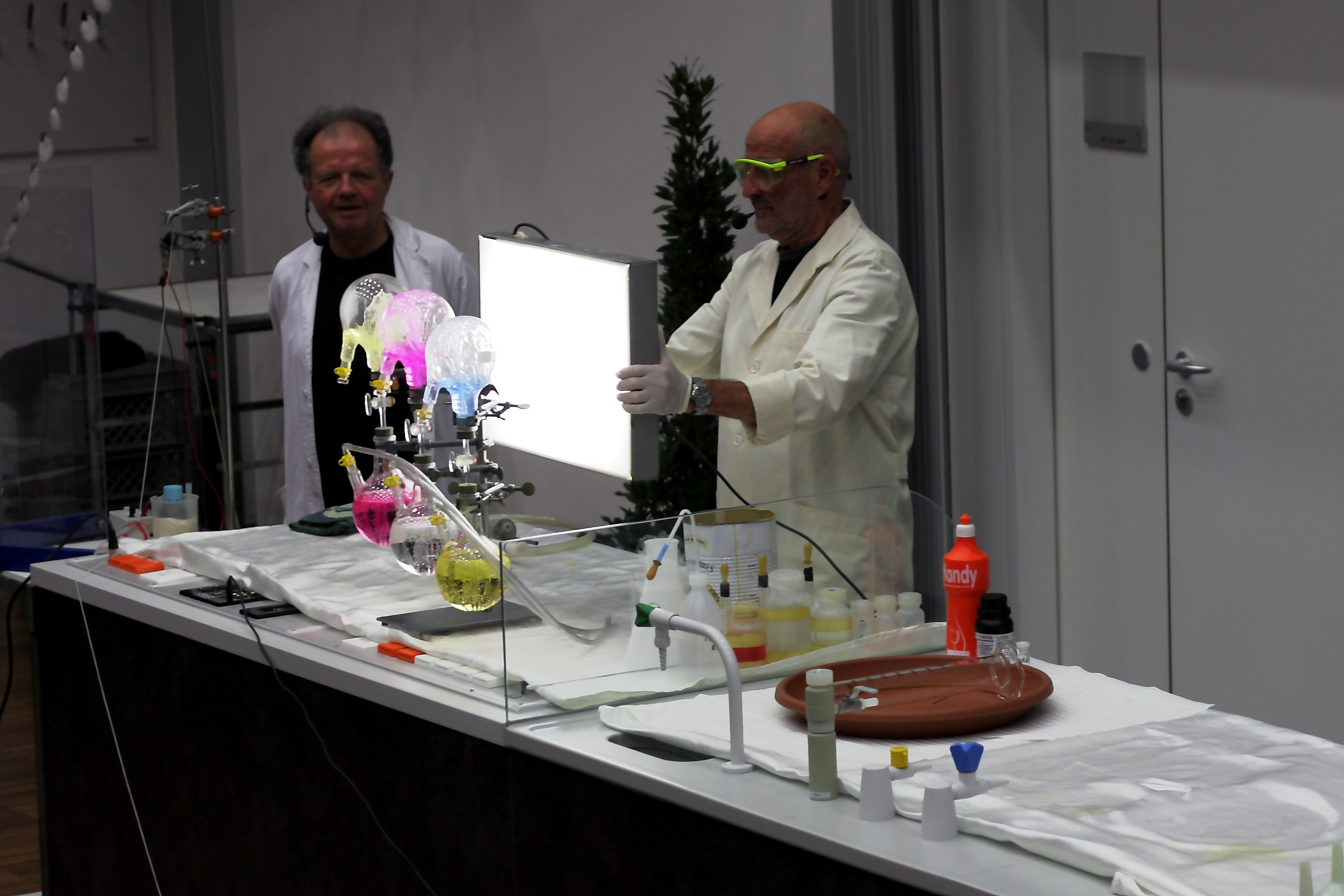
An ammonia fountain demonstration

A different gas of comparable solubility in water, such as hydrogen chloride, can be used instead of ammonia.

If the ammonia is replaced by a liquid vapor, such as water vapor, at a pressure higher than its room-temperature vapor pressure, a similar effect is produced. In this case, the reduction in pressure in the container is due to condensation of the vapor as the container cools to room temperature. Another reported variation involves copper sulfate.
