= Sulfur sticks =

Ammonia detection tool

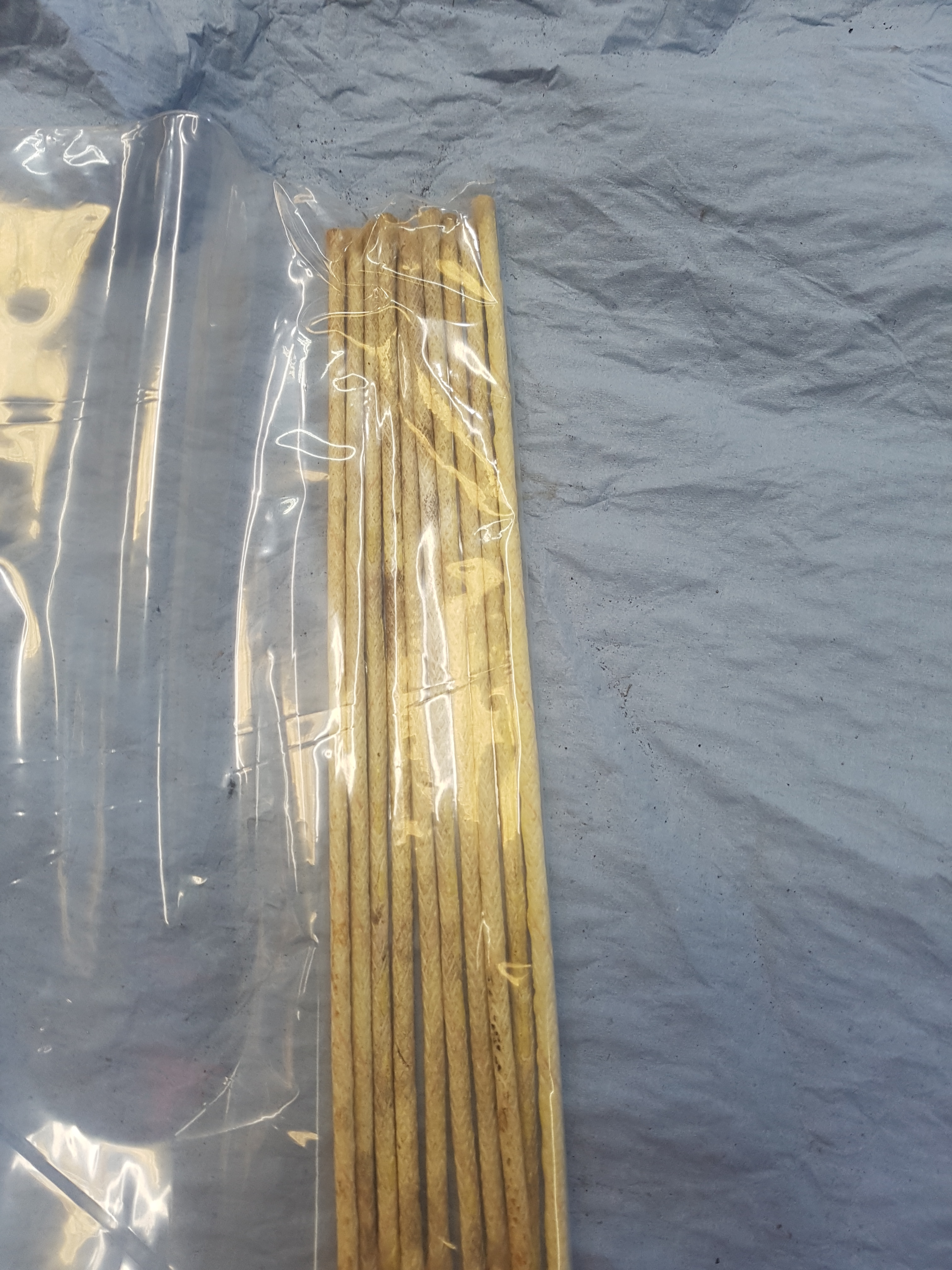
Sulfur sticks sold in a bundle

Sulfur sticks are tools used in industrial ammonia refrigeration systems to detect minor ammonia leaks. A sulfur stick is made from a wick which contains particles of sulfur. The sulfur stick is lit and burns with an open flame, and the color of the sulfur smoke is used to find the leak. When there is no ammonia present, the smoke is colorless, but the combination of sulfur and ammonia vapors produce a white fog.

The reaction between the sulfur dioxide formed by burning the stick and ammonia gas mainly produces ammonium sulfite. The monohydrate and metabisulfite of this substance is also formed.

== See also ==
- Litmus
- Smoke testing
