= Ammonia (data page) =

Chemical data page

This page provides supplementary chemical data on ammonia.

== Structure and properties ==
Molecular structure
Point group	C_{3v}
Bond length	101.2 pm (N–H)
Bond angle	106.7° (H–N–H)
Bond strength	435 kJ/mol (H–NH_{2})
Crystal data
Crystal structure	?
Properties
Dipole moment	1.46 D
Dielectric constant	22 ε_{0} at 239 K
Magnetic susceptibility	diamagnetic
Acidity of NH_{4}^{+} (pK_{a})	9.25

== Thermodynamic properties ==
Phase diagram and crystalline states of ammonia I. cubic, II. hcp, III. fcc, IV. orthorhombic

Phase behavior
Triple point	195.4 K (−77.75 °C), 6.060 kPa
Critical point	405.5 K (132.3 °C), 11.300 MPa
Std enthalpy change of fusion, Δ_{fus}H^{~~o~~}	+5.653 kJ/mol
Std entropy change of fusion, Δ_{fus}S^{~~o~~}	+28.93 J/(mol·K)
Std enthalpy change of vaporization, Δ_{vap}H^{~~o~~}	+23.35 kJ/mol at BP of −33.4 °C
Std entropy change of vaporization, Δ_{vap}S^{~~o~~}	+97.41 J/(mol·K) at BP of −33.4 °C
Solid properties
Std enthalpy change of formation, Δ_{f}H^{~~o~~}_{solid}	? kJ/mol
Standard molar entropy, S^{~~o~~}_{solid}	? J/(mol K)
Heat capacity, c_{p}	? J/(mol K)
Liquid properties
Std enthalpy change of formation, Δ_{f}H^{~~o~~}_{liquid}	−80.882 ± 0.053 kJ/mol
Standard molar entropy, S^{~~o~~}_{liquid}	? J/(mol K)
Heat capacity, c_{p}	80.80 J/(mol K)
Gas properties
Std enthalpy change of formation, Δ_{f}H^{~~o~~}_{gas}	−45.556 ± 0.029 kJ/mol
Std Gibbs free energy change of formation, Δ_{f}G^{~~o~~}_{gas}	−16.6 kJ/mol
Standard molar entropy, S^{~~o~~}_{gas}	192.77 J/(mol K)
Heat capacity, c_{p}	35.06 J/(mol K)
Heat capacity ratio, γ at 15 °C	1.310
van der Waals' constants	a = 422.5 L^{2} kPa/mol^{2} b = 0.03707 L/mol

== Vapor–liquid equilibrium data ==
P in mm Hg	1	10	40	100	400	760	1520	3800	7600	15600	30400	45600
T in °C	−109.1_{(s)}	−91.9_{(s)}	−79.2_{(s)}	−68.4	−45.4	−33.6	−18.7	4.7	25.7	50.1	78.9	98.3

Table data (above) obtained from CRC Handbook of Chemistry and Physics 44th ed. The (s) notation indicates equilibrium temperature of vapor over solid. Otherwise temperature is equilibrium of vapor over liquid.

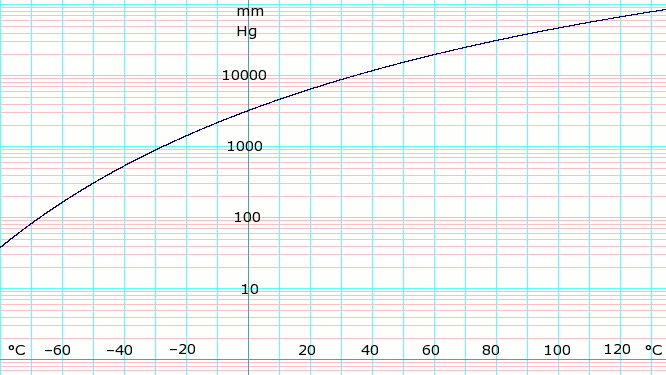
log_{10} of anhydrous ammonia vapor pressure. Uses formula shown below.

Vapor-pressure formula for ammonia:

log_{10}P = A – B / (T − C),

where P is pressure in kPa, and T is temperature in kelvins;

A = 6.67956, B = 1002.711, C = 25.215 for T = 190 K through 333 K.

Vapor over anhydrous ammonia
Temp.	Pressure	ρ of liquid	ρ of vapor	Δ_{vap}H
−78 °C	5.90 kPa
−75 °C	7.93 kPa	0.73094 g/cm^{3}	7.8241×10^{−5} g/cm^{3}
−70 °C	10.92 kPa	0.72527 g/cm^{3}	1.1141×10^{−4} g/cm^{3}
−65 °C	15.61 kPa	0.71953 g/cm^{3}	1.5552×10^{−4} g/cm^{3}
−60 °C	21.90 kPa	0.71378 g/cm^{3}	2.1321×10^{−4} g/cm^{3}
−55 °C	30.16 kPa	0.70791 g/cm^{3}	2.8596×10^{−4} g/cm^{3}
−50 °C	40.87 kPa	0.70200 g/cm^{3}	3.8158×10^{−4} g/cm^{3}	1417 J/g
−45 °C	54.54 kPa	0.69604 g/cm^{3}	4.9940×10^{−4} g/cm^{3}	1404 J/g
−40 °C	71.77 kPa	0.68999 g/cm^{3}	6.4508×10^{−4} g/cm^{3}	1390 J/g
−35 °C	93.19 kPa	0.68385 g/cm^{3}	8.2318×10^{−4} g/cm^{3}	1375 J/g
−30 °C	119.6 kPa	0.67764 g/cm^{3}	1.0386×10^{−3} g/cm^{3}	1361 J/g
−25 °C	151.6 kPa	0.67137 g/cm^{3}	1.2969×10^{−3} g/cm^{3}	1345 J/g
−20 °C	190.2 kPa	0.66503 g/cm^{3}	1.6039×10^{−3} g/cm^{3}	1330 J/g
−15 °C	236.3 kPa	0.65854 g/cm^{3}	1.9659×10^{−3} g/cm^{3}	1314 J/g
−10 °C	290.8 kPa	0.65198 g/cm^{3}	2.3874×10^{−3} g/cm^{3}	1297 J/g
−5 °C	354.8 kPa	0.64533 g/cm^{3}	2.8827×10^{−3} g/cm^{3}	1280 J/g
0 °C	429.4 kPa	0.63857 g/cm^{3}	3.4528×10^{−3} g/cm^{3}	1263 J/g
5 °C	515.7 kPa	0.63167 g/cm^{3}	4.1086×10^{−3} g/cm^{3}	1245 J/g
10 °C	614.9 kPa	0.62469 g/cm^{3}	4.8593×10^{−3} g/cm^{3}	1226 J/g
15 °C	728.3 kPa	0.61755 g/cm^{3}	5.7153×10^{−3} g/cm^{3}	1207 J/g
20 °C	857.1 kPa	0.61028 g/cm^{3}	6.6876×10^{−3} g/cm^{3}	1187 J/g
25 °C	1003 kPa	0.60285 g/cm^{3}	7.7882×10^{−3} g/cm^{3}	1167 J/g
30 °C	1166 kPa	0.59524 g/cm^{3}	9.0310×10^{−3} g/cm^{3}	1146 J/g
35 °C	1350 kPa	0.58816 g/cm^{3}	1.0431×10^{−2} g/cm^{3}	1124 J/g
40 °C	1554 kPa	0.57948 g/cm^{3}	1.2006×10^{−2} g/cm^{3}	1101 J/g
45 °C	1781 kPa	0.57130 g/cm^{3}	1.3775×10^{−2} g/cm^{3}	1083 J/g
50 °C	2032 kPa	0.56287 g/cm^{3}	1.5761×10^{−2} g/cm^{3}	1052 J/g
55 °C	2310 kPa	0.55420 g/cm^{3}
60 °C	2613 kPa	0.54523 g/cm^{3}	2.05×10^{−2} g/cm^{3}
65 °C	2947 kPa	0.53596 g/cm^{3}
70 °C	3312 kPa	0.52632 g/cm^{3}	2.65×10^{−2} g/cm^{3}
75 °C	3711 kPa	0.51626 g/cm^{3}
80 °C	4144 kPa	0.50571 g/cm^{3}	3.41×10^{−2} g/cm^{3}
85 °C	4614 kPa	0.49463 g/cm^{3}
90 °C	5123 kPa	0.48290 g/cm^{3}	4.39×10^{−2} g/cm^{3}
95 °C	5672 kPa	0.47041 g/cm^{3}
100 °C	6264 kPa	0.45693 g/cm^{3}	5.68×10^{−2} g/cm^{3}
Temp.	Pressure	ρ of liquid	ρ of vapor	Δ_{vap}H
The table above gives properties of the vapor–liquid equilibrium of anhydrous ammonia at various temperatures. The second column is vapor pressure in kPa. The third column is the density of the liquid phase. The fourth column is the density of the vapor. The fifth column is the heat of vaporization needed to convert one gram of liquid to vapor.

Freezing curve of ammonia-water system. Three eutectic points I. II. and III. are shown. Left of the I. point the frozen component is ice. Right of the III. point the frozen component is ammonia.

Vapor over aqueous ammonia solution
Temp.	%wt NH_{3}	Partial pressure NH_{3}	Partial pressure H_{2}O
0 °C	4.72	1.52 kPa	0.68 kPa
0 °C	9.15	3.31 kPa	0.71 kPa
0 °C	14.73	6.84 kPa	0.55 kPa
0 °C	19.62	11.0 kPa	0.40 kPa
0 °C	22.90	14.9 kPa	0.37 kPa
10 °C	4.16	2.20 kPa	1.21 kPa
10 °C	8.26	4.96 kPa	1.17 kPa
10 °C	12.32	8.56 kPa	1.01 kPa
10 °C	15.88	12.68 kPa	0.93 kPa
10 °C	20.54	19.89 kPa	0.83 kPa
10 °C	21.83	22.64 kPa	0.73 kPa
19.9 °C	4.18	3.65 kPa	2.19 kPa
19.9 °C	6.50	6.11 kPa	2.15 kPa
19.9 °C	6.55	6.13 kPa	2.13 kPa
19.9 °C	7.72	7.49 kPa	2.08 kPa
19.9 °C	10.15	10.75 kPa	2.01 kPa
19.9 °C	10.75	11.51 kPa	1.96 kPa
19.9 °C	16.64	22.14 kPa	1.72 kPa
19.9 °C	19.40	28.74 kPa	1.64 kPa
19.9 °C	23.37	40.32 kPa	1.37 kPa
30.09 °C	3.93	5.49 kPa	4.15 kPa
30.09 °C	7.43	11.51 kPa	3.89 kPa
30.09 °C	9.75	16.00 kPa	3.80 kPa
30.09 °C	12.77	23.33 kPa	3.55 kPa
30.09 °C	17.76	38.69 kPa	3.31 kPa
30.09 °C	17.84	38.81 kPa	3.24 kPa
30.09 °C	21.47	53.94 kPa	2.95 kPa
40 °C	3.79	8.15 kPa	7.13 kPa
40 °C	7.36	17.73 kPa	6.76 kPa
40 °C	11.06	29.13 kPa	6.55 kPa
40 °C	15.55	47.14 kPa	5.52 kPa
40 °C	17.33	57.02 kPa
40 °C	20.85	76.81 kPa	5.04 kPa
50 °C	3.29	10.54 kPa	11.95 kPa
50 °C	5.90	20.17 kPa	11.61 kPa
50 °C	8.91	32.88 kPa	11.07 kPa
50 °C	11.57	45.56 kPa	10.75 kPa
50 °C	14.15	60.18 kPa	10.27 kPa
50 °C	14.94	64.94 kPa	10.03 kPa
60 °C	3.86	18.25 kPa	19.21 kPa
60 °C	5.77	28.78 kPa
60 °C	7.78	40.05 kPa	18.47 kPa
60 °C	9.37	50.09 kPa	18.07 kPa
60 °C	9.37	63.43 kPa	17.39 kPa
Temp.	%wt NH_{3}	Partial Pressure; NH_{3}	Partial Pressure; H_{2}O

== Heat capacity of liquid and vapor ==
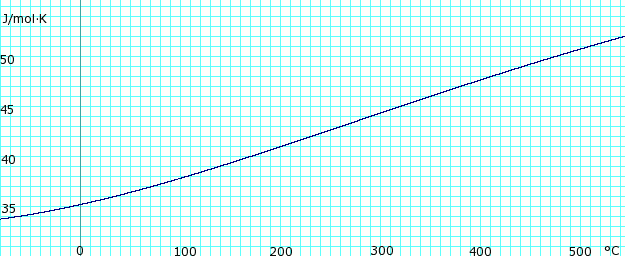
Heat capacity, c_{p}, of anhydrous ammonia gas. Uses polynomial obtained from CHERIC.

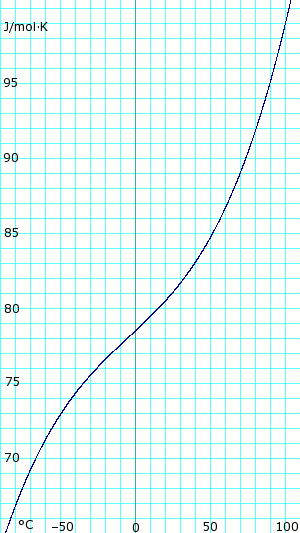
Heat capacity of anhydrous liquid ammonia. Uses polynomial obtained from CHERIC.

== Spectral data ==
UV-Vis
λ_{max}	None nm
Extinction coefficient, ε	None
IR
Major absorption bands	3444, 3337, 1627, 950 cm^{−1}
NMR
Proton NMR
Carbon-13 NMR	None – no carbons
Other NMR data
MS
Masses of main fragments	17 (100%); 16(80%); 15(9%)

== Regulatory data ==
Regulatory data
EINECS number	231-635-3 (gas); 215-647-6 (soln.)
EU index number	007-001-00-5 (gas); 007-001-01-2 (soln.)
PEL-TWA (OSHA)	50 ppm (35 mg/m^{3})
IDLH (NIOSH)	300 ppm
Flash point	11 °C
Autoignition temperature	651 °C
Explosive limits	15–28%
RTECS #	BO0875000

== Safety data sheet ==
The handling of this chemical may incur notable safety precautions... It is highly recommend that you seek the Safety Data Sheet (SDS) for this chemical from a reliable source and follow its directions.

- SIRI
- Science Stuff (Ammonia Solution)
