= Ethanolamine ammonia-lyase =

ethanolamine ammonia-lyase

Identifiers
- EC no.: 4.3.1.7
- CAS no.: 9054-69-7

Databases
- IntEnz: IntEnz view
- BRENDA: BRENDA entry
- ExPASy: NiceZyme view
- KEGG: KEGG entry
- MetaCyc: metabolic pathway
- PRIAM: profile
- PDB structures: RCSB PDB PDBe PDBsum
- Gene Ontology: AmiGO / QuickGO
Search
- PMC: articles
- PubMed: articles
- NCBI: proteins

The enzyme ethanolamine ammonia-lyase (EC 4.3.1.7) catalyzes the chemical reaction

ethanolamine $\rightleftharpoons$ acetaldehyde + NH_{3}

This enzyme belongs to the family of lyases, specifically ammonia lyases, which cleave carbon-nitrogen bonds. The systematic name of this enzyme class is ethanolamine ammonia-lyase (acetaldehyde-forming). It is also called ethanolamine deaminase. It participates in glycerophospholipid metabolism. It employs one cofactor, adenosylcobalamin.

== Structural studies ==
As of early 2011, several structures have been solved for this class of enzymes. The first structure solved was the active site containing EutB subunit of EAL from Listeria monocytogenes with the PDB accession code 2QEZ. Later, more structures have become available from Escherichia coli that include both EAL subunits bound to various ligands.
