= Westerhout 43 =

Region of star formation in the constellation Aquila

Molecular cloud
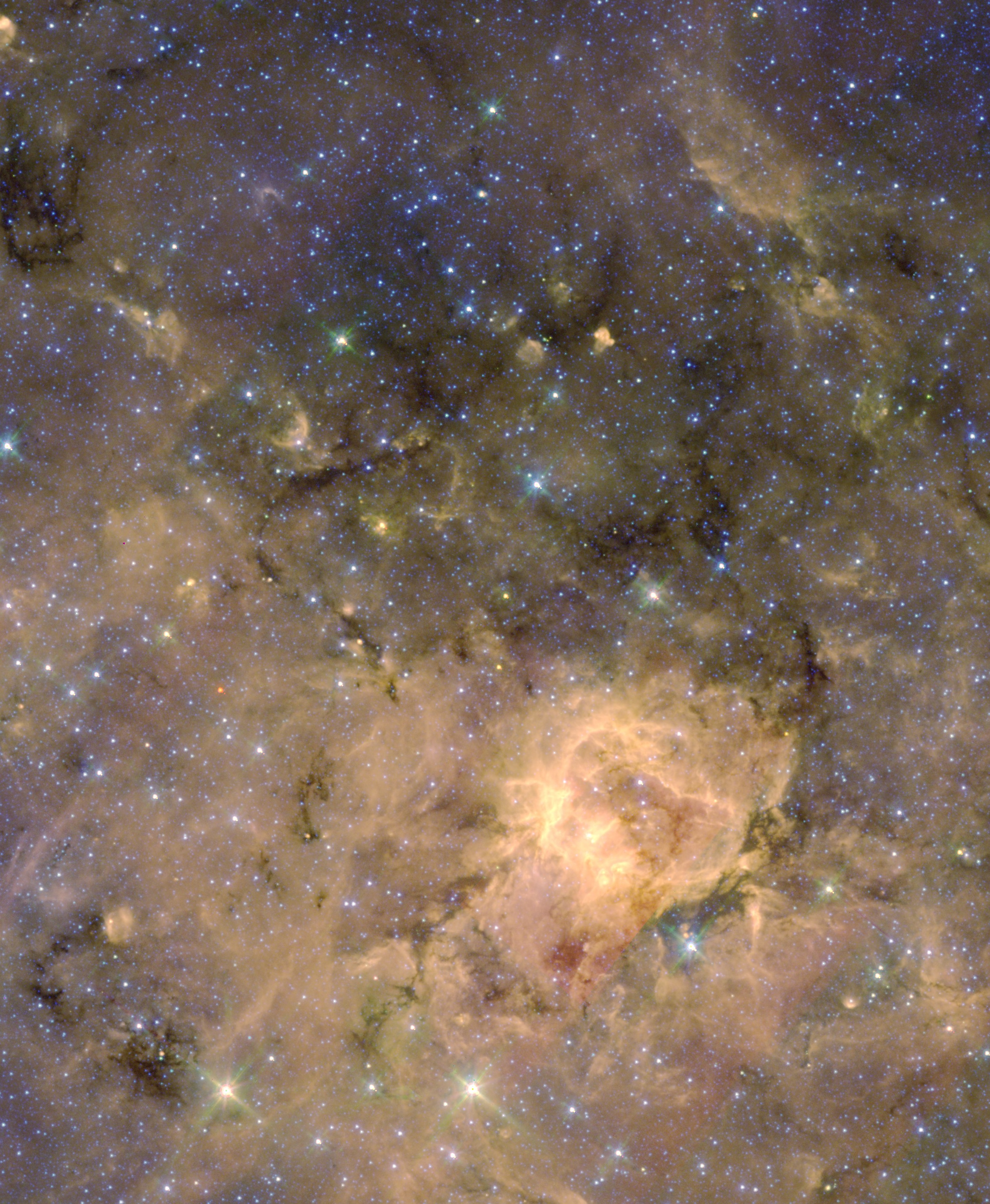

Observation data: J2000 epoch
- Right ascension: 18^{h} 47^{m} 32.4^{s}
- Declination: −01° 56′ 31″
- Distance: 20000 ly (6000 pc)
- Apparent dimensions (V): 6.3′
- Constellation: Aquila
- Designations: SNR G030.8-00.0, 3C 390.2

Westerhout 43, also known as W43, is a region of star formation of our galaxy located in the constellation of Aquila at a distance of 6 kilo-parsecs (nearly 20,000 light-years) of the Sun, that is considered the region of the Milky Way that is most actively forming stars. Despite this, however, it is so heavily obscured by the interstellar dust that it is totally invisible in the optical and must be studied using other wavelengths that are not affected by it, such as the infrared or the radio waves.

== Physical properties ==
This star-forming region is located in the 5-kpc ring, a ring with that radius that encircles the central bar of our galaxy and that contains most of its molecular hydrogen as well as most of its star formation.

It is associated with a very massive complex of molecular clouds with a total mass of more than 7 million times more than the Sun and which is forming stars of all masses within star clusters that are less massive versions of those found on starburst galaxies; it still has capacity to form more clusters.

There are also massive protostars as well as stellar clusters in formation embedded within the nebula, with this star formation region likened to NGC 3603

W43's center, finally, contains a dense and massive star cluster with several O stars and Wolf-Rayet stars that has been compared due to its compactness to NGC 3603 or even Large Magellanic Cloud's R136.
