= Nitrogen pentahydride =

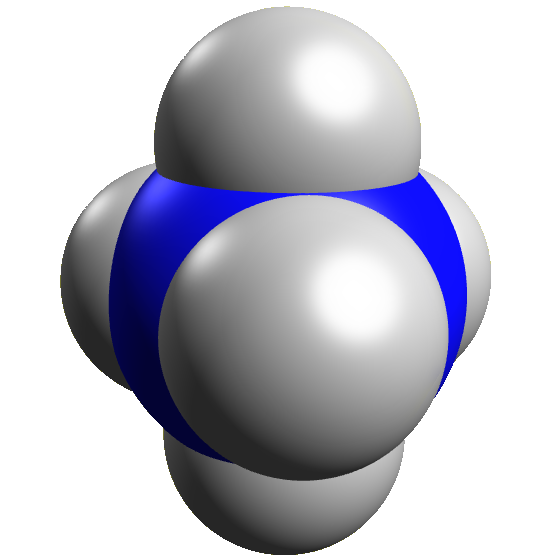
- A possible structure of nitrogen pentahydride according to theory calculations

Names
- Other names Ammonium hydride

Identifiers
| CAS Number | 73655-04-6 |
| 3D model (JSmol) | covalent: Interactive image; ionic: Interactive image |
- InChI: InChI=1S/H5N/h1H5 Key: QPGNFWUGXLWWDO-UHFFFAOYSA-N
- SMILES: covalent: [NH5]; ionic: [H-].[NH4+]

Properties
| Chemical formula | H_{5}N |
| Molar mass | 19.047 g·mol^{−1} |

Structure
| Molecular shape | Trigonal bipyramidal molecular geometry (covalent) |
| Dipole moment | 0 D (covalent) |
- Except where otherwise noted, data are given for materials in their standard state (at 25 °C [77 °F], 100 kPa). Infobox references

Nitrogen pentahydride, also known as ammonium hydride, is a hypothetical compound with the chemical formula NH_{5}. There are two theoretical structures of nitrogen pentahydride. One structure is trigonal bipyramidal molecular geometry type NH_{5} molecule. Its nitrogen atom and hydrogen atoms are covalently bounded, and its symmetry group is D_{3h}. Another predicted structure of nitrogen pentahydride is an ionic compound, composed of an ammonium ion and a hydride ion (NH_{4}^{+}H^{−}). Until now, no one has synthesized this substance, or proved its existence, and related experiments have not directly observed nitrogen pentahydride. It is only speculated that it may be a reactive intermediate based on reaction products. Theoretical calculations show this molecule is thermodynamically unstable. The reason might be similar to the instability of nitrogen pentafluoride, so the possibility of its existence is low. However, nitrogen pentahydride might exist in special conditions or high pressure. Nitrogen pentahydride was considered for use as a solid rocket fuel for research in 1966.

== Research and attempts ==
Some studies believe that nitrogen pentahydride may exist in the formation of other metal atoms crystal lattice, such as mercury and lithium. There are also related studies to explore the possibility of a substitution reaction with ammonium halide. There are also attempts to react ammonium and deuterium to produce the pentahydride, however some experiments show that it may only be a reactive intermediate, which will immediately decompose into ammonia and hydrogen, and the same is true for experiments using deuterium. However, all the studies above are only theoretical calculations, the existence of nitrogen pentahydride has not been observed, and this substance has not been shown to exist.

An experimental attempted to do a displacement reaction between ammonium trifluoroacetate and lithium hydride in the molten state, in order to study the possibility of the existence of nitrogen pentahydride:

CF_{3}COONH_{4} + LiH → CF_{3}COOLi + [NH_{4}H]

In the reaction between ammonium trifluoroacetate and lithium deuteride, the product ammonia contains 85% of ordinary ammonia and 15% of monodeuterated ammonia. The product hydrogen contains 66% of hydrogen deuteride, 21% of hydrogen gas and 13% of deuterium gas. In the product collected using tetradeuterated ammonium trifluoroacetate and lithium hydride, ammonia contains ND_{3}, NHD_{2} and NH_{2}D, while hydrogen contains 68% of hydrogen deuteride, 18% of hydrogen gas and 14% of deuterium gas. Therefore, it is speculated that the reaction may have two routes: one is to directly decompose into ammonia and hydrogen, the other is to first generate ammonium deuteride reactive intermediates, partly by forming deuterium anions and hydrogen cations to form deuterated hydrogen and ammonia and by the formation of hydride ions or deuterium cations to decompose into hydrogen or deuterium gas.

But it immediately decomposed into hydrogen and ammonia, and it was impossible to prove its existence. Experiments with deuterium still get the same results:

[NH_{4}H] → NH_{3} + H_{2}

== Structure ==
Possible structures of covalently bounded nitrogen pentahydride

Several papers have conducted theoretical calculations on nitrogen pentahydride, and believe that nitrogen pentahydride is unlikely to form ionic crystals of hydride and ammonium ions. However, it is possible that hydrogen is connected to one of the hydrogen atoms of ammonium. It may also be similar to nitrogen pentafluoride, forming a three-center two-electron bond similar to carbonium ions, or those five hydrogen atoms are arranged in a triangular bipyramid structure around the nitrogen atom.

== Related compounds ==
A compound that is similar to nitrogen pentahydride is the theoretical nitrogen pentafluoride. Its structure is assumed to be tetrafluoroammonium fluoride (NF_{4}^{+}F^{−}). Similarly to nitrogen pentahydride, it is a compound of nitrogen and five of the same atom, but nitrogen pentafluoride is also a hypothetical compound, still never synthesized and only theoretical research exist. Other pnictogen pentahydrides are theoretically more stable, such as phosphorus pentahydride (PH_{4}H) which is more stable than nitrogen pentahydride but still unstable to decomposition to phosphine and hydrogen gas. Its organic derivatives (phosphoranes) are more stable, such as stable pentaphenylphosphorus (Ph_{5}P). Other heavier pnictogen pentahydrides are more likely to exist, such as the theoretical arsenic pentahydride.
