= Alkali hydroxide =

The alkali hydroxides are a class of chemical compounds which are composed of an alkali metal cation and the hydroxide anion (OH^{−}). The alkali hydroxides are:

- Lithium hydroxide (LiOH)
- Sodium hydroxide (NaOH)
- Potassium hydroxide (KOH)
- Rubidium hydroxide (RbOH)
- Caesium hydroxide (CsOH)
- Francium hydroxide (FrOH)

== Production ==
Alkali hydroxides are formed in the reaction between alkali metals and water. A typical school demonstration demonstrates what happens when a piece of an alkali metal is introduced to a bowl of water. A vigorous reaction occurs, producing hydrogen gas and the specific alkali hydroxide. For example, if sodium is the alkali metal:

2 Na + 2 H_{2}O → 2 NaOH + H_{2}

Sodium hydroxide is an important industrial chemical, where it is produced by the chloralkali process.

== Properties and uses ==
The alkali metal hydroxides form white crystals that are hygroscopic and readily soluble in water, generating large amounts of heat upon dissolution. The solubility increases down the column as the alkali metal ions become larger and the lattice enthalpies decrease.

All alkali metal hydroxides are strong bases, meaning that they dissociate completely in solution to give OH^{−} ions. As strong bases, alkali hydroxides are highly corrosive and are used in cleaning products. Sodium hydroxide is readily available in most hardware stores in products such as a drain cleaner. Similarly, potassium hydroxide is available as a solution used for cleaning terraces and other areas made out of wood. Both NaOH and KOH are also used in the production of soap and detergents (saponification).

Due to their hygroscopic properties, alkali hydroxides are used as desiccants. They also readily absorb carbon dioxide and are therefore used in carbon dioxide scrubbers.

== See also ==
- Hydroperoxide, a peroxide analog of hydroxide
- Hydrosulfide, a sulfur analog of hydroxide
- Hydroselenide, a selenium analog of hydroxide
- Azanide, a nitrogen analog of hydroxide
- Phosphanide, a phosphorus analog of hydroxide and azanide
- Arsanide, an arsenic analog of hydroxide and azanide
