= NH2 =

NH2 or similar may refer to:

- Azanide (chemical formula NH^{−}_{2})
- Amino radical (chemical formula NH^{•}_{2})
- Nitrenium ion (chemical formula NH^{+}_{2})
- Imide ion (chemical formula NH^{2−})
- Primary amide group (chemical formula -NH_{2})
- National Harbor–Alexandria Line (Route NH2), a WMATA bus line between Alexandria, Virginia and Prince George's County, Maryland
- National Highway 2 (India)
- New Hampshire's 2nd congressional district
