= Metal amides =

Metal amides (systematic name metal azanides) are a class of coordination compounds composed of a metal center with amide ligands of the form NR_{2}^{−}. Amido complexes of the parent amido ligand NH_{2}^{−} are rare compared to complexes with diorganylamido ligand, such as dimethylamido. Amide ligands have two electron pairs available for bonding.

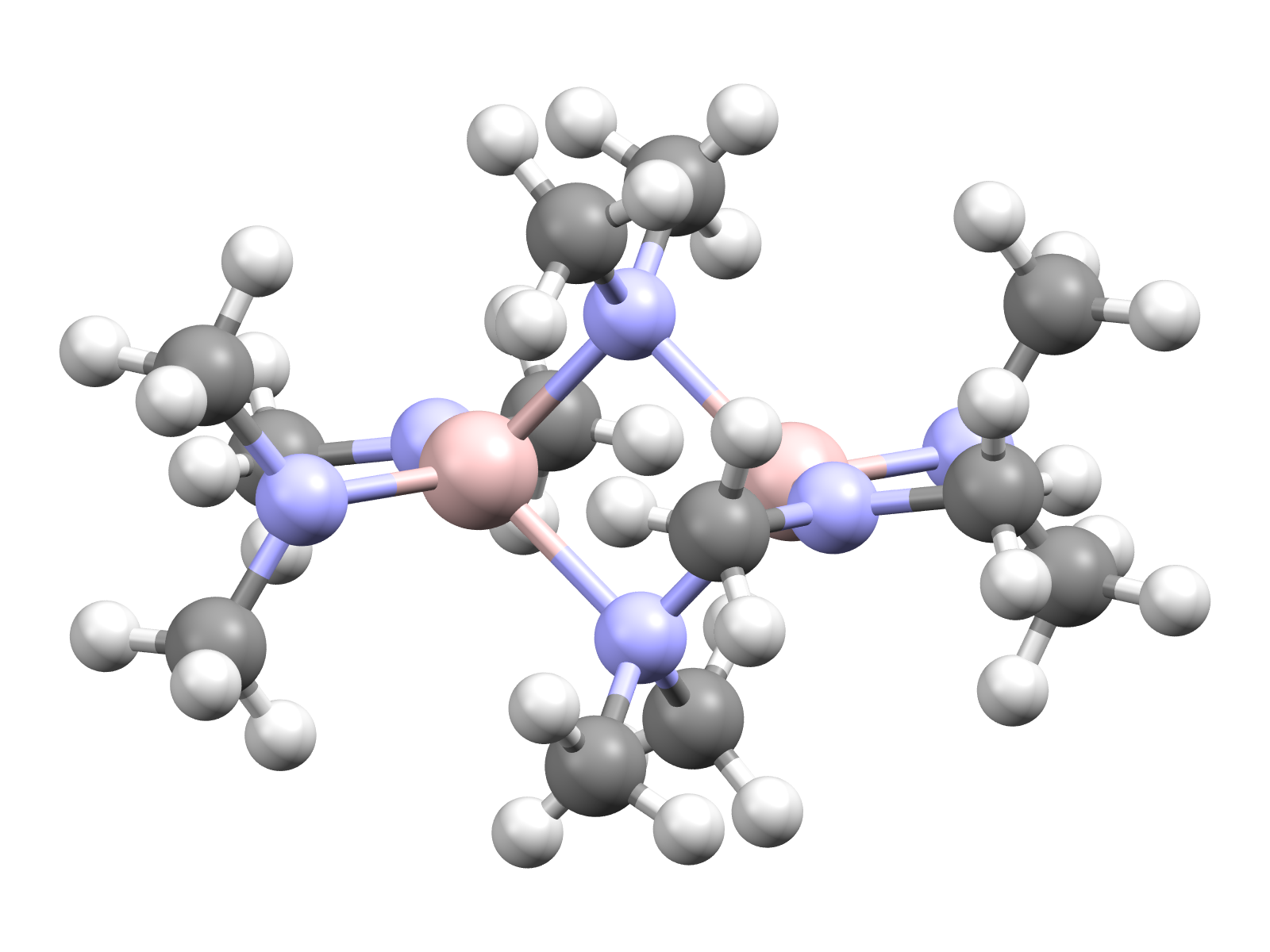
Tris(dimethylamino)aluminium dimer

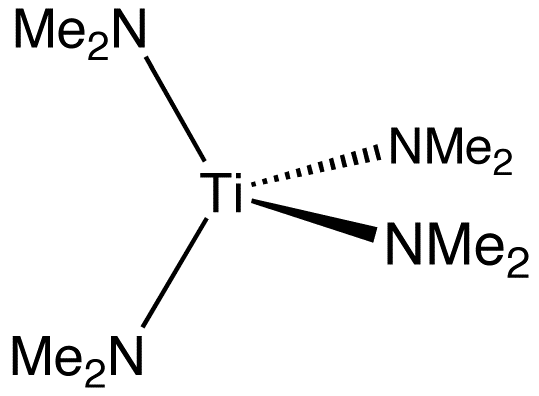
Tetrakis(dimethylamino)titanium

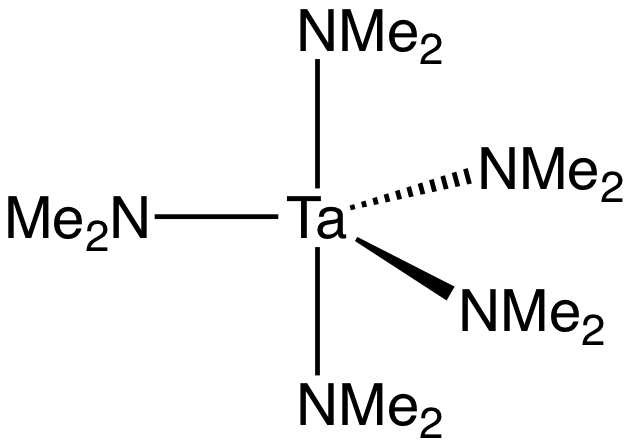
Pentakis(dimethylamido)tantalum

== Geometry and structure ==
In principle, the M-NX_{2} group could be pyramidal or planar. The pyramidal geometry is not observed.

In many complexes, the amido is a bridging ligand. Some examples have both bridging and terminal amido ligands. Bulky amide ligands have a lesser tendency to bridge. Amide ligands may participate in metal-ligand π-bonding giving a complex with the metal center being co-planar with the nitrogen and substituents. Metal bis(trimethylsilyl)amides form a significant subcategory of metal amide compounds. These compounds tend to be discrete and soluble in organic solvents.

== Alkali metal amides ==
Lithium amides are the most important amides. They are prepared from n-butyllithium and the appropriate amine

R_{2}NH + BuLi → R_{2}NLi + BuH

The lithium amides are more common and more soluble than the other alkali metal analogs. Potassium amides are prepared by transmetallation of lithium amides with potassium t-butoxide (see also Schlosser base) or by reaction of the amine with potassium, potassium hydride, n-butylpotassium, or benzylpotassium.

The alkali metal amides, MNH_{2} (M = Li, Na, K) are commercially available. Sodium amide (also known as sodamide) is synthesized from sodium metal and ammonia with ferric nitrate catalyst. The sodium compound is white, but the presence of metallic iron turns the commercial material gray.

2 Na + 2 NH_{3} → 2 NaNH_{2} + H_{2}

Lithium diisopropylamide is a popular non-nucleophilic base used in organic synthesis. Unlike many other bases, the steric bulk prevents this base from acting as a nucleophile. It is commercially available, usually as a solution in hexane. It may be readily prepared from n-butyllithium and diisopropylamine.

== Main group amido complexes ==
Amido derivatives of main group elements are well developed.

== Transition metal complexes ==
Early transition metal amides may be prepared by treating anhydrous metal chloride with alkali amide reagents. In some cases, two equivalents of a secondary amine can be used, one equivalent serving as a base:

MCl_{n} + n LiNR_{2} → M(NR_{2})_{n} + n LiCl
MCl_{n} + 2n HNR_{2} → M(NR_{2})_{n} + n HNR_{2}·HCl

Transition metal amide complexes have been prepared by these methods:

- treating a halide complex with an alkali amide
- deprotonation of a coordinated amine
- oxidative addition of an amine

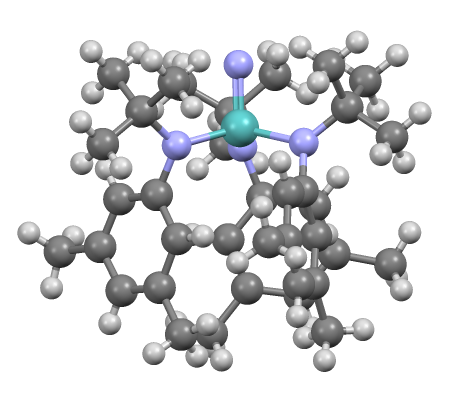
Structure of the nitride-amido complex NMo(N(t-Bu)(C_{6}H_{3}Me_{2})_{3}.

=== Amido-ammine complexes ===
Highly cationic metal ammine complexes such as [Pt(NH3)6]4+ spontaneously convert to the amido derivative:

[Pt(NH_{3})_{6}]^{4+} ↔ [Pt(NH_{3})_{5}(NH_{2})]^{3+} + H^{+}

Transition metal amides are intermediates in the base-induced substitution of transition metal ammine complexes. Thus, the Sn1CB mechanism for the displacement of chloride from chloropentamminecobalt chloride by hydroxide proceeds via an amido intermediate:

[Co(NH_{3})_{5}Cl]^{2+} + OH^{−} → [Co(NH_{3})_{4}(NH_{2})]^{2+} + H_{2}O + Cl^{−}
[Co(NH_{3})_{4}NH_{2}]^{2+} + H_{2}O → [Co(NH_{3})_{5}OH]^{2+}

== See also ==
- Inorganic imide
