= Tris(dimethylamino)gallium dimer =

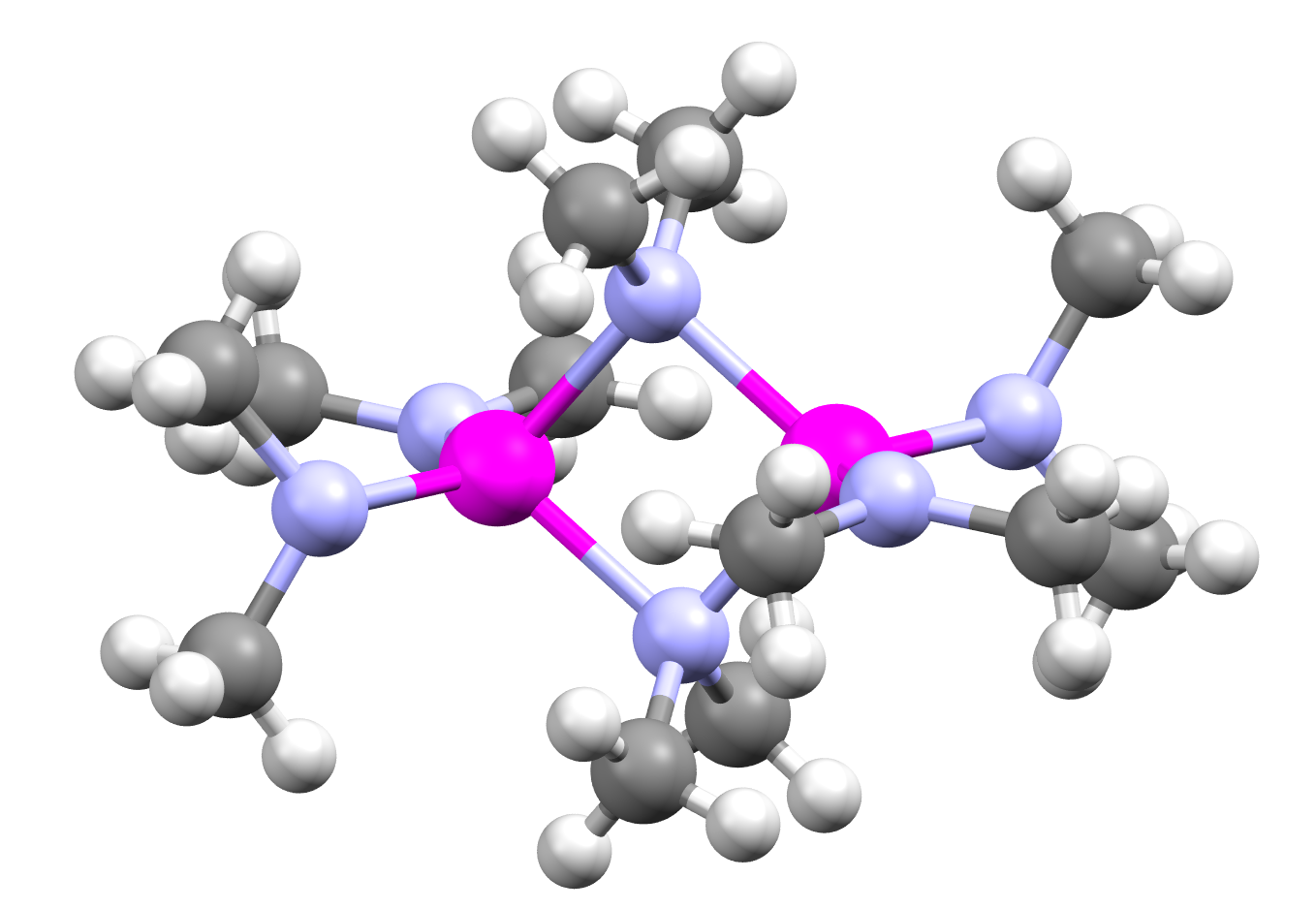

Identifiers
CAS Number	180335-73-3
3D model (JSmol)	Interactive image; monomer:: Interactive image
ChemSpider	monomer:: 22199411
PubChem CID	71311172; monomer:: 3605360
CompTox Dashboard (EPA)	DTXSID301045848
- InChI: InChI=1S/6C2H6N.2Ga/c6*1-3-2;;/h6*1-2H3;;/q6*-1;+1;+3 Key: QGGYSNWTFZVHCR-UHFFFAOYSA-N; monomer:: InChI=1S/3C2H6N.Ga/c3*1-3-2;/h3*1-2H3;/q3*-1;+3 Key: ZRXBTFLOBMVHAY-UHFFFAOYSA-N
- SMILES: CN(C)[Ga-]1(N(C)C)[N+](C)(C)[Ga-]([N+]1(C)C)(N(C)C)N(C)C; monomer:: CN(C)[Ga](N(C)C)N(C)C

Properties
Chemical formula	C_{12}H_{36}Ga_{2}N_{6}
Molar mass	403.908 g·mol^{−1}
Appearance	White or colorless solid

Hazards
- GHS labelling
Pictograms	(GHS02: Flammable) (GHS05: Corrosive)
Signal word	Danger
Hazard statements	H228, H314
Precautionary statements	P210, P240, P241, P260, P264, P280, P301+P330+P331, P303+P361+P353, P304+P340, P305+P351+P338, P310, P321, P363, P370+P378, P405, P501
- Except where otherwise noted, data are given for materials in their standard state (at 25 °C [77 °F], 100 kPa). verify (what is ?) Infobox references

Tris(dimethylamino)gallium dimer, formally bis(μ-dimethylamino)tetrakis(dimethylamino)digallium, is an amide complex of gallium. This compound may be used as a precursor to other gallium complexes.

Commercially available, this compound may be prepared from lithium dimethylamide and gallium trichloride.
