= Trimesityliridium =

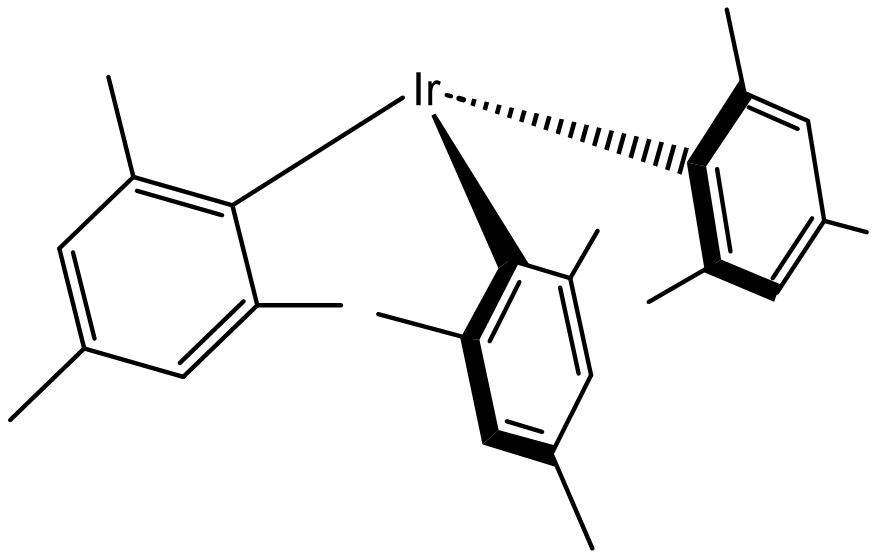

Identifiers
3D model (JSmol)	Interactive image
ChemSpider	28688627
PubChem CID	71346054
- InChI: InChI=1S/3C9H11.Ir/c3*1-7-4-8(2)6-9(3)5-7;/h3*4-5H,1-3H3; Key: XSLKHNGJGNSHMC-UHFFFAOYSA-N
- SMILES: CC(C=C(C)C1)=C(C=1C)[Ir](C(C(C)=CC1C)=C(C=1)C)C(C(C)=CC1C)=C(C=1)C

Properties
Chemical formula	C_{27}H_{33}Ir
Molar mass	549.77
Appearance	red-brown crystalline solid
- Except where otherwise noted, data are given for materials in their standard state (at 25 °C [77 °F], 100 kPa). Infobox references

Trimesityliridium is a pyramidal iridium(III) complex that crystallizes as a red-brown solid with the formula Ir(C_{9}H_{11})_{3}. It is most often used as an oxygen atom transfer catalyst in concert with oxotrimesityliridium, the product it forms readily when exposed to O_{2}.

== Properties ==
Trimesityliridium(III) crystallizes as a red-brown solid soluble in hexane, toluene, and hexamethyldisiloxane. It is very air sensitive and decomposes at room temperature.

== Synthesis ==
The synthesis of trimesityliridium(III) was first reported in 1992 following a procedure described in the corresponding paper as mimicking that of the previously prepared organometallic rhodium analog Rh(mes)_{3}. The rhodium analog had been synthesized as a result of a prior collaboration between the same research groups responsible for this iridium complex, the labs of Michael Hursthouse and Geoffrey Wilkinson. Trimesityliridium(III) was first synthesized via the reaction of the Grignard reagent mesitylmagnesium bromide (MesMgBr) with IrCl_{3}(tht), where tht = tetrahydrothiophene, in diethyl ether.

== Reactivity ==
As an air sensitive compound, trimesityliridium(III) reacts readily with O_{2} at room temperature to form oxotrimesityliridium(V) via a reaction pathway that is second-order with respect to iridium. The kinetics of this reaction can be monitored spectrophotometrically and yield a rate law of rate=k[Ir(III)]^{2}[O_{2}]), which supports the mechanism proposed by Hay-Motherwell and Wilkinson in 1993, in which a dioxygen complexes to the metal center in trimesityliridium before a second equivalent of the iridium species reduces this species to yield two oxotrimesityliridium equivalents.

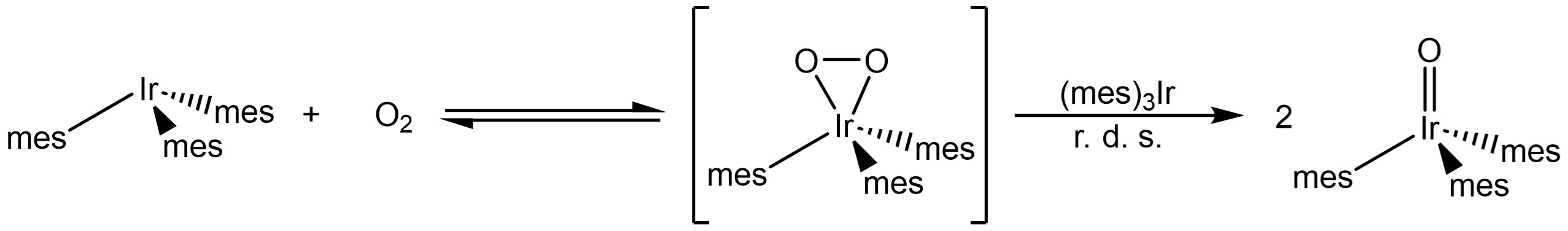
The mechanism of the synthesis of oxotrimesityliridium(V) from trimesityliridium(III) as proposed by Hay-Motherwell and Wilkinson in 1993.

Under standard conditions, these two iridium complexes undergo rapid intermetal oxygen atom transfer (OAT), demonstrating just one of its productive reactivities with oxygen. A rate constant of this reaction of 5 × 10^{7} M^{−1} s^{−1} has been extrapolated from variable temperature NMR studies of the product of the two iridium species’ conproportionation, which occurs at low temperatures, yielding (mes)_{3}Ir—O—Ir(mes)_{3}. This degenerate intermetal oxygen atom transfer occurs about twelve orders of magnitude faster than does the osmium analog, leading Seth Brown et al. to conclude in 2007 that the pyramidal nature of both Ir(III) and Ir(V) is responsible for the unique ability of (mes)_{3}IrO to partake in intermetal OAT without placing any electrons in an antibonding orbital. The authors reach such a conclusion by comparing (mes)_{3}Ir with Os(NAr)_{3}, another three-coordinate late-transition metal complex. To form the dimeric intermediate of the intermetal OAT, both complexes must assume a pyramidal configuration, which in the case of the iridium species is already occupied, whereas the osmium complex must distort from its planar configuration and place a pair of electrons in an antibonding orbital to allow such reactivity. Trimesityliridium has a HOMO of a_{1} symmetry, consistent with the symmetry of the LUMO of oxotrimesityliridium, giving rise to the orbitally allowed linear approach of the latter for rapid intermetal OAT. Brown et al. thus indicate that (mes)_{3}IrO is well-suited to activating dioxygen in co-catalyzed oxidations.

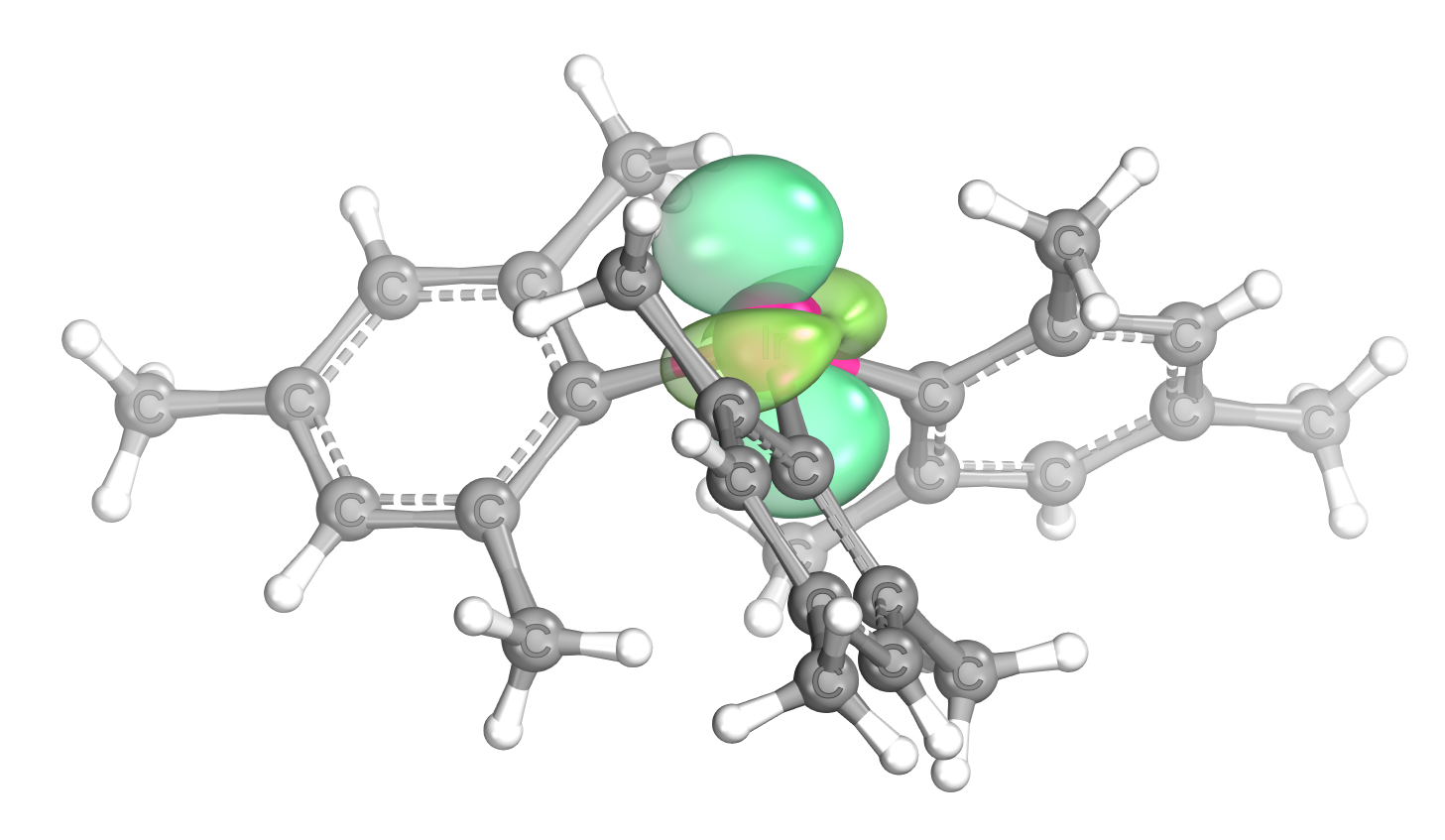
The HOMO of (mes)3Ir of a1 symmetry, which enables the linear approach of (mes)3IrO, whose LUMO shares the same symmetry, for rapid oxygen atom transfer.

These conclusions have been supported by DFT calculations from Sakaki et al., which were used to decompose the activation energies of the iridium system and the corresponding osmium system into nuclear and electronic factors, where nuclear factors refer to the energy necessary to distort the ML_{3} and ML_{3}═O moieties to their transition state geometries. The nuclear factor in the osmium system is enough larger than that of the iridium system as to account for about 70% of the difference in their activation energies.

Co-catalyzed oxidations as described by Brown et al. can even be performed between trimesityliridium(III) and the product of its reaction with O_{2}, oxotrimesityliridium(V). For instance, they can be combined with triphenylphosphine under standard temperature and pressure to facilitate OAT to triphenylphosphine with relatively high activity.

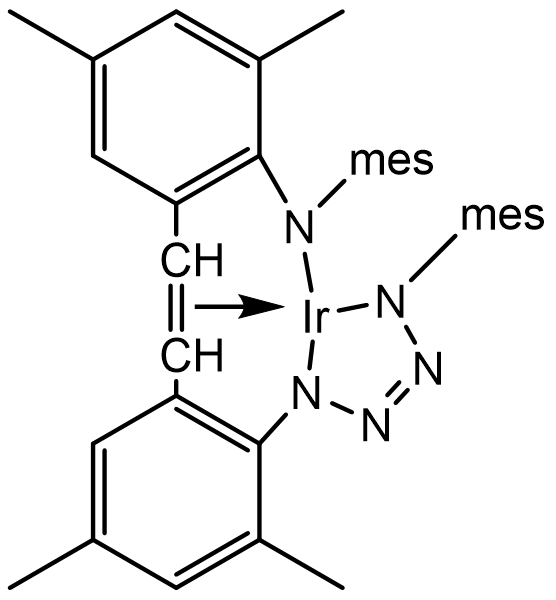
The iridium(III) amido complex resulting from the reaction of Ir(mes)3 with N3(mes).

Despite its reactivity with similar substrates, kinetic factors prevent oxotrimesityliridium from reacting with sulfides, sulfoxides, alcohols, or alkenes. On the other hand, trimesityliridium can react with organic azides to form a variety of products of several different geometries, including pseudo-square planar, trigonal bipyramidal, and octahedral, depending on the nature of the reactant azide. One such product of a reaction with an organic azide is a unique pseudo-square planar iridium(III) complex with a tetradentate ligand composed of three π-donating amido interactions and one π-accepting olefin. This species is a rare iridium(III) amido complex.

Trimesityliridium's reactivity with organic azides has been probed in the interest of studying late transition metal imido complexes given their potential reactivity toward various small organic molecules.
