= Transition metal phosphido complexes =

A transition metal phosphido complex is a coordination complex containing a phosphido ligand (R_{2}P, where R = H, organic substituent). With two lone pairs on phosphorus, the phosphido anion (R_{2}P^{−}) is comparable to an amido anion (R_{2}N^{−}), except that the M-P distances are longer and the phosphorus atom is more sterically accessible. For these reasons, phosphido is often a bridging ligand. The -PH_{2} ion or ligand is also called phosphanide or phosphido ligand.

== Synthesis ==
One can generate transition-metal phosphido complexes by direct activation of P-H bonds, as mostly seen in the late-transition-metal complexes. For example, the reaction of Vaska's complex analogs with the parent phosphine generate the following transition-metal phosphido complex.

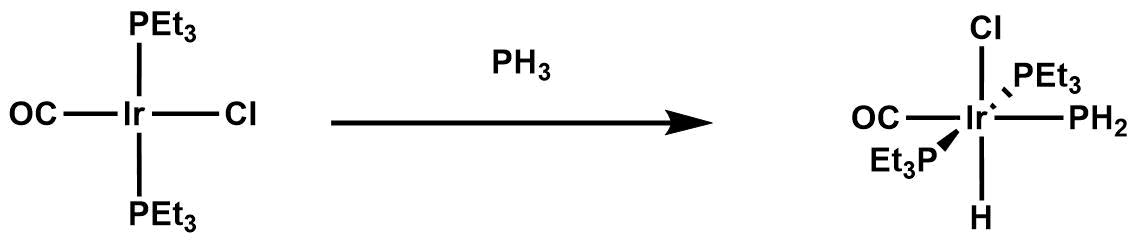
Synthesis of phosphido complex by oxidative addition of a P-H bond (Et = [[[ethyl

Alkali metal phosphides sometimes reduce the metal center.

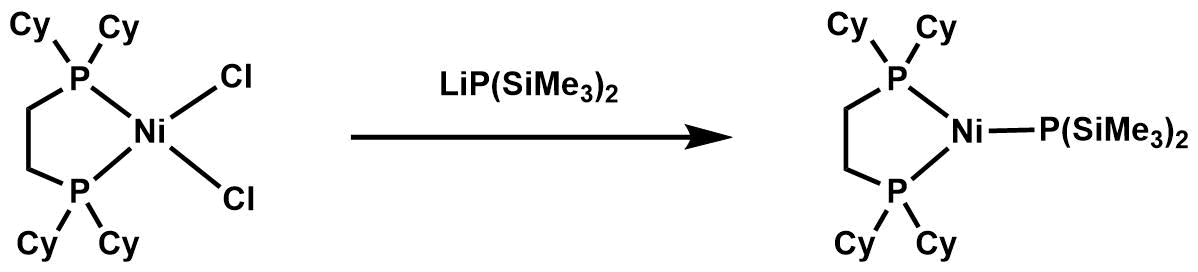
Synthesis of a bis(phosphido) complex by salt metathesis concomitant with reduction at the metal (Cy = cyclohexyl

The alternative salt metathesis route involves the reaction of alkali metal diorganophosphides with metal halides. A typical phosphide reagent is lithium diphenylphosphide.

== Structure ==
Structure of the Mo_{2}P_{4}C_{8} core of Mo_{2}[P(tert-Bu)_{2}]_{4}.

Most complexes of the phosphide ligand can be classified into one of three structural classes:

- those where the phosphide is a terminal ligand and phosphorus is pyramidal,
- those where the phosphide is a terminal ligand and phosphorus is planar,
- those where the phosphide is a bridging ligand and phosphorus is tetrahedral.

=== Pyramidal terminal phosphido ligands ===
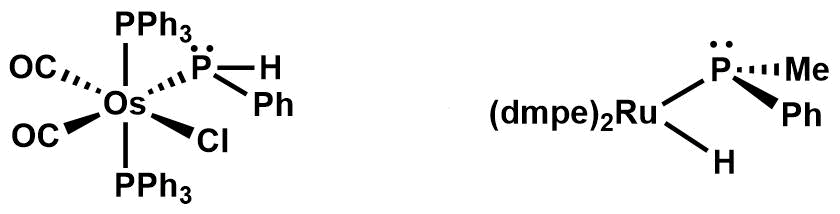
Illustrative complexes of "pyramidal phosphido ligands".

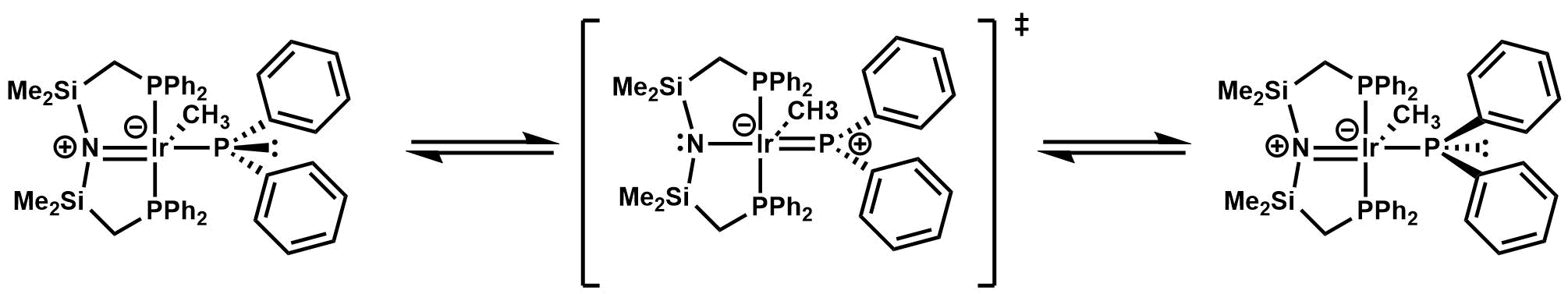
examples of the inversion of configuration at phosphorus in phosphido complex

In most complexes with terminal phosphido ligands, phosphorus is pyramidal, as expected with a stereochemically active lone pair of electrons. The M-P bond length in the pyramidal phosphide complex is longer than the M-P bond length in corresponding transition metal phosphine complexes. The pyramidal phosphido complex. In the complex, the Os-PHPh bond is 0.11 Å longer than the Os-PPh_{3} and the Os-P-C angle is 113^{o}. The elongated Os-PHPh bond is often attributed to the electronic repulsion of the lone pair and nonbonding electrons on Os. Also, in another ruthenium complex, the Ru-P(Me)Ph bond is 0.17 Å longer than Ru-PH(Me)Ph in the related phosphine ligand version of the complex, [(dmpe)_{2}Ru(H)PH(Me)Ph]^{+}. Additionally electronic repulsion of the P-centered lone pair and metal-based electrons enhance the nucleophilicity of the phosphide ligand. This high basicity and high nucleophilicity leads to the dimerization reaction.

The inversion of configuration at pyramidal terminal phosphides has been observed by ^{31}P NMR spectroscopy.

=== Planar terminal phosphido ligands ===
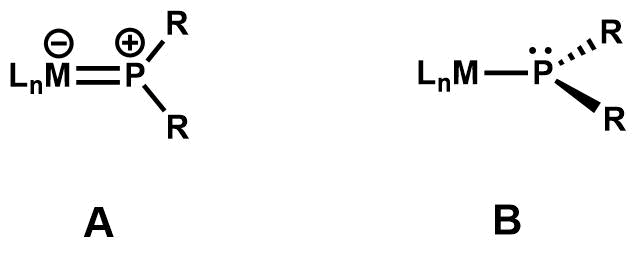
Resonance structures for complexes of planar phosphido ligands

Planar terminal phosphido ligands are also known. Terminal planar phosphido ligands engage in M-P multiple bonding. Planar phosphido complexes usually have shorter M-P bonds and wider M-P-R angles. In the tungsten complex, the W-PHPh bond is 0.26 Å shorter than W-PEt_{3} bond in the same complex, and the W-P-C angle is 140°. In (C_{5}H_{5})_{2}Hf(PR_{2})_{2}, which can be prepared by salt metathesis from hafnocene dichloride, Hf(IV) is bonded to both planar and pyramidal phosphido ligands. These ligand types interconvert on the NMR timescale corresponding to an activation energy of about 8 kcal/mol. According to X-ray crystallography, the Hf-P distances are 2.488 (planar P) and 2.682 Å (pyramidal P).

=== Bridging phosphido ligands ===
Structure of Fe_{2}(μ-PPh_{2})_{2}(CO)_{6}.

In most of its complexes, the phosphido ligand is a bridging ligand. No lone pairs remain on phosphorus. These complexes have the formula [M(μ-PR_{2})L_{n}]_{2}. One example is [Fe(μ-PPh_{2})(CO)_{3}]_{2}. Phosphido ligands are often installed by salt metathesis reactions. Sources of R_{2}P^{+} and R_{2}P^{−} are provided by phosphorus halides and alkali metal phosphides respectively. Illustrative of the use of R_{2}PCl-like reagents is the synthesis of a diiron diphosphide:

Na_{2}Fe_{2}(CO)_{8} + 2 Ph_{2}PCl → Fe_{2}(PPh_{2})_{2}(CO)_{6} + 2 NaCl + 2 CO

== Role in catalysis ==
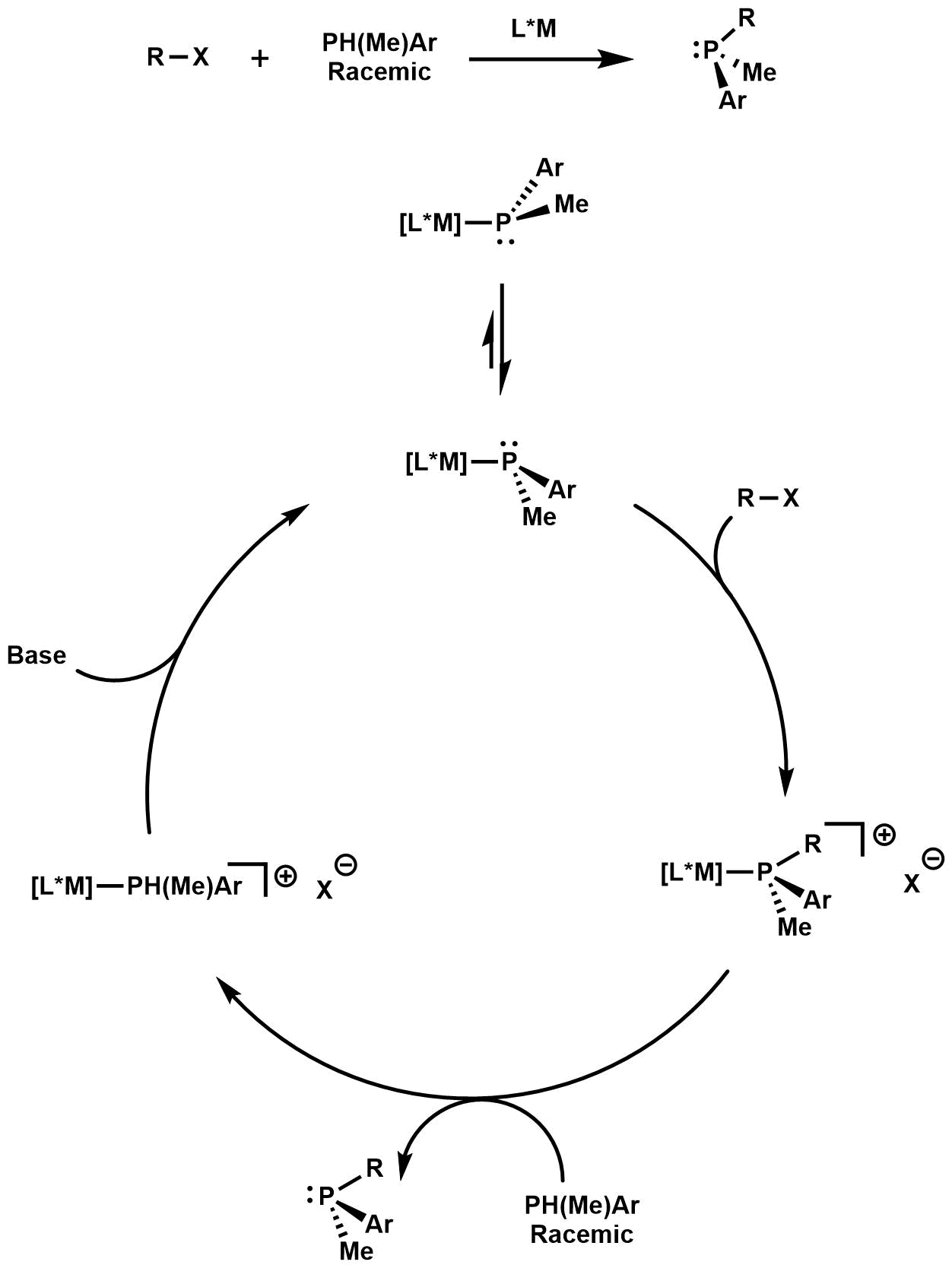
Cycle for enantioselective synthesis of tertiary phosphines by using phosphido complex intermediate

Metal phosphido complexes are intermediates the catalytic hydrophosphinations, which is a route to organophosphorus compound. Although this methodology has not proven to be of practical value, it offers the potential for producing specialized phosphine ligands. In one case, a Pt(0) catalyst undergoes oxidative addition of a secondary phosphine to form the corresponding Pt(II) phosphido complex, which react with electrophilic alkenes such as acrylonitrile. This P-C bond forming step proceeds through an outer-sphere, Michael-type addition. cAlkene insertion into the metal-hydrogen bond is also invoked in some hydrophosphinations.

Metal phosphides have been used in the synthesis of P-stereogenic phosphines by exploiting the high nucleophilicity in the pyramidal phosphide complex.
