= Pentakis(dimethylamido)tantalum =

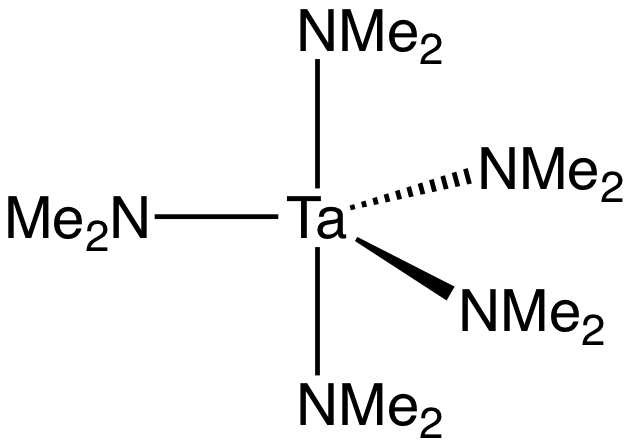

Names
- IUPAC name Tantalum(V) dimethylazanide
- Other names Pentakis(dimethylamino)tantalum(V), Tantalum dimethylamide

Identifiers
CAS Number	19824-59-0
3D model (JSmol)	Interactive image
ChemSpider	124019
PubChem CID	140614
UNII	LHA9MPV7ZX
- InChI: InChI=1S/5C2H6N.Ta/c5*1-3-2;/h5*1-2H3;/q5*-1;+5 Key: VSLPMIMVDUOYFW-UHFFFAOYSA-N
- SMILES: C[N-]C.C[N-]C.C[N-]C.C[N-]C.C[N-]C.[Ta+5]

Properties
Chemical formula	C_{10}H_{30}N_{5}Ta
Molar mass	401.333 g·mol^{−1}
Appearance	orange powder (xtl)
Melting point	100 °C

Hazards
- GHS labelling
Pictograms	(GHS02: Flammable) (GHS05: Corrosive)
- Except where otherwise noted, data are given for materials in their standard state (at 25 °C [77 °F], 100 kPa). Infobox references

Pentakis(dimethylamido)tantalum is an organometallic compound of tantalum. It is a colorless solid that is soluble in organic solvents. It hydrolyzes readily to release dimethylamine.

== Synthesis and structure ==
Ta(NMe_{2})_{5} is prepared by treating TaCl_{5} with lithium dimethylamide. The preparation is similar to that for tetrakis(dimethylamido)titanium.

The compound has idealized D_{3h} symmetry (ignoring the organic substituents).

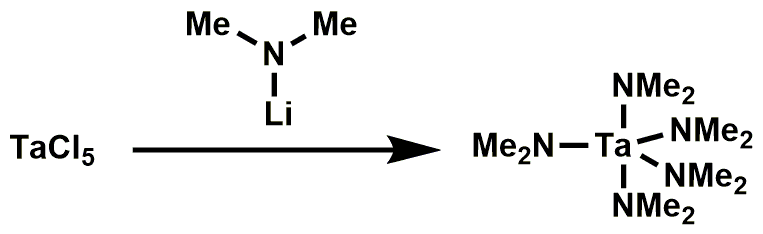

== Applications to organic synthesis ==
The complex effects C-alkylation of secondary amines with 1-alkenes and hydroaminoalkylation of olefins to form alkylamines.

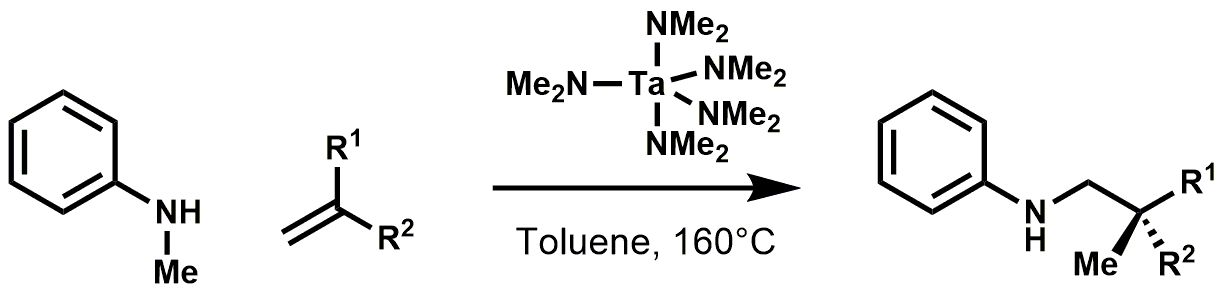
Hydroaminoalkylation Reaction Scheme
