= Sodium amide =

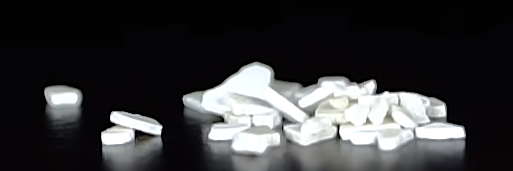

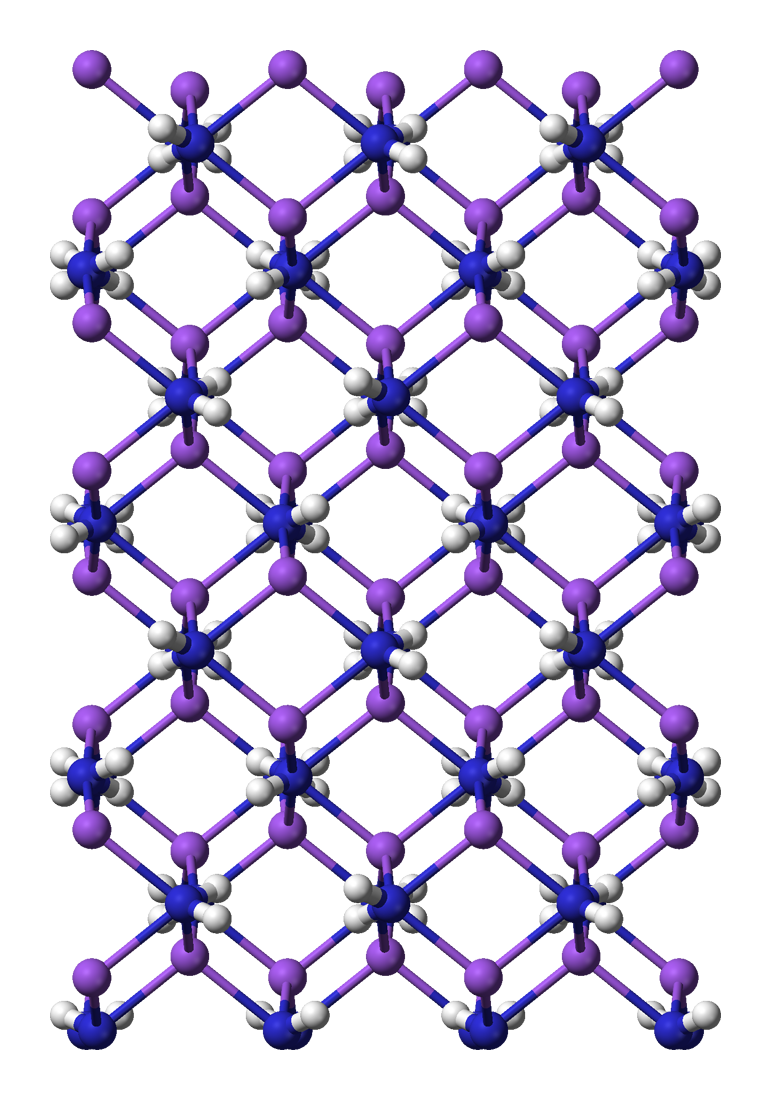
- Ball and stick, unit cell model of sodium amide

Names
- IUPAC name: Sodium amide; Sodium azanide
- Other names Sodamide

Identifiers
CAS Number	7782-92-5
3D model (JSmol)	Interactive image; Interactive image
ChEBI	CHEBI:176791
ChemSpider	22940
ECHA InfoCard	100.029.064
EC Number	231-971-0
PubChem CID	24533
UNII	5DB3G6PX9D
UN number	1390
CompTox Dashboard (EPA)	DTXSID2064816
- InChI: InChI=1S/H2N.Na/h1H2;/q-1;+1 Key: ODZPKZBBUMBTMG-UHFFFAOYSA-N
- SMILES: [Na]N; [NH2-].[Na+]

Properties
Chemical formula	NaNH_{2}
Molar mass	39.013 g·mol^{−1}
Appearance	Colourless crystals
Odor	Ammonia-like
Density	1.39 g/cm^{3}
Melting point	210 °C (410 °F; 483 K)
Boiling point	400 °C (752 °F; 673 K)
Solubility in water	Reacts
Solubility in liquid ammonia	40 mg/L
Acidity (pK_{a})	38 (conjugate acid)

Structure
Crystal structure	orthorhombic

Thermochemistry
Heat capacity (C)	66.15 J/(mol·K)
Std molar entropy (S^{⦵}_{298})	76.9 J/(mol·K)
Std enthalpy of formation (Δ_{f}H^{⦵}_{298})	−118.8 kJ/mol
Gibbs free energy (Δ_{f}G^{⦵})	−59 kJ/mol

Hazards
- GHS labelling
Pictograms	(GHS02: Flammable) (GHS05: Corrosive)
Signal word	Danger
Hazard statements	H261, H314, H412
Precautionary statements	P223, P231+P232, P260, P264, P273, P280, P301+P330+P331, P303+P361+P353, P304+P340+P310, P305+P351+P338+P310, P335+P334, P363, P370+P378, P402+P404, P405, P501
NFPA 704 (fire diamond)	3 3 2 W
Autoignition temperature	450 °C (842 °F; 723 K)

Related compounds
Other anions	Sodium bis(trimethylsilyl)amide
Other cations	Lithium amide; Potassium amide
Related compounds	Ammonia
- Except where otherwise noted, data are given for materials in their standard state (at 25 °C [77 °F], 100 kPa). verify (what is ?) Infobox references

Sodium amide, commonly called sodamide (systematic name sodium azanide), is the inorganic compound with the formula NaNH_{2}. It is a salt composed of the sodium cation and the azanide anion. It is a white solid which is dangerously reactive toward water, but commercial samples are typically gray due to the presence of small quantities of metallic iron from the manufacturing process. Such impurities do not usually affect the utility of the reagent. NaNH_{2} conducts electricity in the fused state, its conductance being similar to that of NaOH in a similar state. NaNH_{2} has been widely employed as a strong base in organic synthesis.

== Preparation and structure ==
Sodium amide can be prepared by the reaction of sodium with ammonia gas, but it is usually prepared by the reaction in liquid ammonia using iron(III) nitrate as a catalyst. The reaction is fastest at the boiling point of the ammonia (−33 °C (−27 °F; 240 K)). An electride, [Na(NH_{3})_{6}]^{+}e^{−}, is formed as a reaction intermediate.

2 Na + 2 NH_{3} → 2 NaNH_{2} + H_{2}

NaNH_{2} is a salt-like material and as such, crystallizes as an infinite polymer. The geometry about sodium is tetrahedral. In ammonia, NaNH_{2} forms conductive solutions, consistent with the presence of [Na(NH_{3})_{6}]^{+} and NH^{−}_{2} ions.

== Uses ==
Sodium amide is mainly used as a strong base in organic chemistry, often suspended (it is insoluble) in liquid ammonia solution. One of the main advantages to the use of sodium amide is its relatively low nucleophilicity. In the industrial production of indigo, sodium amide is a component of the highly basic mixture that induces cyclisation of N-phenylglycine. The reaction produces ammonia, which is typically recycled.

Pfleger's synthesis of indigo dye.

=== Dehydrohalogenation ===
Sodium amide is a standard base for dehydrohalogenations. It induces the loss of two equivalents of hydrogen bromide from a vicinal dibromoalkane to give a carbon–carbon triple bond, as in a preparation of phenylacetylene. Usually two equivalents of sodium amide yields the desired alkyne. Three equivalents are necessary in the preparation of a terminal alkynes because the terminal CH of the resulting alkyne protonates an equivalent amount of base.

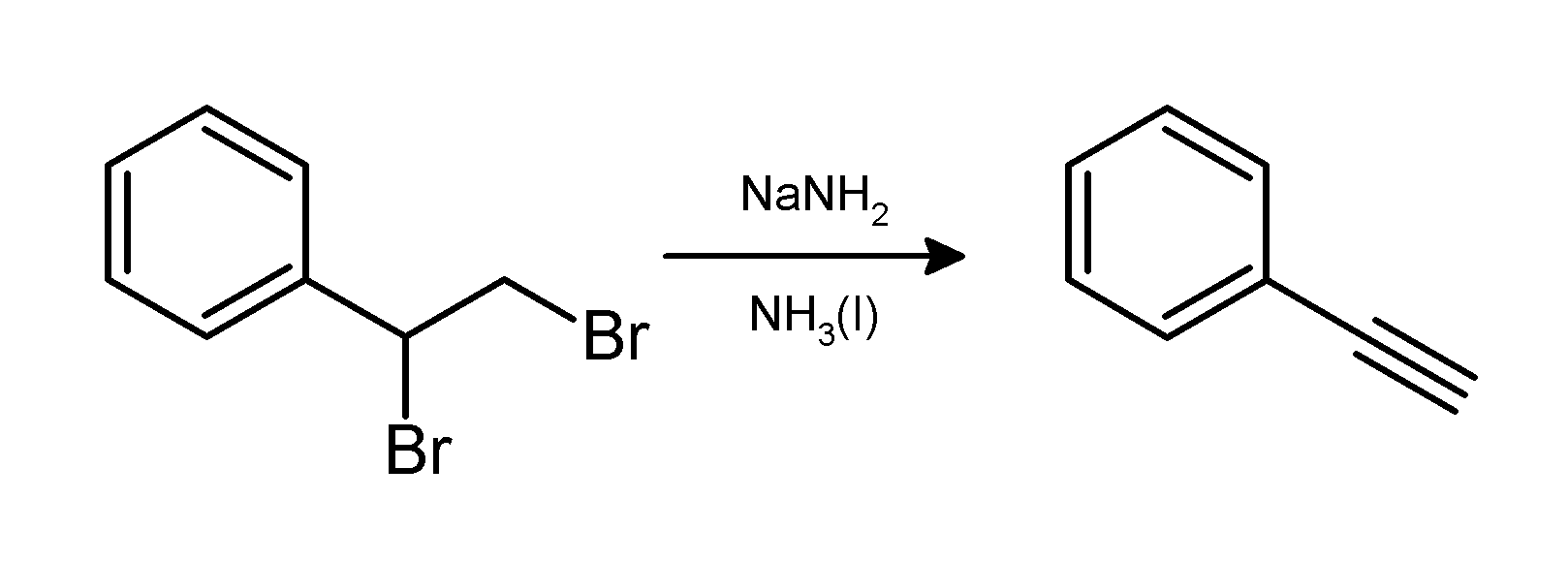

Hydrogen chloride and ethanol can also be eliminated in this way, as in the preparation of 1-ethoxy-1-butyne.

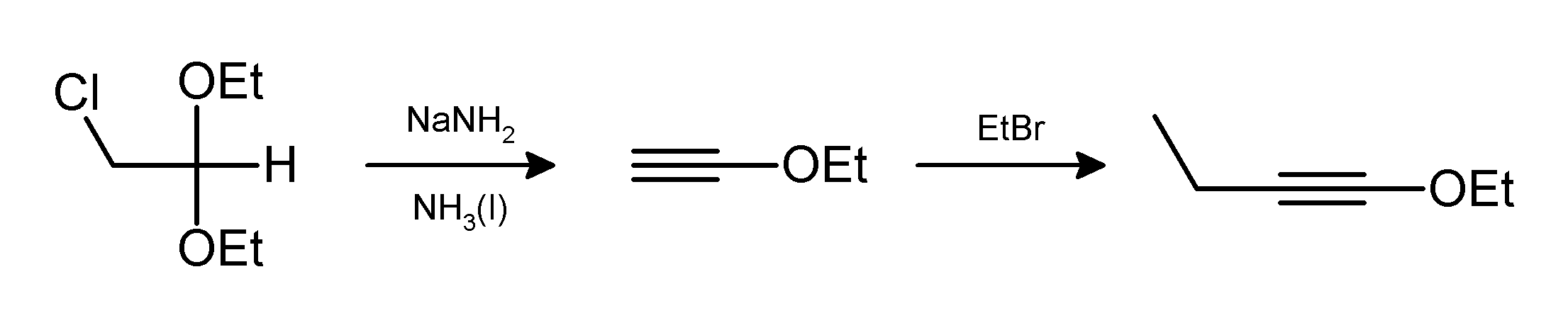

=== Cyclization reactions ===
Where there is no β-hydrogen to be eliminated, cyclic compounds may be formed, as in the preparation of methylenecyclopropane below.

Cyclopropenes, aziridines and cyclobutanes may be formed in a similar manner.

=== Deprotonation of carbon and nitrogen acids ===
Carbon acids which can be deprotonated by sodium amide in liquid ammonia include:

- Terminal alkynes
- Methyl ketones
- Cyclohexanone
- Phenylacetic acid and its derivatives
- Diphenylmethane.

Acetylacetone loses two protons to form a dianion. Sodium amide will also deprotonate indole and piperidine.

=== Related non-nucleophilic bases ===
It is however poorly soluble in solvents other than ammonia. Its use has been superseded by the related reagents sodium hydride, sodium bis(trimethylsilyl)amide (NaHMDS), and lithium diisopropylamide (LDA).

=== Other reactions ===
- Rearrangement with orthodeprotonation
- Oxirane synthesis
- Indole synthesis
- Chichibabin reaction

== Safety ==
Sodium amide is a common reagent with a long history of laboratory use. It reacts violently on contact with water, producing ammonia and sodium hydroxide:

NaNH_{2} + H_{2}O → NH_{3} + NaOH

When burned in oxygen, it will give oxides of sodium (which react with the produced water, giving sodium hydroxide) along with nitrogen oxides:

4 NaNH_{2} + 5 O_{2} → 4 NaOH + 4 NO + 2 H_{2}O
4 NaNH_{2} + 7 O_{2} → 4 NaOH + 4 NO_{2} + 2 H_{2}O

In the presence of limited quantities of air and moisture, such as in a poorly closed container, explosive mixtures of peroxides may form. This is accompanied by a yellowing or browning of the solid. As such, sodium amide is to be stored in a tightly closed container, under an atmosphere of an inert gas. Sodium amide samples which are yellow or brown in color represent explosion risks.
