= Hydridonitride =

Chemical compounds containing H+ and N– ions in a single phase

In chemistry, a hydridonitride (nitridohydride, nitride hydride, or hydride nitride) is a chemical compound that contains both hydride (H^{−}) and nitride (N^{3−}) ions. These inorganic compounds are distinct from inorganic amides and imides as the hydrogen does not share a bond with nitrogen, and usually contain a larger proportion of metals.

== Structure ==
The hydride ion H^{−} is stabilised by being surrounded by electropositive elements such as alkalis or alkaline earths. Quaternary compounds exist where nitrogen forms a complex with bonds to a transition or main group element. The hydride requires the presence of another alkaline earth element.

== Production ==
Hydridonitrides may be produced by a process called self-propagating high-temperature synthesis (SHS) where a metal nitride is ignited in a hydrogen atmosphere.

A metal (Ti, Zr, Hf, Y) can also be ignited in an atmosphere mixing hydrogen and nitrogen, and a hydridonitride is formed exothermically.

The molten metal flux technique involves dissolving metal nitrides and hydrides in an excess of molten alkaline earth metal, by heating till everything is molten, and then cooling until crystals form, but the metal is still liquid. Draining the liquid metal (and centrifuging) leaves the crystals of hydridonitride behind. A eutectic molten metal allows it to be cooled more.

If liquid alkali metal is used as a flux to grow a hydridonitride crystal, excess metal can be removed using liquid ammonia.

== Properties ==
Some hydridonitrides are sensitive to water vapour in air. For non-stoichimetric compounds, as the proportion of hydrogen increases, the unit cell dimensions also increase, so hydrogen is not merely filling holes. When heated to a sufficiently high temperature, hydridonitrides lose hydrogen first to form a metallic nitride or alloy.

=== Room temperature superconductor ===
One lutetium hydride doped with nitrogen is claimed to be a room-temperature superconductor at up to 21°C at a pressure of 1 GPa, which is considerably lower than for other polyhydrides. This has been called "red matter" as it is red under high pressure, but blue at ambient conditions. The claim has been met with some skepticism as it was made by the same team that made similar claims retracted by Nature in 2022, claimed observation of solid metallic hydrogen in 2016 as well as other allegations. First attempts to replicate the results have failed. Ashcroft suggested metallic hydrogen could superconduct in 1968 at great pressures and in 2004 similarly that dense group IVa hydrides (as the new material) could also be superconductors at more accessible pressures.

== List ==
name	formula	system	space group	unit cell (lengths in Å, volume in Å^{3})	structure	comment	optical	reference
Lithium nitride hydride Lithium hydridonitride	Li_{4}NH	tetragonal	I4_{1}/a	a = 4.9865, c = 9.877, V = 234.9, Z = 4			yellow	
calcium hydridonitride	Ca_{2}NH	cubic	Fd3m	a = 10.13, Z = 16			brown-black	
tricalcium silicon trinitride hydride	Ca_{3}SiN_{3}H	monoclinic	C2/c	a = 5.236, b = 10.461, c = 16.389, β = 91.182°, Z = 8	SiN_{4} tetrahedra in chains, Ca_{6}H octahedra			
Titanium hydridonitride	TiN_{0.3}H_{1.1}							
	Ti_{0.7}V_{0.3}N_{0.23}H_{0.8}							
	Ca_{3}CrN_{3}H	hexagonal	P6_{3}/m	a= 7.22772 c=5.06172 Z=2 V=228.998				
hexacalcium dichromium hexanitride hydride	Ca_{6}Cr_{2}N_{6}H		R3̅	a = 9.0042, c = 9.1898, Z = 3	planar CrN^{6−}_{3}, CrN^{5−}_{3}, octahedral Ca_{6}H^{11+}			
strontium hydridonitride	Sr_{2}NH		R3̅m	a = 3.870, c = 18.958			orange-yellow or black	
Lithium distrontium dihydride nitride	LiSr_{2}H_{2}N	orthorhombic	Pnma	a = 7.4714, b = 3.7028, c = 13.2986, Z = 4	[SrH_{5}N_{2}]^{9−}, [SrH_{4}N_{3}]^{11−}, [LiH_{3}N]^{5−}			
	Ti_{0.6}Nb_{0.4}N_{0.4}H_{1.1}							
zirconium hydridonitride	ZrN_{0.17}H_{1.65}							
	Ti_{0.88}Zr_{0.12}N_{0.28}H_{1.39}							
	Zr_{0.7}Nb_{0.3}N_{0.33}H_{1.15}							
	ZrCr_{2}N_{0.4}H_{1.4}	hexagonal	P6_{3}/mmc	a = 5.2263, c = 8.5777,		catalytic ammonia synthesis		
barium hydridonitride	Ba_{2}NH	hexagonal	R3̅m	a = 4.0262, c = 20.469		pure H^{−} conductor		
Tribarium chromium trinitride hydride	Ba_{3}CrN_{3}H	hexagonal	P6_{3}/m	a = 8.0270, c = 5.6240, Z = 2 V=313.83	planar CrN^{5−}_{3}, octahedral HBa^{11+}_{6}	nonmagnetic insulator	green	
Lithium dieuropium nitride trihydride	LiEu_{2}NH_{3}	orthorhombic	Pnma	a = 7.4213, b = 3.6726, c = 13.1281, Z = 4	[Eu^{3+}H_{7}N_{2}]^{10−} and [Eu^{2+}H_{6}N_{3}]^{13−}		ruby red	
Lutetium hydride nitride	LuH_{3−x}N_{y}		Fm3̅m			< 1 GPa	blue	
Lutetium hydride nitride	LuH_{3−x}N_{y}		Immm			super conductor at 1 GPa and 21 °C	pink	
Hafnium hydridonitride	HfNH_{0.6}	hcp		a = 3.241, c = 5.198				
Hafnium hydridonitride	HfNH	hcp		a = 3.216, c = 5.259				
Thorium nitride hydride	ThNH_{2}	fcc		a = 5.596				
Lanthanum nitride hydride	La_{2}H_{3–x}N	trigonal	P−3m1	a = 3.86615, c = 6.17859, V = 79.9792	layered anion ordering	hydride-concentration driven metal–semiconductor transition		
Neodymium nitride hydride	Nd_{2}H_{3–x}N	trigonal	P−3m1	a = 3.73439, c = 5.97775, V = 72.1950	layered anion ordering			
Gadolinium nitride hydride	Gd_{2}H_{3–x}N	trigonal	P−3m1	a = 3.62778, c = 5.82556, V = 66.3972	layered anion ordering			
