= Lithium imide =

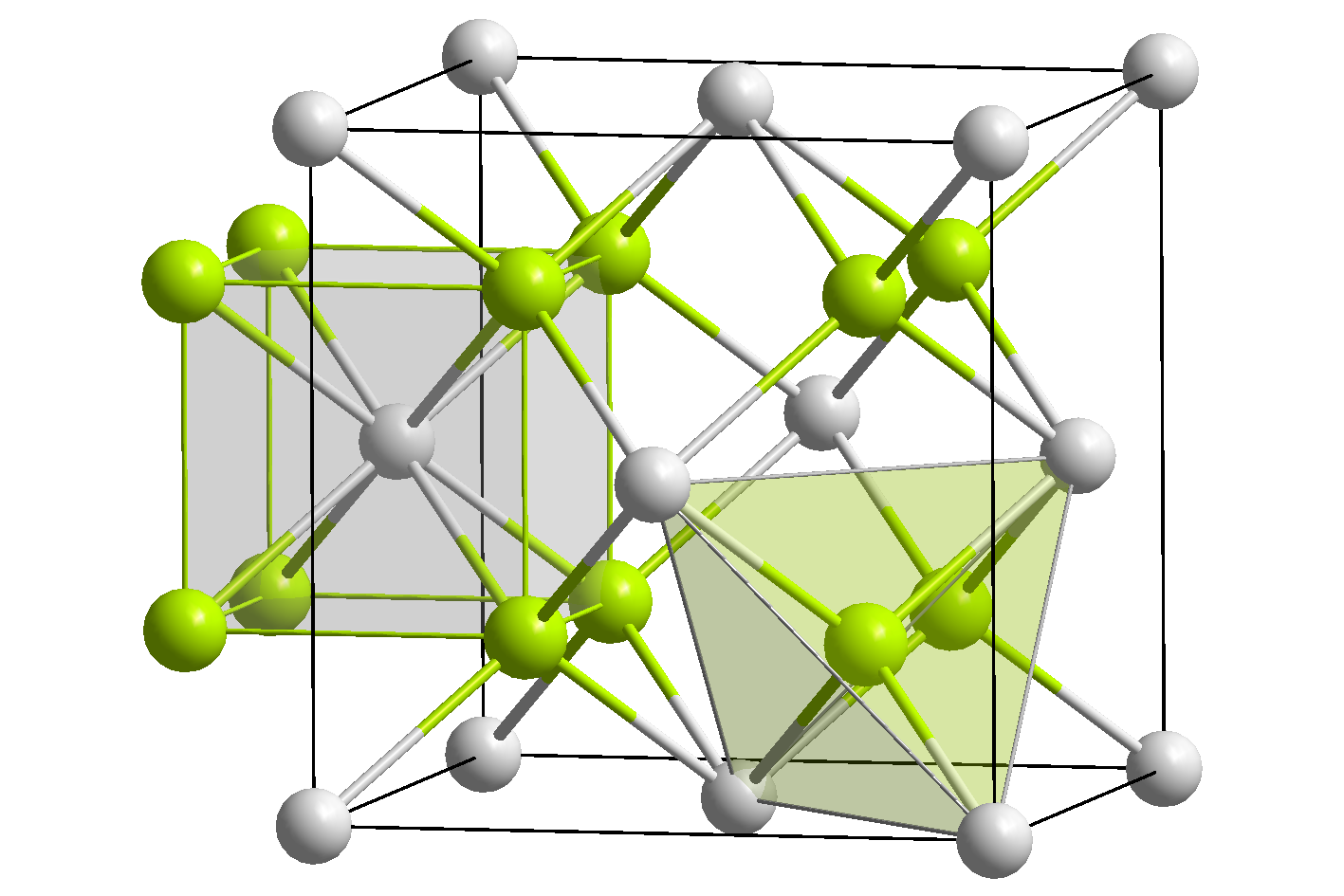
- __ Li^{+} __ NH^{2−}

Names
- IUPAC name Lithium imide

Identifiers
CAS Number	12135-01-2
3D model (JSmol)	Interactive image
- InChI: Key: LWEQKNGYZUCTTC-UHFFFAOYSA-N; InChI=1S/2Li.HN/h;;1H/q2*+1;-2
- SMILES: [Li+].[Li+].[NH-2]

Properties
Chemical formula	Li_{2}NH
Molar mass	28.897 g/mol
Appearance	White solid
Density	1.48 g/cm^{3}
- Except where otherwise noted, data are given for materials in their standard state (at 25 °C [77 °F], 100 kPa). Infobox references

Lithium imide is an inorganic compound with the chemical formula Li_{2}NH. This white solid can be formed by a reaction between lithium amide and lithium hydride.

LiNH_{2} + LiH → Li_{2}NH + H_{2}

The product is light-sensitive and can undergo disproportionation to lithium amide and characteristically red lithium nitride.

2 Li_{2}NH → LiNH_{2} + Li_{3}N

Lithium imide is thought to have a simple face-centered cubic structure with a Fm3̅m space group; with N-H bond distances of 0.82(6) Å and a H–N–H bond angle of 109.5°, giving it a similar structure to lithium amide.

Lithium imide is strongly basic and deprotonates even some extremely weak acids such as methane and ammonia, due to the very localized negative charge on the nitrogen, which carries two formal charges. It has uses in organic and organometallic chemistry. It has been investigated as a material for hydrogen storage.
