= Tris(dimethylamino)aluminium dimer =

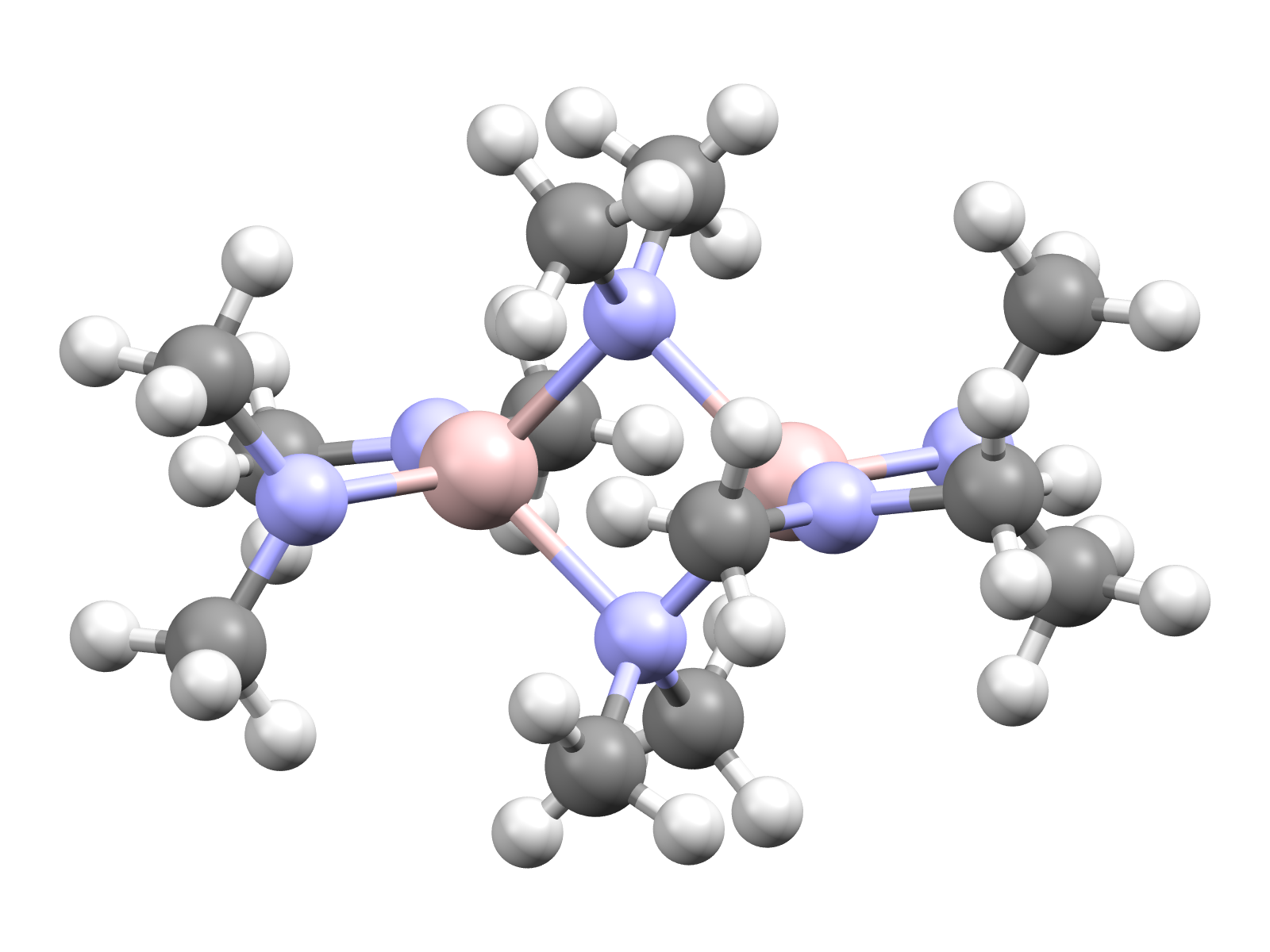

Names
- IUPAC name N-[bis(dimethylamino)alumanyl]-N-methylmethanamine

Identifiers
CAS Number	32093-39-3
3D model (JSmol)	Interactive image
ChemSpider	21170557
ECHA InfoCard	100.154.691
EC Number	626-275-2
PubChem CID	16688802
CompTox Dashboard (EPA)	DTXSID60586931
- InChI: InChI=1S/6C2H6N.2Al/c6*1-3-2;;/h6*1-2H3;;/q6*-1;2*+3 Key: JGZUJELGSMSOID-UHFFFAOYSA-N
- SMILES: CN(C)[Al](N(C)C)N(C)C.CN(C)[Al](N(C)C)N(C)C

Properties
Chemical formula	C_{12}H_{36}Al_{2}N_{6}
Molar mass	318.425 g·mol^{−1}
Appearance	Colorless solid
Density	0.865 g/cm^{3}
Melting point	82-84 °C
Boiling point	90 °C

Hazards
- Occupational safety and health (OHS/OSH)
Main hazards	Flammable, Corrosive
- GHS labelling
Pictograms	(GHS02: Flammable) (GHS05: Corrosive)
Signal word	Danger
Hazard statements	H260, H314
Precautionary statements	P223, P231+P232, P260, P264, P280, P301+P330+P331, P303+P361+P353, P304+P340, P305+P351+P338, P310, P321, P335+P334, P363, P370+P378, P402+P404, P405, P501
Flash point	21.1 °C
- Except where otherwise noted, data are given for materials in their standard state (at 25 °C [77 °F], 100 kPa). verify (what is ?) Infobox references

Tris(dimethylamino)aluminium dimer, formally bis(μ-dimethylamino)tetrakis(dimethylamino)dialuminium, is an amide complex of aluminium. This compound may be used as a precursor to other aluminium complexes.

Commercially available, this compound may be prepared from lithium dimethylamide and aluminium trichloride.
