= Arsinide =

Names
- IUPAC name Arsanide
- Other names: Arsinide; Dihydridoarsenate(1−); Dihydridoarsenate(III); Dihydrogen arsenate(III)

Identifiers
CAS Number	13937-35-4
3D model (JSmol)	Interactive image
ChEBI	CHEBI:29755
ChemSpider	19232526
Gmelin Reference	217243
- InChI: InChI=1S/AsH2/h1H2/q-1 Key: DRQOYSLXOZXEBV-UHFFFAOYSA-N
- SMILES: [AsH2-]

Properties
Chemical formula	AsH_{2}^{−}
Molar mass	76.938 g·mol^{−1}

Related compounds
Related compounds	Arsanylium AsH^{+}_{2}; Arsine AsH_{3}; Azanide NH^{−}_{2}; Phosphanide PH^{−}_{2}
- Except where otherwise noted, data are given for materials in their standard state (at 25 °C [77 °F], 100 kPa). Infobox references

An arsinide, arsanide, dihydridoarsenate(1−) or arsanyl compound is a chemical derivative of arsine, where one hydrogen atom is replaced with a metal or cation. The arsinide ion has formula AsH^{−}_{2}. It can be considered as a ligand with name arsenido or arsanido. Few chemists study arsanyl compounds, as they are both toxic and unstable. The IUPAC names are arsanide and dihydridoarsenate(1−). For the ligand the name is arsanido. The neutral −AsH_{2} group is termed arsanyl.

== Formation ==
Alkali metal arsinides can form by bubbling arsine through a liquid ammonia solution of alkali metal such as sodium, potassium or alkaline earth metal such as calcium.

Arsinides are also formed when arsine reacts with thin layers of alkali metals.

The arsine may reduce some compounds to metals, so for example an attempt to make an indium arsinide results in metallic indium.

== Reactions ==
When heated, metal hydrogen arsinide and metal dihydrogen arsinide compounds lose hydrogen to become a metal arsenide:

NaAsH_{2} → NaAs + H_{2}

With lithium dihydrogen arsinide LiAsH_{2}, it can also lose arsine AsH_{3} to become dilithium hydrogen arsinide Li_{2}AsH:

2 LiAsH_{2} → Li_{2}AsH + AsH_{3}

These reactions take place even at room temperature, and result in a discolouration of the original chemical.

Sodium dihydrogen arsinide NaAsH_{2} reacts with alkyl halides RX (where X = F, Cl, Br, I, and R is alkyl) to make dialkylarsine AsHR_{2}. Potassium dihydrogen arsinide KAsH_{2} reacts with alkyl halides to make trialkylarsine AsR_{3}.

Sodium dihydrogen arsinide NaAsH_{2} reacts with diethyl carbonate (CH_{3}CH_{2}O)_{2}CO to yield the 2-arsaethynolate [OCAs]^{−} ion, (analogous with cyanate [OCN]^{−} ion) which can be crystallised with the sodium ion Na^{+} and 18-crown-6.

Arsinides react with water to yield arsine AsH_{3}:

KAsH_{2} + H_{2}O → KOH + AsH_{3}

Potassium dihydrogen arsinide KAsH_{2} reacts with halobenzenes C_{6}H_{5}X, where X = Cl, Br, I (chlorobenzene C_{6}H_{5}Cl, bromobenzene C_{6}H_{5}Br, iodobenzene C_{6}H_{5}I) to produce benzene C_{6}H_{6}, tetraphenyldiarsine (C_{6}H_{5})_{2}As−As(C_{6}H_{5})_{2} and triphenylarsine As(C_{6}H_{5})_{3}.

Potassium dihydrogen arsinide KAsH_{2} reacts with a silyl halide, e.g. chlorosilane SiH_{3}Cl, producing trisilylarsine.

Potassium dihydrogen arsinide KAsH_{2} reacts with H_{2}As−BH_{2}·N(CH_{3})_{3} and a crown ether resulting in [K(C_{12}H_{24}O_{6})]^{+}[H_{2}As−BH_{2}−AsH_{2}]^{−}.

== List ==
Formula	Name	Crystal system	Space group	Unit cell (Å)	Volume	Density	Comment	ref
LiAsH_{2}	Lithium arsanide							
Li_{2}AsH	Dilithium arsanide						decomposition at 0°C	
LiAsH_{2}·2NH_{3}								
LiAsH_{2}·4NH_{3}								
NaAsH_{2}	Sodium arsanide						white; decomposition at room temperature	
Na_{2}AsH	Disodium arsanide							
NaAsH_{2}·2NH_{3}								
NaAsH_{2}·4NH_{3}								
Li^{+}[Al(AsH_{2})_{4}]^{−}	Lithium tetraarsanidoaluminate							
(Dipp_{2}Nacnac)Al(AsH_{2})_{2} Dipp_{2}Nacnac=HC[C(Me)N(2,6-iPr_{2}C_{6}H_{3})]_{2}								
IDipp⋅AlH_{2}AsH_{2} IDipp=1,3-bis(2,6-diisopropylphenyl)imidazolin-2-ylidene)		monoclinic	I2/a				colourless	
IDipp⋅AlH(AsH_{2})_{2}		monoclinic	I2/a	a 18.3591 b 9.0485 c 34.4864 β 91.580°				
KAsH_{2}	Potassium arsanide						stable to 80°C; decomposition at 90°C	
Ca(AsH_{2})_{2}	Calcium arsanide							
(Dipp_{2}Nacnac)Ga(AsH_{2})_{2}								
IDipp⋅GaH_{2}AsH_{2}		monoclinic	I2/a				colourless	
IDipp⋅GaH(AsH_{2})_{2}		monoclinic	I2/a	a 18.465 b 9.1493 c 34.661 β 91.509°				
Th(Tren^{TRIPS})AsH_{2}							Th-As 3.065 Å	
U(Tren^{TRIPS})AsH_{2}							U-As 3.004 Å	

== Related ==
The hydrogen atoms in the arsinide anion may be substituted by organic or other groups which can then also produce ions, for example by methyl −CH_{3}, like in potassium methyl arsinide (K^{+}CH_{3}AsH^{−}), or by trimethylsilyl −Si(CH_{3})_{3}. The doubly bonded ligand =AsH (or AsH^{2−}) is called arsinidene.
