= Azanide =

Anion derived from deprotonation of ammonia

Amide anion
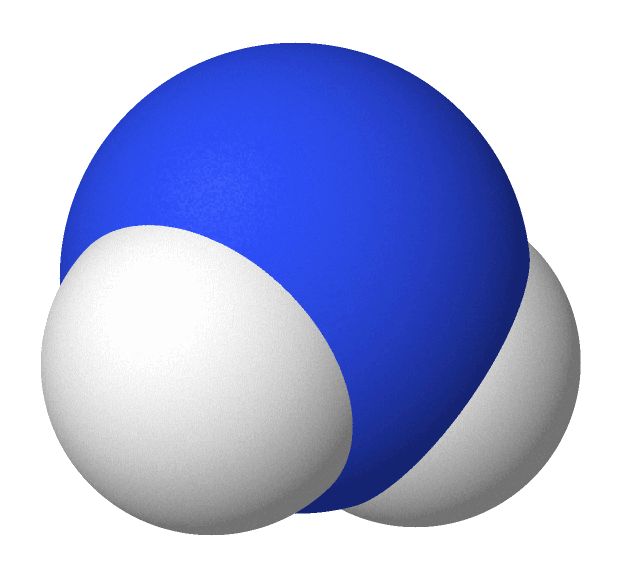

Names
| Pronunciation | /ˈæzənaɪd/ |
- IUPAC name Azanide
- Other names: Amide; Amide ion; Ammonia ion; Ammonide; Dihydrogen azanide; Dihydrogen nitride; Monoamide

Identifiers
| CAS Number | 17655-31-1 |
| 3D model (JSmol) | Interactive image; Interactive image |
| ChEBI | CHEBI:29337 |
| ChemSpider | 2104824 |
| PubChem CID | 2826723 |
| CompTox Dashboard (EPA) | DTXSID80385105 |
- InChI: InChI=1S/H2N/h1H2/q-1 Key: HYGWNUKOUCZBND-UHFFFAOYSA-N
- SMILES: [NH2-]; [N-]

Properties
| Chemical formula | NH^{−}_{2} |
| Molar mass | 16.023 g·mol^{−1} |
| Conjugate acid | Ammonia |

Structure
| Molecular shape | Bent |

Related compounds
| Other anions | Phosphanide; Arsinide; Imide; Nitride; Nitridohydride |
| Related isoelectronic | water, fluoronium |
- Except where otherwise noted, data are given for materials in their standard state (at 25 °C [77 °F], 100 kPa). Infobox references

Azanide is the IUPAC-sanctioned name for the anion NH^{−}_{2}. The term is obscure; derivatives of NH^{−}_{2} are almost invariably referred to as amides, despite the fact that amide also refers to the organic functional group –C(=O)−NR_{2}. The anion NH^{−}_{2} is the conjugate base of ammonia, so it is formed by the self-ionization of ammonia. It is produced by deprotonation of ammonia, usually with strong bases or an alkali metal. Azanide has a H–N–H bond angle of 104.5°, nearly identical to the bond angle in the isoelectronic water molecule.

== Alkali metal derivatives ==
The alkali metal derivatives are best known, although usually referred to as alkali metal amides. Examples include lithium amide, sodium amide, and potassium amide. These salt-like solids are produced by treating liquid ammonia with strong bases or directly with the alkali metals (blue liquid ammonia solutions due to the solvated electron):

2 M + 2 NH_{3} → 2 MNH_{2} + H_{2}, where M = Li, Na, K

Silver(I) amide (AgNH_{2}) is prepared similarly.

Transition metal complexes of the amido ligand are often produced by salt metathesis reaction or by deprotonation of metal ammine complexes.
