= Inorganic imide =

The inorganic imide is an inorganic chemical compound containing

- an anion with the chemical formula HN^{2−}, in which nitrogen atom is covalently bonded to one hydrogen atom (as in lithium imide Li_{2}NH and calcium imide CaNH). The other name of that anion is monohydrogen nitride.
- functional groups with the chemical formulas −NH− or =NH, in which nitrogen atom is also covalently bonded to one hydrogen atom, with two covalent single bonds or one covalent double bond from the nitrogen atom to other atoms, respectively (as in heptasulfur imide S_{7}NH, sulfur diimide S(=NH)_{2} and nitroxyl O=NH).

Organic imides have the functional groups −NH− or =NH as well.

The imides are related to the inorganic amides, containing the H_{2}N^{−} anions, the nitrides, containing the N^{3−} anions and the nitridohydrides or nitride hydrides, containing both nitride N^{3−} and hydride H^{−} anions.

In addition to solid state imides, molecular imides are also known in dilute gases, where their spectrum can be studied.

When covalently bound to a metal, an imide ligand produces a transition metal imido complex.

When the hydrogen of the imide group is substituted by an organic group, an organoimide results. Complexes of actinide and rare earth elements with organoimides are known.

== Properties ==
Lithium imide undergoes a phase transition at 87 °C where it goes from an ordered to a more symmetric disordered state.

== Structure ==
Many imides have a cubic rock salt structure, with the metal and nitrogen occupying the main positions. The position of the hydrogen atom is hard to determine, but is disordered.

Many of the heavy metal simple imide molecules are linear. This is due to the filled 2p orbital of nitrogen donating electrons to an empty d orbital on the metal.

=== Imides in coordination chemistry ===
In coordination chemistry, transition metal imido complexes feature the NR^{2-} ligand. They are similar to oxo ligands in some respects. In some the M-N-C angle is 180º but often the angle is decidedly bent. The parent imide (NH^{2-}) is an intermediate in nitrogen fixation by synthetic catalysts.

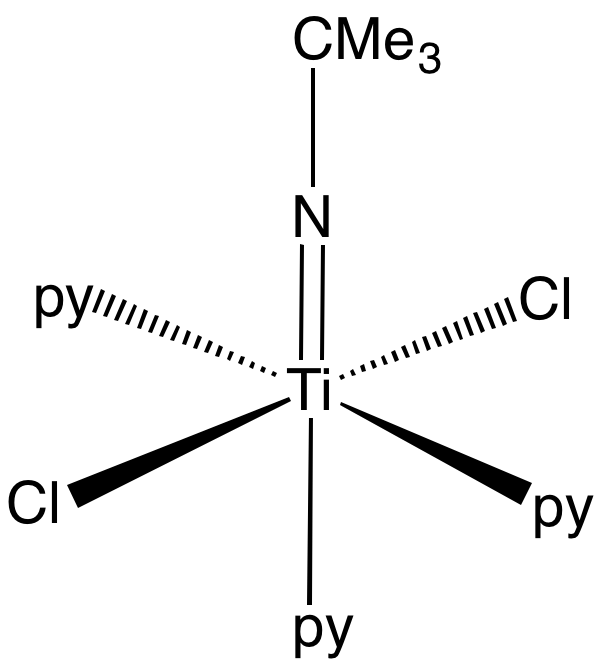
Structure of a representative imido complex (py = pyridine, CMe_{3} = tert-butyl)

== Formation ==
Heating lithium amide with lithium hydride yields lithium imide and hydrogen gas. This reaction takes place as released ammonia reacts with lithium hydride.

Heating magnesium amide to about 400 °C yields magnesium imide with the loss of ammonia. Magnesium imide itself decomposes if heated between 455 and 490 °C.

Beryllium imide forms from beryllium amide when heated to 230 °C in a vacuum.

When strontium metal is heated with ammonia at 750 °C, the dark yellow strontium imide forms.

When barium vapour is heated with ammonia in an electrical discharge, the gaseous, molecular BaNH is formed. Molecules ScNH, YNH, and LaNH are also known.

== Hydrogen storage ==
Inorganic imides are of interest because they can reversibly store hydrogen, which may be important for the hydrogen economy. For example, calcium imide can store 2.1% mass of hydrogen. Li_{2}Ca(NH)_{2} reversibly stores hydrogen and release it at temperatures between 140 and 206 °C. It can reversibly hold 2.3% hydrogen. When hydrogen is added to the imide, amides and hydrides are produced. When imides are heated, they can yield hydridonitrides or nitrides, but these may not easily reabsorb hydrogen.

== List ==
=== Ionic ===
name	formula	structure	space group	unit cell	references
Lithium imide	Li_{2}NH	cubic	Fm3̅m	a=5.0742	
Beryllium imide	BeNH				
Magnesium imide	MgNH	hexagonal	P6/m	a = 11.567 Å c = 3.683Å Z=12	
Dilithium magnesium imide	Li_{2}Mg(NH)_{2}				
Disilicon dinitride imide	Si_{2}N_{2}(NH)				
	K_{2}Si(NH)_{3}	amourphous			
	K_{2}Si_{2}(NH)_{5}	amourphous			
	K_{2}Si_{3}(NH)_{7}	amourphous			
potassium imido nitrido silicate	K_{3}Si_{6}N_{5}(NH)_{6}	cubic	P4_{3}32	a = 10.789	
Calcium imide	CaNH	hexagonal	Fm3m		
Dilithium calcium imide	Li_{2}Ca(NH)_{2}	hexagonal			
Magnesium calcium diimide	MgCa(NH)_{2}	cubic			
Lithium calcium magnesium imide	Li_{4}CaMg(NH)_{4}				
Strontium imide	SrNH	orthorhombic	Pmna	a =7.5770 b =3.92260 c =5.69652 Z=4	
Tin(IV) diamide imide	Sn(NH_{2})_{2}NH				
Barium imide	BaNH	tetragonal	I4/mmm	a=4.062 c=6.072 Z=2	
Lanthanum imide	La_{2}(NH)_{3}	rock salt		a=5.32	
Cerium(II) imide	CeNH				
Ytterbium(II) imide	YbNH	cubic		a=4.85	
	[NH_{4}][Hg_{3}(NH)_{2}](NO_{3})_{3}	cubic	P4_{1}32	a = 10.304, Z = 4	
Thorium(IV) dinitride imide	Th_{2}N_{2}(NH)	hexagonal	P3m1̅	a = 3.886 c = 6.185 Å	

=== Molecular ===
name	formula	structure	symmetry	CAS	references
Boron imide	B_{2}(NH)_{3}	polymer			
Nitroxyl; Azanal; Azanone	HNO	bent		14332-28-6	
Aluminium amide imide	Al(NH_{2})(NH)	polymer			
Silicon dimide	Si(NH)_{2}				
Thionitrosyl hydride; Azanethial; Azanethione	HNS	bent		14616-59-2	
Sulfur diimide	S(NH)_{2}				
Heptasulfur imide	S_{7}NH			293-42-5	
1,2,3,4,5,7,6,8-Hexathiadiazocane; 1,3-Hexasulfurdiimide; 1,3-Diazacyclooctasulfane	H_{2}N_{2}S_{6}			1003-75-4	
1,2,3,4,6,7,5,8-Hexathiadiazocane; 1,4-Hexasulfurdiimide; 1,4-Diazacyclooctasulfane	H_{2}N_{2}S_{6}			1003-76-5	
1,2,3,5,6,7,4,8-Hexathiadiazocane; 1,5-Hexasulfurdiimide; 1,5-Diazacyclooctasulfane	H_{2}N_{2}S_{6}				
1,2,3,5,7,4,6,8-Pentathiatriazocane; 1,3,5-Pentasulfurtriimide; 1,3,5-Triazacyclooctasulfane	H_{3}N_{3}S_{5}			638-50-6	
Scandium(II) imide	ScNH				
Gallium(III) imide	Ga_{2}(NH)_{3}	polymer			
Yttrium(II) imide	YNH				
Barium imide	BaNH	linear			
Lanthanum(II) imide	LaNH	linear	C∞v		
Cerium(II) imide	CeNH	linear	C∞v		
Uranimine nitride	N≡U=N−H				
Uranimine dihydride	HN=UH_{2}				

Molecular imines of other actinides called neptunimine and plutonimine have been postulated to exist in the gas phase or noble gas matrix.
