= Transition metal imido complex =

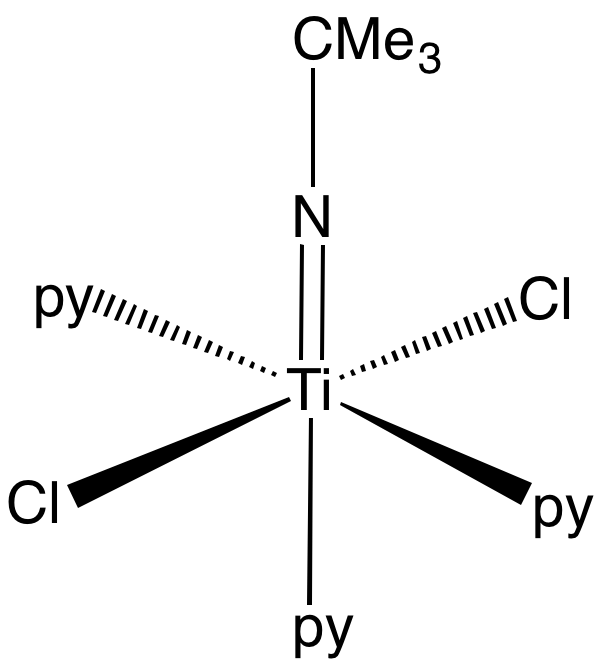
Structure of a representative imido complex (py = pyridine, CMe_{3} = tert-butyl)

In coordination chemistry and organometallic chemistry, transition metal imido complexes is a coordination compound containing an imido ligand. Imido ligands can be terminal or bridging ligands. The parent imido ligand has the formula NH, but most imido ligands have alkyl or aryl groups in place of H. The imido ligand is generally viewed as a dianion, akin to oxide.

== Structural classes ==
Core of W(NAr)_{2}(N(H)Ar)_{2} (Ar = C_{6}H_{3}-2,6-iPr_{2}).

=== Complexes with terminal imido ligands ===
In some terminal imido complexes, the M=N−C angle is 180° but often the angle is decidedly bent. Complexes of the type M=NH are assumed to be intermediates in nitrogen fixation by synthetic catalysts.

Typical Schrock-style olefin metathesis catalyst features imides as spectator ligands.

=== Complexes with bridging imido ligands ===
Imido ligands are observed as doubly and, less often, triply bridging ligands.

== Synthesis ==
=== From metal oxo complexes ===
Commonly metal-imido complexes are generated from metal oxo complexes. They arise by condensation of amines and metal oxides and metal halides:

L_{n}MO + H_{2}NR → L_{n}MNR + H_{2}O

This approach is illustrated by the conversion of MoO_{2}Cl_{2} to the diimido derivative MoCl_{2}(NAr)_{2}(dimethoxyethane), precursors to the Schrock carbenes of the type Mo(OR)_{2}(NAr)(CH-t-Bu).

L_{n}MCl_{2} + 3 H_{2}NR → L_{n}MNR + 2 RNH_{3}Cl

Aryl isocyanates react with metal oxides concomitant with decarboxylation:

L_{n}MO + O=C=NR → L_{n}MNR + CO_{2}

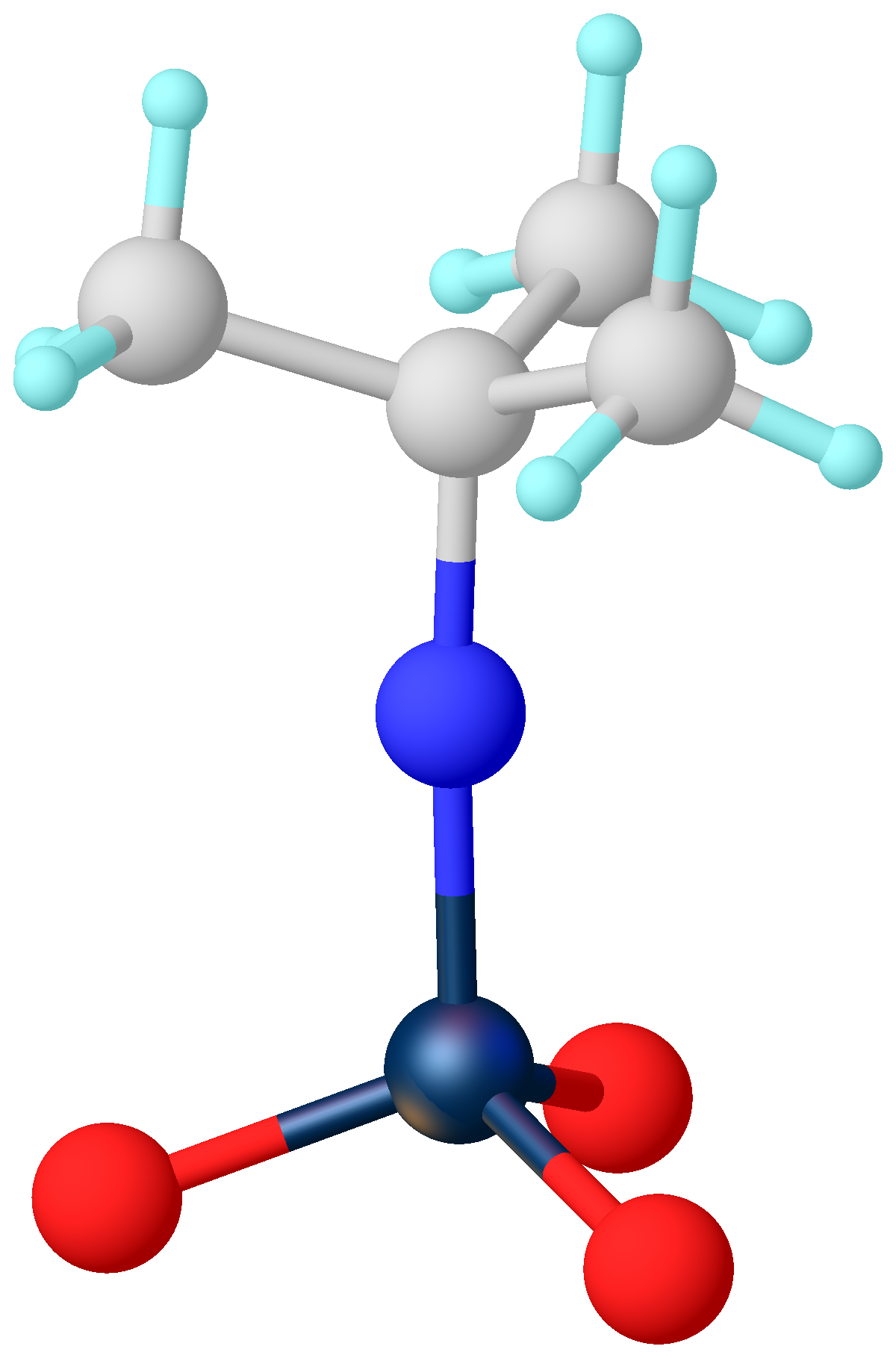
Structure of OsO_{3}(N-t-Bu) (multiple bonds are not drawn explicitly). Selected distances: Os-N, 1.689; Os-O, 1.678 Å.

=== Alternative routes ===
Some are generated from the reaction of low-valence metal complexes with azides:

L_{n}M + N_{3}R → L_{n}MNR + N_{2}

A few imido complexes have been generated by the alkylation of metal nitride complexes:

L_{n}MN^{−} + RX → L_{n}MNR + X^{−}

== Utility ==
Metal imido complexes are mainly of academic interest. They are however assumed to be intermediates in ammoxidation catalysis, in the Sharpless oxyamination, and in nitrogen fixation.

=== In nitrogen fixation ===
A molybdenum imido complex appears in a common nitrogen fixation cycle:

Mo•N_{2} → Mo-N=N^{−} → Mo-N=NH (diazenido) → Mo-N=NH_{2}^{+} → Mo=N-NH_{2} (hydrazido) → Mo=N-NH_{3}^{+} (hydrazidium) → Mo≡N (nitrido) + NH_{3} → Mo≡NH^{+} → Mo=NH (imido) → Mo=NH_{2}^{+} → Mo-NH_{2} (amido) → Mo-NH_{3}^{+} → Mo•NH_{3} (ammine);

with the oxidation state of molybdenum varying to accommodate the number bonds from nitrogen.
