= Potassium amide =

- Structural formula of potassium amide

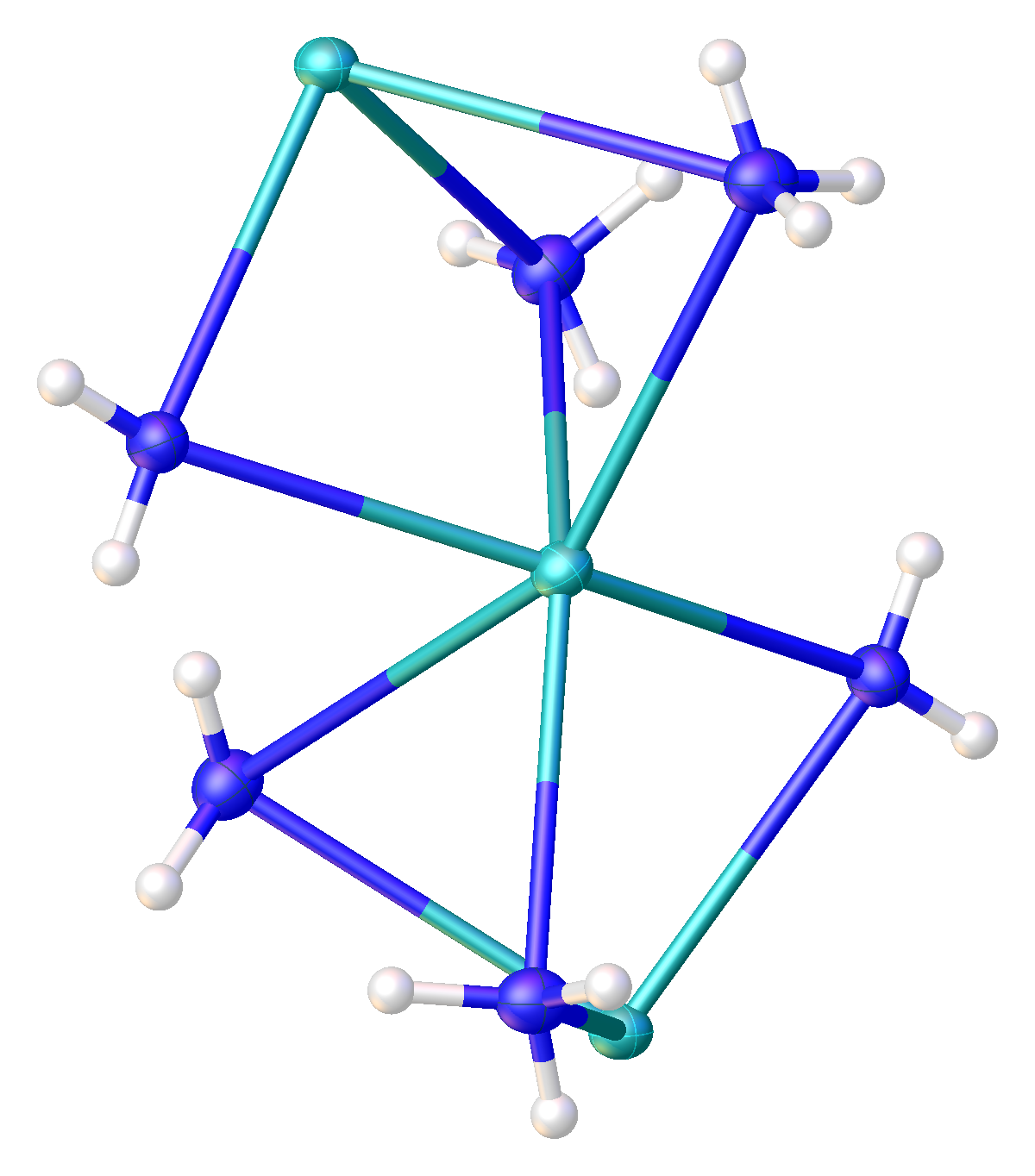

Names
- IUPAC name Potassium amide
- Other names Potassamide

Identifiers
CAS Number	17242-52-3
3D model (JSmol)	Interactive image
ChemSpider	78490
ECHA InfoCard	100.037.508
EC Number	241-275-9
PubChem CID	87015
CompTox Dashboard (EPA)	DTXSID4066177
- InChI: InChI=1S/K.H2N/h;1H2/q+1;-1 Key: FEMRXDWBWXQOGV-UHFFFAOYSA-N; InChI=1/K.H2N/h;1H2/q+1;-1 Key: FEMRXDWBWXQOGV-UHFFFAOYAQ
- SMILES: [NH2-].[K+]

Properties
Chemical formula	KNH_{2}
Molar mass	55.121 g·mol^{−1}
Appearance	white solid
Odor	ammonia-like
Density	1.57 g/cm ^{3}
Melting point	338 °C (640 °F; 611 K)
Solubility in water	reacts
Solubility	ammonia: 3.6 g/(100 mL)

Thermochemistry
Std enthalpy of formation (Δ_{f}H^{⦵}_{298})	−128.9 kJ/mol

Related compounds
Other cations	Lithium amide Sodium amide
- Except where otherwise noted, data are given for materials in their standard state (at 25 °C [77 °F], 100 kPa). verify (what is ?) Infobox references

Potassium amide is an inorganic compound with the chemical formula KNH_{2}. Like other alkali metal amides, it is a white solid that hydrolyzes readily. It is a strong base.

== Production ==
Potassium amide is produced by the reaction of ammonia with potassium. The reaction typically requires a catalyst.

== Structure ==
Traditionally KNH_{2} is viewed as a simple salt, but it has significant covalent character and is highly aggregated in ammonia solution. The compound has been characterized by X-ray crystallography as the solvent-free form as well as the mono- and diammonia solvates. In KNH_{2}·2NH_{3}, the potassium centers are each bonded to two amido ligands and four ammonia ligands, all six of which bridge to adjacent potassium centers. The result is a chain of hexacoordinate potassium ions. The K–NH_{2} distances are 2.7652(11) whereas the K–NH_{3} distances are respectively 2.9234(11) and 3.0698(11) Å.
