= Lithium amide =

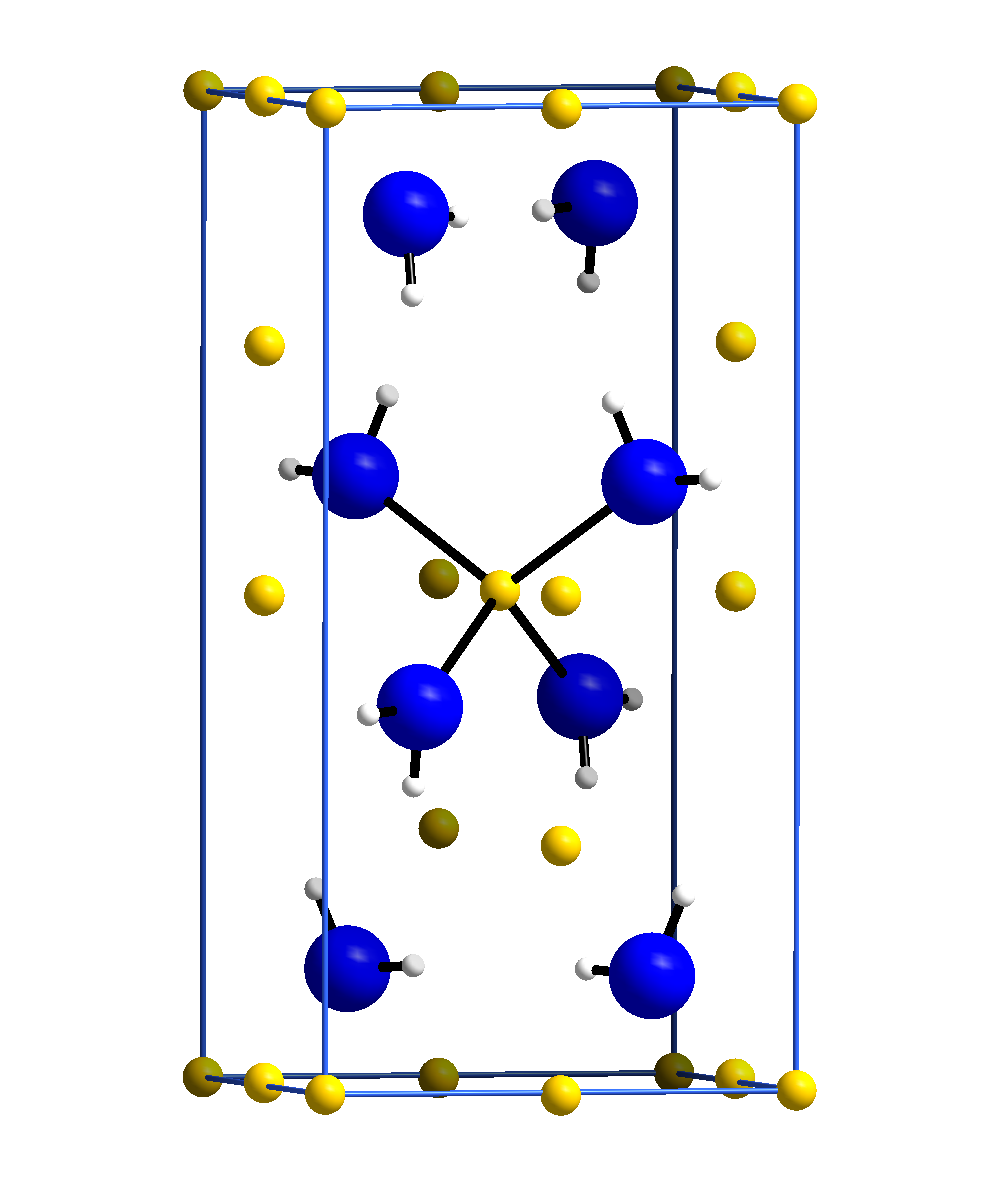
- __ Li^{+} __ N^{3−} __ H^{+}

Names
- IUPAC name Lithium amide
- Other names Lithium azanide Lithamide

Identifiers
CAS Number	7782-89-0
3D model (JSmol)	Interactive image
ChemSpider	22939
ECHA InfoCard	100.029.062
PubChem CID	24532
UNII	7393OMU9LK
CompTox Dashboard (EPA)	DTXSID7064815
- InChI: InChI=1S/Li.H2N/h;1H2/q+1;-1 Key: AFRJJFRNGGLMDW-UHFFFAOYSA-N; InChI=1/Li.H2N/h;1H2/q+1;-1 Key: AFRJJFRNGGLMDW-UHFFFAOYAO
- SMILES: [Li+].[NH2-]

Properties
Chemical formula	LiNH_{2}
Molar mass	22.96 g·mol^{−1}
Appearance	white solid
Density	1.178 g/cm^{3}
Melting point	375 °C (707 °F; 648 K)
Boiling point	430 °C (806 °F; 703 K) decomposes
Solubility in water	reacts
Solubility	slightly soluble in ethanol insoluble in ammonia

Thermochemistry
Std enthalpy of formation (Δ_{f}H^{⦵}_{298})	−182 kJ/mol

Hazards
NFPA 704 (fire diamond)	3 1 2 W
- Except where otherwise noted, data are given for materials in their standard state (at 25 °C [77 °F], 100 kPa). verify (what is ?) Infobox references

Lithium amide or lithium azanide is an inorganic compound with the chemical formula LiNH_{2}. It is a white solid with a tetragonal crystal structure. Lithium amide can be made by treating lithium metal with liquid ammonia:

2 Li + 2 NH_{3} → 2 LiNH_{2} + H_{2}

Lithium amide decomposes into ammonia and lithium imide upon heating.

== Applications ==
Lithium amide, when mixed with lithium hydride, shows applications in hydrogen storage.The reaction begins with lithium amide's decomposition into ammonia and lithium imide. Lithium hydride then deprotonates ammonia to form lithium amide. The reverse reaction can occur between hydrogen and the lithium imide side product.

== Other lithium amides ==
The conjugate bases of amines are known as amides. Thus, a lithium amide may also refer to any compound in the class of the lithium salt of an amine. These compounds have the general form LiNR_{2}, with the chemical lithium amide itself as the parent structure. Common lithium amides include lithium diisopropylamide (LDA), lithium tetramethylpiperidide (LiTMP), and lithium hexamethyldisilazide (LiHMDS). They are produced by the reaction of Li metal with the appropriate amine:

2 Li + 2 R_{2}NH → 2 LiNR_{2} + H_{2}

Lithium amides are very reactive compounds. Specifically, they are strong bases.

=== Examples ===
Lithium tetramethylpiperidide has been crystallised as a tetramer. On the other hand, the lithium derivative of bis(1-phenylethyl)amine crystallises as a trimer:

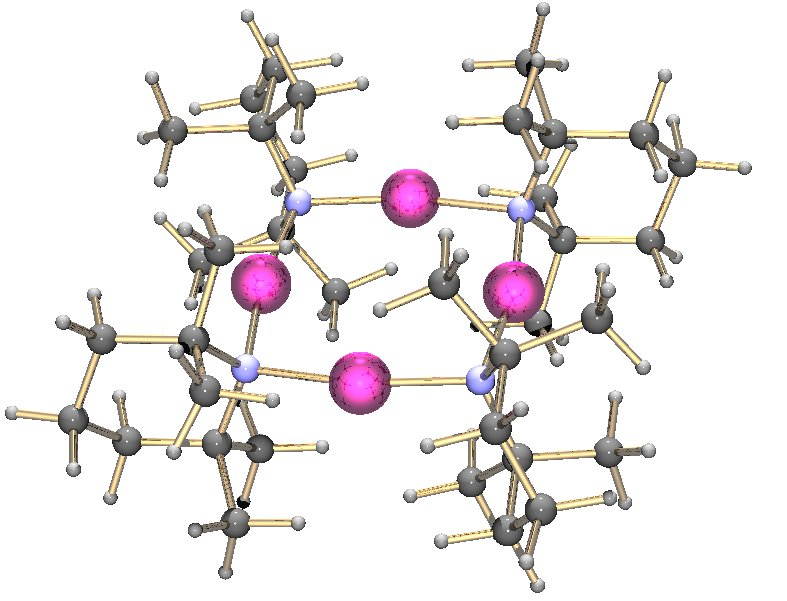
Tetrameric lithium tetramethylpiperidide

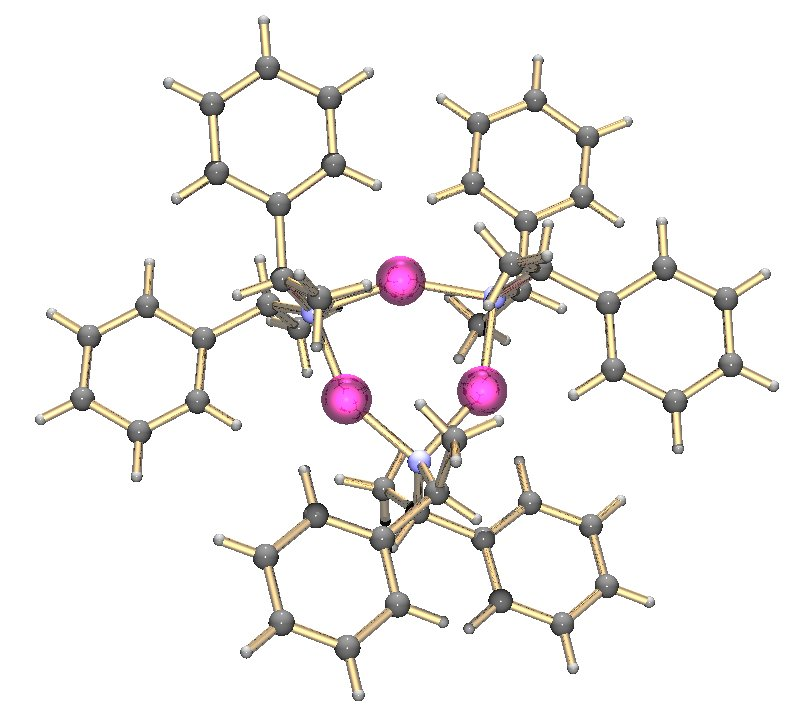
Trimeric lithium bis(1-phenylethyl)amide

It is also possible to make mixed oligomers of metal alkoxides and amides. These are related to the superbases, which are mixtures of metal alkoxides and alkyls. The cyclic oligomers form when the nitrogen of the amide forms a sigma bond to a lithium, while the nitrogen lone pair binds to another metal centre.

Other organolithium compounds (such as BuLi) are generally considered to exist in and function via high-order, aggregated species.

== See also ==
- Sodium amide
- Potassium amide
- Butyllithium
- Lithium imide
- Lithium nitride
