= Tetrakis(dimethylamido)titanium =

Tetrakis(dimethylamino)titanium (IV)
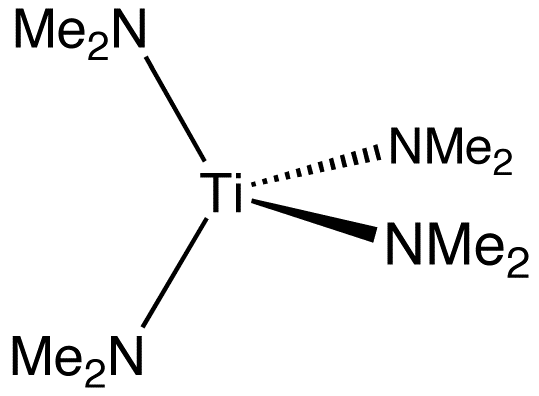
- Stereo wireframe model of tetrakis(dimethylamino)titanium(IV)

Names
- Preferred IUPAC name Tetrakis(dimethylamino)titanium(IV)
- Systematic IUPAC name Dimethyl[tris(dimethylamino)titanio]amine
- Other names Titanium(IV) dimethylamide

Identifiers
CAS Number	3275-24-9
3D model (JSmol)	Interactive image
Abbreviations	TDMAT
ChemSpider	13870283
ECHA InfoCard	100.019.914
EC Number	221-904-3
PubChem CID	123185
UN number	2924 3398
CompTox Dashboard (EPA)	DTXSID3062946
- InChI: InChI=1S/4C2H6N.Ti/c4*1-3-2;/h4*1-2H3;/q4*-1;+4 Key: MNWRORMXBIWXCI-UHFFFAOYSA-N; InChI=1S/4C2H6N.Ti/c4*1-3-2;/h4*1-2H3;/q4*-1;+4 Key: MNWRORMXBIWXCI-UHFFFAOYSA-N
- SMILES: CN(C)[Ti](N(C)C)(N(C)C)N(C)C

Properties
Chemical formula	C_{8}H_{24}N_{4}Ti
Molar mass	224.19 g/mol
Appearance	yellow liquid
Density	0.947 g/cm^{3}
Boiling point	50 °C (122 °F; 323 K) at 0.05 mmHg
Solubility in water	reacts with water

Hazards
- GHS labelling
Pictograms	(GHS02: Flammable) (GHS05: Corrosive)
Signal word	Danger
Hazard statements	H225, H260, H314
Precautionary statements	P210, P223, P231+P232, P280, P303+P361+P353, P305+P351+P338
NFPA 704 (fire diamond)	3 3 2

Related compounds
Related compounds	Tetrakis(dimethylamido)vanadium
- Except where otherwise noted, data are given for materials in their standard state (at 25 °C [77 °F], 100 kPa). verify (what is ?) Infobox references

Tetrakis(dimethylamino)titanium (TDMAT), also known as Titanium(IV) dimethylamide, is a chemical compound. The compound is generally classified as a metalorganic species, meaning that its properties are strongly influenced by the organic ligands but the compound lacks metal-carbon bonds. It is used in chemical vapor deposition to prepare titanium nitride (TiN) surfaces and in atomic layer deposition as a titanium dioxide precursor. The prefix "tetrakis" refers the presence of four of the same ligand, in this case dimethylamides.

== Preparation and properties ==
Tetrakis(dimethylamino)titanium is a conventional Ti(IV) compound in the sense that it is tetrahedral and diamagnetic. Unlike the many alkoxides, the diorganoamides of titanium are monomeric and thus at least somewhat volatile. It is prepared from titanium tetrachloride (which is also tetrahedral, diamagnetic, and volatile) by treatment with lithium dimethylamide:

TiCl_{4} + 4 LiNMe_{2} → Ti(NMe_{2})_{4} + 4 LiCl

Like many amido complexes, TDMAT is quite sensitive toward water, and its handling requires air-free techniques. The ultimate products of its hydrolysis is titanium dioxide and dimethylamine:

Ti(NMe_{2})_{4} + 2 H_{2}O → TiO_{2} + 4 HNMe_{2}

In a related reaction, the compound undergoes exchange with other amines, evolving dimethylamine.

== Use ==
TMAT has been used in metalorganic chemical vapor deposition (MOCVD).
