= Phosphanide =

Identifiers
3D model (JSmol)	Interactive image
ChEBI	CHEBI:29938
ChemSpider	56490
Gmelin Reference	284
PubChem CID	62746
CompTox Dashboard (EPA)	DTXSID30936328
- InChI: InChI=1S/H2P/h1H2/q-1 Key: JZWFHNVJSWEXLH-UHFFFAOYSA-N
- SMILES: [H][P-][H]

Properties
Chemical formula	PH^{−}_{2}
Molar mass	32.990 g·mol^{−1}
- Except where otherwise noted, data are given for materials in their standard state (at 25 °C [77 °F], 100 kPa). Infobox references

Phosphanides are chemicals containing the [PH_{2}]^{−} anion. This is also known as the phosphino anion or phosphido ligand. The IUPAC name can also be dihydridophosphate(1−).

It can occur as a group phosphanyl -PH_{2} in organic compounds or ligand called phosphanido, or dihydridophosphato(1−). A related substance has PH^{2−}. Phosphinidene (PH) has phosphorus in a −1 oxidation state.

As a ligand PH_{2} can either bond to one atom or be in a μ_{2}-bridged ligand across two metal atoms. With transition metals and actinides, bridging is likely unless the metal atom is mostly enclosed in a ligand.

In phosphanides, phosphorus is in the −3 oxidation state. When phosphanide is oxidised, the first step is phosphinite ([H_{2}PO]^{−}). Further oxidation yields phosphonite ([HPO_{2}]^{2−}) and phosphite ([PO_{3}]^{3−}).

The study of phosphine derivatives is unpopular, because they are unstable, poisonous and malodorous.

== Formation ==
Alkali metal phosphanides can be made from phosphine and the metal dissolved in liquid ammonia. Sodium phosphanide can also be made from phosphine and triphenylmethyl sodium. Lithium phospahnide can be made from phosphine and butyl lithium or phenyl lithium.

Another way to produce -PH_{2} complexes is by hydrolysis of a -P(SiMe_{3})_{2} compound with an alcohol, such as methanol.

Yet another way is to remove a hydrogen atom from the phosphine in a phosphine complex by using a strong base.

== Properties ==
When calcium phosphanide is heated, it decomposes by releasing phosphine and yielding the phosphanediide: CaPH. With further heating a binary calcium phosphide is formed. Other compounds may also lose hydrogen as well as phosphine.

Phosphanides can react with CCl_{4} to substitute Cl for H giving a -PCl_{2} compound. Similarly CBr_{4} can produce -PBr_{2}. Also AgBF_{4} can react to yield -PF_{2}.

Sodium phosphanide can react with ethyl alcohol in a diethyl carbonate solution to yield sodium 2-phosphaethynolate (NaOCP). Na(DME)_{2}OCP is also formed from NaPH_{2} when reacted with CO in a dimethoxyethane (DME) solution under pressure.

== List ==
name	formula	system	space group	unit cell Å	volume	density	M-P Å	comment	ref
lithium phosphanide	LiPH_{2}								
Bis(1,2-dimethoxyethane-O,O′)lithium-phosphanide	(dme)_{2}LiPH_{2}	monoclinic		a=13.911 b=8.098 c=12.491 β=103.35°	1371.9	1.07			
	Li(PH_{2})(BEt_{3})_{2}								
	LiPH_{2}(BH_{3})_{2}(THF)_{2}								
sodium dihydrogenphosphide	NaPH_{2}								
	Na_{13}(PH_{2})(O^{t}Bu)_{12}								
tetraphosphanylsilane	Si(PH_{2})_{4}								
	KPH_{2}								
	Ca(PH_{2})_{2}•6NH_{3}								
	Ca(PH_{2})_{2}•2NH_{3}								
	Cp_{2}(CO)_{4}Cr_{2}(μ-PH_{2})(μ-H)								
	Cp_{2}(CO)_{4}Cr_{2}(μ-PH_{2})_{2}								
	[(CO)_{4}Cr(μ-PH_{2})]_{2}	orthorhombic	Cmca	a =12.2545 b =11.5949 c=9.7196					
	(CO)_{4}Cr(μ-PH_{2})_{2}Cr(CO)_{3}(PH_{3})	triclinic	P1̅	a=7.008 b=7.430 c=8.871, α =111.05° β=92.73° γ=114.08°					
	Mn(PH_{2})_{2} · 3 NH_{3}								
	K_{2}[Mn(PH_{2})_{4}] · 2 NH_{3}								
	[(CO)_{4}MnPH_{2}]_{2}	triclinic	P1̅	a = 6.804, b = 7.064, c = 9.191, α =110.5°, β = 91.92°, γ =115.65°, Z = 1					
	(μ-PH_{2})_{2} · Mn_{2}(CO_{8}) + (μ-Br)(μ-PH_{2})Mn_{2}(CO_{8})	monoclinic	P2_{1}/c	a = 9.467, b = 12.181, c = 13.086, β = 109.98°	1418.2				
	[(CO)_{4}MnPH_{2}]_{3}	monoclinic	P2/n	a = 9.052, b = 9.748, c = 12.642, β = 109.1°, Z = 2					
	(μ-Br)(μ-PH_{2})Mn_{2}(CO_{8})								
	[(CO)_{3}Fe(μ-PH_{2})]_{2}	monoclinic	P2_{1}/m	a =6.2476 b =12.982 c =7.2193 β =90.14°					
	Cp(CO)_{2}Fe(μ-PH_{2})Fe(CO)_{4}								
bis((ethane-1,2-diyl)bis(dimethylphosphine))-(hydrido)-(dihydridophosphide)-iron	Fe(dmpe)_{2}(H)PH_{2}	triclinic	P1̅	a=9.2246 b=12.4638 c=17.3198 α=89.872° β=88.482° γ=89.228°					
	Co(PH_{2})_{3}								
	KCo_{2}(PH_{2})_{7}								
	cp(CO)_{2}Fe(μ-PH_{2})Fe(CO)_{4}	monoclinic	P2_{1}/c	a = 7.336, b = 10.898, c = 17.616, β = 99.65°, Z = 4			2.29, 2.265		
	cp(CO)_{2}Fe(μ-PH_{2})Fe(CO)(NO)_{2}								
	cp(CO)_{2}Fe(μ-PH_{2})Vcp(CO)_{3}								
	cp(CO)_{2}Fe(μ-PH_{2})Crcp(CO)(NO)								
	cp(CO)_{2}Fe(μ-PH_{2})Cr(CO)_{5}								
	cp(CO)Fe(μ-CO, μ-PH_{2})Crcp(NO)								
	cp(CO)_{2}Fe(μ-PH_{2})MnMecp(CO)_{2}	monoclinic	P2_{1}	a = 7.501, b = 22.345, c = 9.741, β = 106.23°, Z = 4					
	cp(CO)_{2}Fe(μ-PH_{2})Mn(NO)_{3}								
	cp(CO)_{2}Fe(μ-PH_{2})Mncp(CO)_{2}								
	cp(CO)Fe(μ-CO, μ-PH_{2})Mncp(CO)								
	cp(CO)Fe(μ-CO, μ-PH_{2})MnMecp(CO)								
(μ_{2}-phosphido)-octacarbonyl-iron-manganese	FeMn(CO)_{8}(μ-PH_{2})	triclinic	P1̅	a=7.8647 b=9.223 c=9.368, α=90.966° β=91.141° γ=110.032°					
	Li^{+}[FeMn(CO)_{8}(μ_{3}-PH)Mn(CO)_{4}(μ-PH_{2})Fe(CO)_{4}]^{−}								
	Na^{+}[FeMn(CO)_{8}(μ_{3}-PH)Mn(CO)_{4}(μ-PH_{2})Fe(CO)_{4}]^{−}								
	K^{+}[FeMn(CO)_{8}(μ_{3}-PH)Mn(CO)_{4}(μ-PH_{2})Fe(CO)_{4}]^{−}								
	cp(CO)_{2}Fe(μ-PH_{2})Co(CO)_{2}(NO)								
	Ni(PH_{2})_{2}								
	[cpNiPH_{2}]_{2}								
	[cpNiPH_{2}]_{3}	rhombohedral	R3	a = 16.861, c = 5.611 Z = 3				6 member ring	
	K[Ni(PH_{2})_{3}]							orange, green or black	
	cp(CO)_{2}Fe(μ-PH_{2})Ni(CO)_{3}								
	CH{(CMe)(2,6-^{i}Pr_{2}C_{6}H_{3}N)}_{2}Ge^{II}PH_{2}	monoclinic	P2_{1}/c	a=14.1380 b=16.3244 c=13.8086 β=116.379 Z=4	2855.1	1.213		orange or red	
	[CH{(CMe)(2,6-^{i}Pr_{2}C_{6}H_{3}N)}_{2}Ge^{II}P(H)]_{2}	triclinic	P1̅	a=10.8175 b=12.0783 c=2.6434 α=91.550 β=108.361 γ=111.339 Z=1	1441.49	1.203		red	
bisphosphanyl yttriate	[(Me_{3}Si)_{2}Cp]2Y(PH_{2})_{2}[Li(TMEDA)]_{2}Cl								
(N,N',N''-[nitrilotri(ethane-2,1-diyl)]tris(t-butyl(dimethyl)silanamino))-phosphanyl-zirconium(iv)	Zr(Tren^{DMBS})(PH_{2}) Tren^{DMBS}=N(CH_{2}CH_{2}NSiMe_{2}Bu^{t})_{3}	orthorhombic	Pbca	a=19.978 b=15.4052 c=22.721			Zr−P=2.690	yellow	
	{Cp(CO)_{2}Mo}_{2}(μ-PH_{2})(μ-H)								
	Mo_{2}Cp_{2}(μ-PH_{2})_{2}(CO)_{2}								
	cp(CO)_{2}Fe(μ-PH_{2})Mo(CO)_{5}								
	{Cp(CO)_{2}W}_{2}(μ-PH_{2})(μ-H)								
	W_{2}Cp_{2}(μ-PH_{2})_{2}(CO)_{2}								
	[(CO)_{4}W(μ-PH_{2})]_{2}	orthorhombic	Cmca	a=12.498 b=12.046 c=10.1185					
	[(CO)_{5}W(μ-PH_{2})]_{2}^{−}								
	(CO)_{4}W(μ-PH_{2})_{2}W(CO)_{3}(PH_{3})			a=7.008 b=7.430 c=8.871, α =111.05° β =92.73° γ=114.08°					
	(CO)_{4}W(μ-PH_{2})_{2}W(CO)_{2}(PH_{3})_{2}	triclinic	P1̅	a=7.014 b=9.386 c=13.632, α=70.15° β=79.82° γ=68.78°					
	NMe_{3}•H_{2}BPH_{2•}•W(CO)_{5}								
phosphanylalane	NMe_{3}•H_{2}AlPH_{2}•W(CO)_{5}								
	cp(CO)_{2}Fe(μ-PH_{2})W(CO)_{5}								
phosphanygallane	NMe_{3}•H_{2}GaPH_{2•}•W(CO)_{5}								
	Re_{2}(μ-PH_{2})_{2}(CO)_{8}	monoclinic	P2_{1}/c	a=9.808 b=12.326 c=13.299 β=109.08° Z=4	1519.4	2.896		yellow	
	Re_{2}(μ-H) · (μ-PH_{2})(CO)_{8}							yellow	
	Os(η^{2}-O_{2}CCH_{3})(PH_{2})(CO)(PPh_{3})_{2}								
	Os(η^{2}-N,N-dimethyldithiocarbamate)(PH_{2})(CO)(PPh_{3})_{2}								
	Os(η^{2}-acetylacetonate)(PH_{2})(CO)(PPh_{3})_{2}								
	Os(η^{2}-NO_{2})(PH_{2})(CO)(PPh_{3})_{2}								
	OsCl- (PH_{2})(CO)_{2}(PPh_{3})_{2}								
	OsCl- (PH_{2})(CO)(PPh_{3})_{3}								
	[Os(μ2-PH_{2})Cl(CO)(PPh_{3})_{2}]_{2}	triclinic	P1	a 14.101, b 15.091, c 11.708, α 96.68, β 91.71, γ 63.92°, Z = 1	2222.0				
	OsH(PH_{2})(CO)_{2}(PPh_{3})_{2}								
(μ_{2}-Hydrido)-(μ_{2}-phosphido)-acetonitrilo-henicosacarbonyl-hexa-osmium	Os_{6}(μ-H)(CO)_{21}(NCMe)(μ-PH_{2})	monoclinic	P2_{1}/n	a=11.161 b=12.532 c =26.60, β=90.03°					
(μ_{2}-Phosphido)-(μ_{2}-hydrido)-bis(undecacarbonyl-tri-osmium)	Os_{6}(μ-H)(CO)_{22}(μ-PH_{2})	monoclinic	P2_{1}/c	a =14.328 b =16.658 c =15.258, β =103.79°					
	Os_{6}(μ-H)(CO)_{21}(CNBu^{t})(μ-PH_{2})								
	[Os_{6}(μ-H)(CO)_{20}{P(OMe)_{3}}_{2}(μ-PH_{2})]_{3}								
	Ir(CO)ClH(PEt_{3})_{2}(PH_{2})								
	Ir(CO)BrH(PEt_{3})_{2}(PH_{2})								
(Acetato-O,O')-(μ_{2}-phosphonito)-carbonyl-iodo-bis(triphenylphosphine)-gold-osmium dichloromethane solvate	Os(η^{2}-O_{2}CCH_{3})(PH_{2}AuI)(CO)(PPh_{3})_{2} · (CH_{2}Cl_{2})_{2}	triclinic	P1̅	a=12.320 b=13.962 c=14.122, α=96.76° β=101.93° γ=107.72°					
phosphanido-(N'-(triisopropylsilyl)-N,N-bis(2-((triisopropylsilyl)amino)ethyl)ethane-1,2-diaminato)-thorium(iv)	Th(Tren^{TIPS})(PH_{2})	monoclinic	P2_{1}/n	a=18.6189 b=22.6046 c=22.2818 β=113.726°			2.982	colourless	
	PH_{2}–UH						2.762	in solid argon	
Tren^{TIPS}=N(CH_{2}CH_{2}NSiPr^{i}_{3})_{3}	U(Tren^{TIPS})(PH_{2})	monoclinic	P2_{1}/n	a=12.9994 b=16.2006 c=20.3678 β=91.313 Z=4	4288.3		2.883	yellow	

== Derivatives ==
Some derivatives of phosphanides have also been studied where hydrogen is substituted by another group. They include bis(trimethylsilyl)phosphanide, bis (triisopropylsilyl) phosphanide, bis (trimethylsilyl) phosphanide, diphenyl phosphanide.
