= Tert-Butoxide =

tert-Butoxide may refer to:

- The conjugate base of tert-butyl alcohol
- Salts of tert-butyl alcohol, including:
  - Copper(I) tert-butoxide
  - Lithium tert-butoxide
  - Potassium tert-butoxide
  - Sodium tert-butoxide
