= Transition metal alkoxide complex =

Conjugate base of an alcohol

Structure of the methoxide anion. Although alkali metal alkoxides are not salts and adopt complex structures, they behave chemically as sources of RO^{−}.

A transition metal alkoxide complex is a kind of coordination complex containing one or more alkoxide ligands, written as RO^{−}, where R is the organic substituent. Metal alkoxides are used for coatings and as catalysts.

== Preparation ==
=== By metathesis reactions ===
Many alkoxides are prepared by salt-forming reactions from a metal chlorides and sodium alkoxide:

MCl_{n} + n NaOR → M(OR)_{n} + n NaCl

Such reactions are favored by the lattice energy of the NaCl, and purification of the product alkoxide is simplified by the fact that NaCl is insoluble in common organic solvents.

Copper(I) t-butoxide adopts a square structure, a consequence of the preference of Cu(I) for linear coordination geometry.

For electrophilic metal halides, conversion to the alkoxide requires no or mild base. Titanium tetrachloride reacts with alcohols to give the corresponding tetraalkoxides, concomitant with the evolution of hydrogen chloride:

TiCl_{4} + 4 (CH_{3})_{2}CHOH → Ti(OCH(CH_{3})_{2})_{4} + 4 HCl

The reaction can be accelerated by the addition of a base, such as a tertiary amine. Other electrophilic metal halides can be used instead of titanium, for example NbCl_{5}.

=== By electrochemical processes ===
Many alkoxides can be prepared by anodic dissolution of the corresponding metals in water-free alcohols in the presence of electroconductive additive. The metals may be Co, Ga, Ge, Hf, Fe, Ni, Nb, Mo, La, Re, Sc, Si, Ti, Ta, W, Y, Zr, etc. The conductive additive may be lithium chloride, quaternary ammonium halide, or other. Some examples of metal alkoxides obtained by this technique: Ti(OCH(CH_{3})_{2})_{4}, Nb_{2}(OCH_{3})_{10}, Ta_{2}(OCH_{3})_{10}, [MoO(OCH_{3})_{4}]_{2}, Re_{2}O_{3}(OCH_{3})_{6}, Re_{4}O_{6}(OCH_{3})_{12}, and Re_{4}O_{6}(OCH(CH_{3})_{2})_{10}.

== Reactions ==
=== Hydrolysis and transesterification ===
Aliphatic metal alkoxides decompose in water: where R is an organic substituent and L is an unspecified ligand (often an alkoxide). A well-studied case is the irreversible hydrolysis of titanium isopropoxide:

Ti(OR)_{4} + 2 H_{2}O → TiO_{2} + 4 HOR

By controlling the stoichiometry and steric properties of the alkoxide, such reactions can be arrested leading to metal-oxy-alkoxides, which usually are oligonuclear. Other alcohols can be employed in place of water. In this way one alkoxide can be converted to another, and the process is properly referred to as alcoholysis (although there is an issue of terminology confusion with transesterification, a different process - see below). The position of the equilibrium can be controlled by the acidity of the alcohol; for example phenols typically react with alkoxides to release alcohols, giving the corresponding phenoxide. More simply, the alcoholysis can be controlled by selectively evaporating the more volatile component. In this way, ethoxides can be converted to butoxides, since ethanol (b.p. 78 °C) is more volatile than butanol (b.p. 118 °C).

=== Formation of oxo-alkoxides ===
Many metal alkoxide compounds also feature oxo-ligands. Oxo-ligands typically arise via the hydrolysis, often accidentally, and via ether elimination:

2 L_{n}MOR → (L_{n}M)_{2}O + ROR

Additionally, low valent metal alkoxides are susceptible to oxidation by air.

Characteristically, transition metal alkoxides are polynuclear, that is they contain more than one metal. Alkoxides are sterically undemanding and highly basic ligands that tend to bridge metals.

Upon the isomorphic substitution of metal atoms close in properties crystalline complexes of variable composition are formed. The metal ratio in such compounds can vary over a broad range. For instance, the substitution of molybdenum and tungsten for rhenium in the complexes Re_{4}O_{6−y}(OCH_{3})_{12+y} allowed one to obtain complexes Re_{4−x}Mo_{x}O_{6−y}(OCH_{3})_{12+y} in the range 0 ≤ x ≤ 2.82 and Re_{4−x}W_{x}O_{6−y}(OCH_{3})_{12+y} in the range 0 ≤ x ≤ 2.

=== Insertion into M-OR bond ===
Alkoxide ligands are often nucleophilic. For example, molybdenum alkoxides undergo insertion reactions with unsaturated substrates such as carbon dioxide and isocyanates:

Mo_{2}(O−t−Bu)_{6} + 2 CO_{2} → Mo_{2}(O_{2}CO−t−Bu)_{2}(O−t−Bu)_{4}

=== Hydrogenolysis ===
The metal-alkoxide bond is susceptible to hydrogenolysis, especially for platinum metal derivatives:

L(n)M−OR + H_{2} → L(n)MH + HOR

== Illustrative alkoxides ==
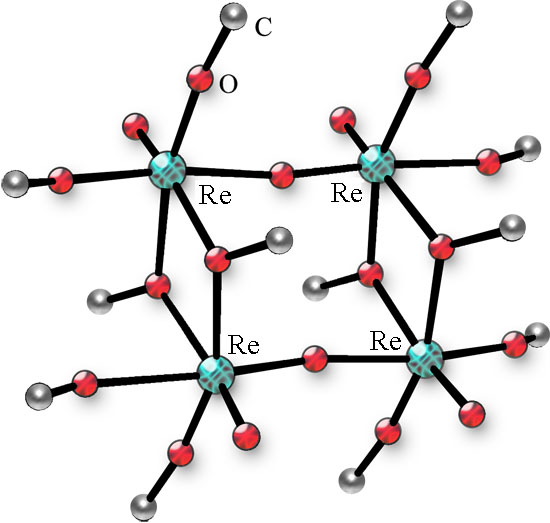
The structure of tetranuclear rhenium oxomethoxide (hydrogen atoms omitted for the sake of simplicity).

name	molecular formula	comment
Titanium isopropoxide	Ti(O^{i}Pr)_{4}	monomeric because of steric bulk, used in organic synthesis
Titanium ethoxide	Ti_{4}(OEt)_{16}	for sol-gel processing of Ti oxides
Zirconium ethoxide	Zr_{4}(OEt)_{16}	for sol-gel processing of Zr oxides
Vanadyl isopropoxide	VO(O^{i}Pr)_{3}	precursor to catalysts
Niobium ethoxide	Nb_{2}(OEt)_{10}	for sol-gel processing of Nb oxides
Tantalum ethoxide	Ta_{2}(OEt)_{10}	for sol-gel processing of Ta oxides
Hexa(tert-butoxy)dimolybdenum(III)	Mo_{2}(OCMe_{3})_{6}	metal alkoxide with a triple metal-metal bond
Hexa(tert-butoxy)ditungsten(III)	W_{2}(OCMe_{3})_{6}	metal alkoxide with a triple metal-metal bond
