= Pentacarbonyl(tetrahydrofuran)tungsten =

Chemical compound

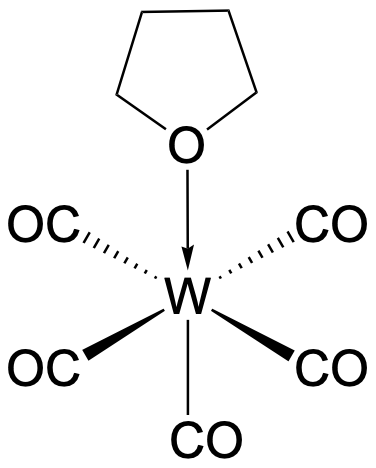

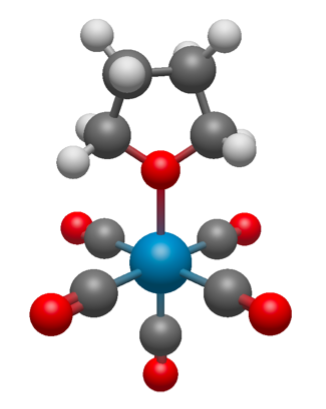

Identifiers
CAS Number	36477-75-5
3D model (JSmol)	Interactive image
ChemSpider	9308152
PubChem CID	11133033
- InChI: InChI=1S/C4H8O.5CO.W/c1-2-4-5-3-1;5*1-2;/h1-4H2;;;;;; Key: MSEICUXSETXIDF-UHFFFAOYSA-N
- SMILES: O1CCCC1.[C-]#[O+].[C-]#[O+].[C-]#[O+].[C-]#[O+].[C-]#[O+].[W]

Properties
Chemical formula	C_{9}H_{8}O_{6}W
Molar mass	396.00 g·mol^{−1}
Solubility in THF	Soluble

Hazards
- Occupational safety and health (OHS/OSH)
Main hazards	Potentially toxic if inhaled or ingested

Related compounds
Related compounds	Tungsten hexacarbonyl
- Except where otherwise noted, data are given for materials in their standard state (at 25 °C [77 °F], 100 kPa). Infobox references

Pentacarbonyl(tetrahydrofuran)tungsten is an organotungsten compound with the formula W(CO)_{5}(THF). It consists of a tungsten center with zero oxidation state coordinated to five carbonyl (CO) ligands and one tetrahydrofuran (THF) ligand. This compound was first stabilized by Raymond K. Sheline in 1965. It is typically prepared by the reaction of tungsten hexacarbonyl (W(CO)_{6}) with tetrahydrofuran under ultraviolet (UV) irradiation. This compound serves as a useful precursor in organometallic chemistry, where the labile THF ligand can be readily displaced by other ligands, allowing for the synthesis of various tungsten complexes. Due to its enhanced reactivity compared to W(CO)_{6}, it is a common starting material for the synthesis of substituted tungsten carbonyl complexes.^{[20]-[39]}

== Preparation ==
W(CO)_{5}(THF) is typically synthesized by the reaction of tungsten hexacarbonyl W(CO)_{6} with tetrahydrofuran solvent under ultraviolet (UV) irradiation for 4 hours (Figure 3). The reaction proceeds through the photolytic dissociation of one carbonyl ligand from W(CO)_{6}, allowing THF to coordinate in its place:

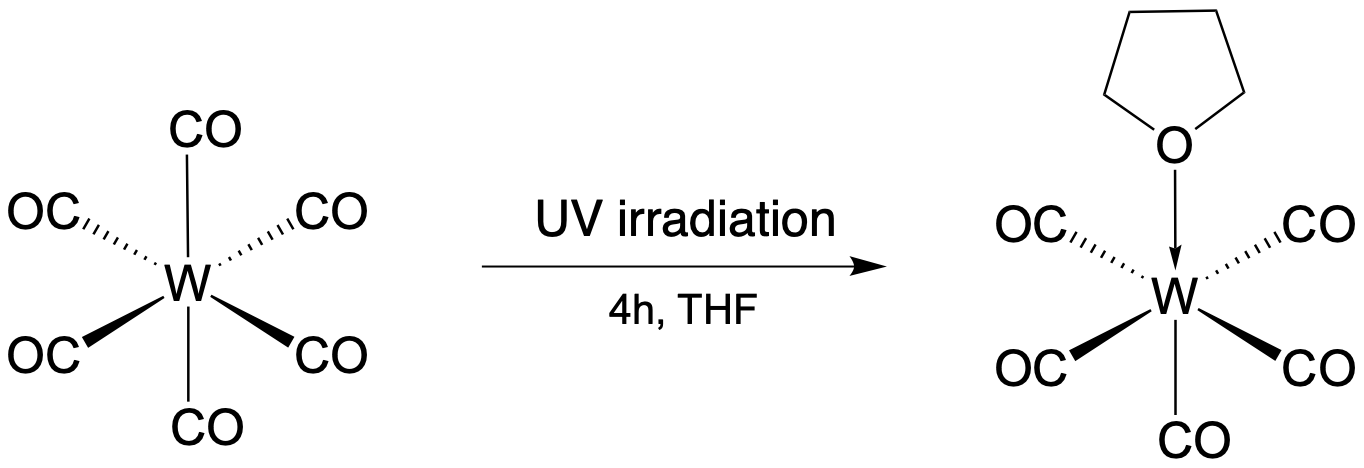
Figure 3: Synthesis of W(CO)5(THF)

This method results W(CO)_{5}(THF) as a yellow crystalline solid, which is air-sensitive and must be handled under an inert atmosphere.

== Characterization ==
The characterization of W(CO)_{5}(THF) is primarily based on spectroscopic techniques such as infrared (IR) spectroscopy. The IR spectrum of the complex exhibits distinct CO stretching frequencies (𝜈_{CO}), which differ from those observed for W(CO)_{6} (1983 reciprocal centimetres) due to the influence of the coordinated THF ligand. At 20 °C, three characteristic absorptions are observed at 2077 cm^{−1} (w), 1934 cm^{−1} (s), and 1912 cm^{−1} (ms), corresponding to the A_{1}, E, and A_{1} vibrational modes, respectively. These shifts indicate the reduced symmetry from O_{h} in W(CO)_{6} to C_{4v} in W(CO)_{5}(THF), with the THF ligand reducing back-donation to the CO ligands.

== Electronic structure ==
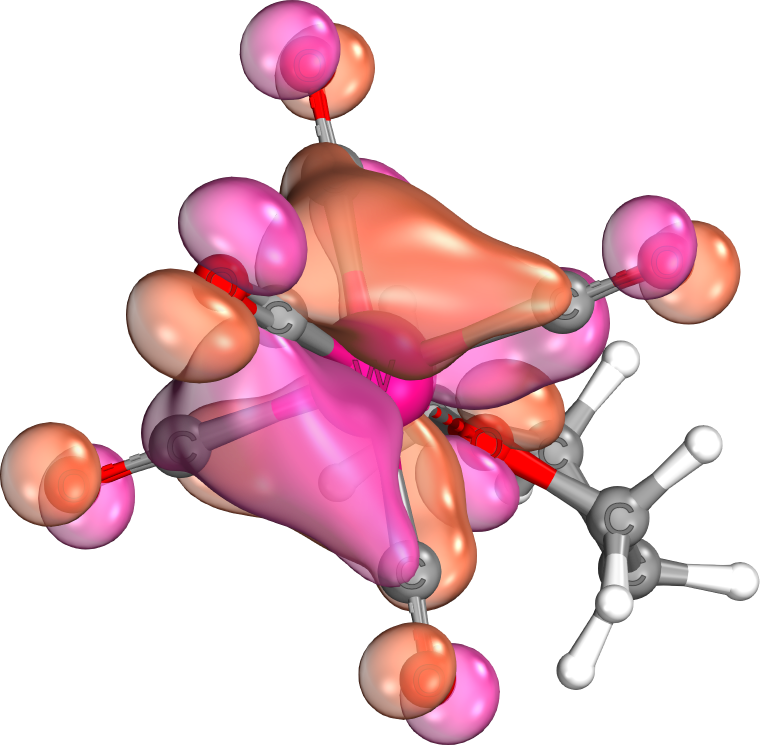
Figure 4a: Intrinsic Bonding Orbitals (IBOs) of W(CO)5(THF) generated Using B3LYP/def2-SVP level of theory and IBOView, depicting π - backdonation to CO ligands in W(CO)5(THF)

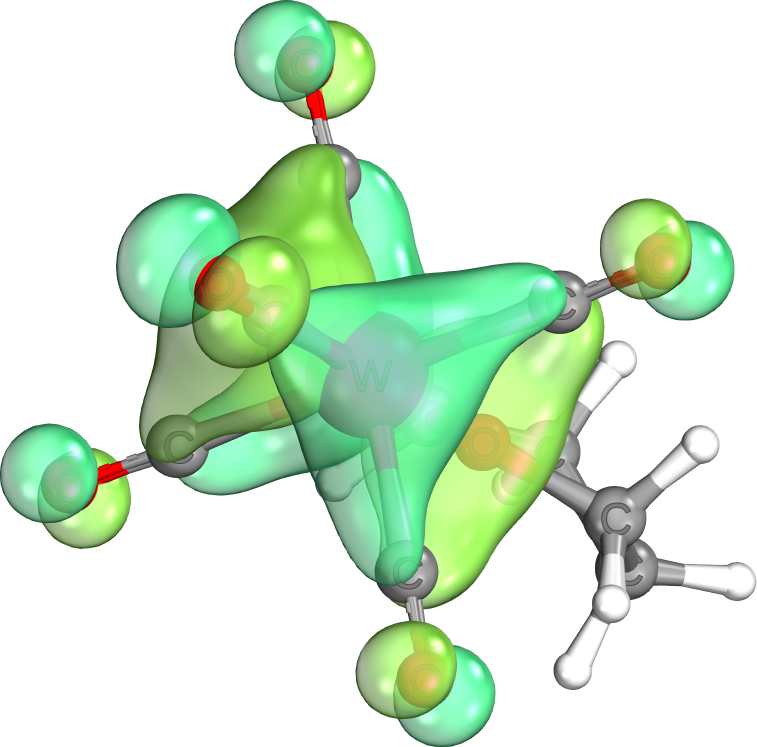
Figure 4b: Intrinsic Bonding Orbitals (IBOs) of W(CO)5(THF) generated Using B3LYP/def2-SVP level of theory and IBOView, depicting π - backdonation to CO ligands in W(CO)5(THF)

The electronic structure of W(CO)_{5}(THF) is governed by the d^{6} configuration of the tungsten(0) center, which interacts with five CO ligands and one THF ligand (Figure 2). In an idealized octahedral field, the five d-orbitals of tungsten split into two energy levels: the higher-energy e_{g} set (d_{z^{2}} and d_{x^{2} - y^{2}}) and the lower-energy t_{2g} set (d_{xy}, d_{xz}, d_{yz}). The CO ligands act as strong-field ligands based on the spectrochemical series, inducing a large Δ_{0} (octahedral splitting energy), which leads to a low-spin electron configuration where the six d-electrons occupy the lower-energy t_{2g} orbitals. The d_{z^{2}} and d_{x^{2} - y^{2}} orbitals remain largely unoccupied and serve as antibonding orbitals in metal-ligand interactions. In W(CO)_{5}(THF), the departure from perfect octahedral symmetry due to the replacement of one CO ligand by THF introduces a slight tetragonal distortion, lowering the symmetry to C_{4v} (Figure 2). This results in a slight destabilization of the d_{z^{2}} orbital, making it more available for interactions with the axial THF ligand. The tungsten center engages in both σ-donation and π-backdonation with its ligands. The CO ligands donate electron density via their lone pairs into the vacant metal 5d_{z^{2}} and 5d_{x^{2} - y^{2}} orbitals (σ-donation)(Figure 5). At the same time, the filled 5d_{xy}, 5d_{xz}, and 5d_{yz} (Figure 4a, 4b, 4c) orbitals of tungsten overlap with the empty π*-orbitals of CO, allowing for π-backdonation, which strengthens the metal-ligand bond and weakens the C–O bonds. The THF ligand, being a weaker donor, contributes primarily through σ-donation to the vacant metal 5d_{z^{2}} and 5d_{x^{2} - y^{2}} orbitals (Figure 5) without significant π-backbonding effects. Due to extensive π-backdonation to CO ligands, tungsten in W(CO)_{5}(THF) exhibits electron deficiency, making the complex highly reactive toward ligand substitution and electrophilic attack. The THF ligand is particularly labile and can be readily displaced by stronger donor ligands such as phosphines or carbenes. This reactivity enables W(CO)_{5}(THF) to participate in various transformations, including cyclization reactions and Diels-Alder reactions.

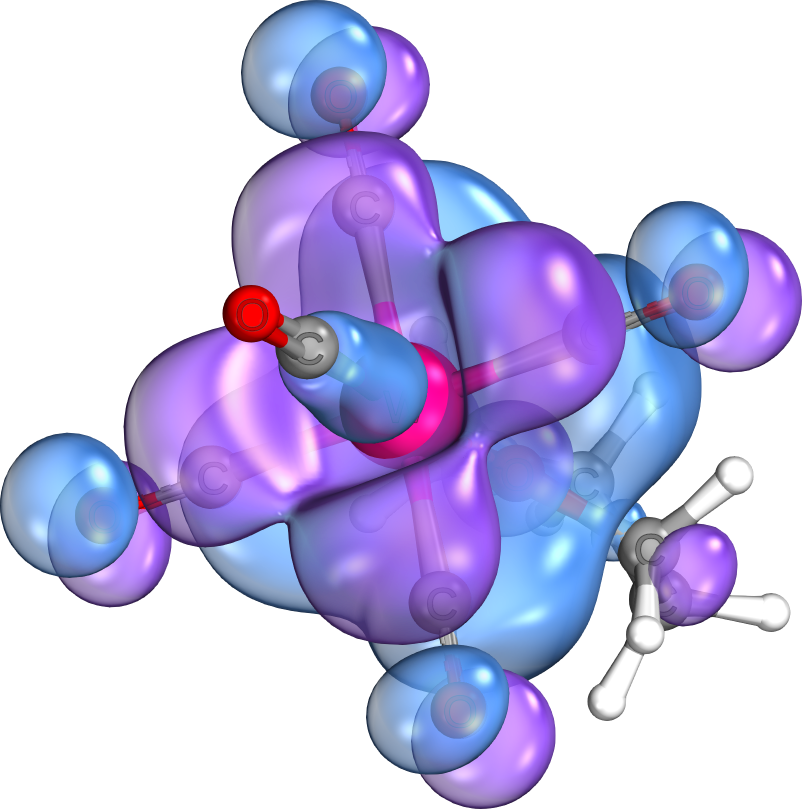
Figure 5: Intrinsic Bonding Orbitals (IBOs) of W(CO)5(THF) generated Using B3LYP/def2-SVP level of theory and IBOView, depicting σ-bonding from CO and THF ligands in W(CO)5(THF)

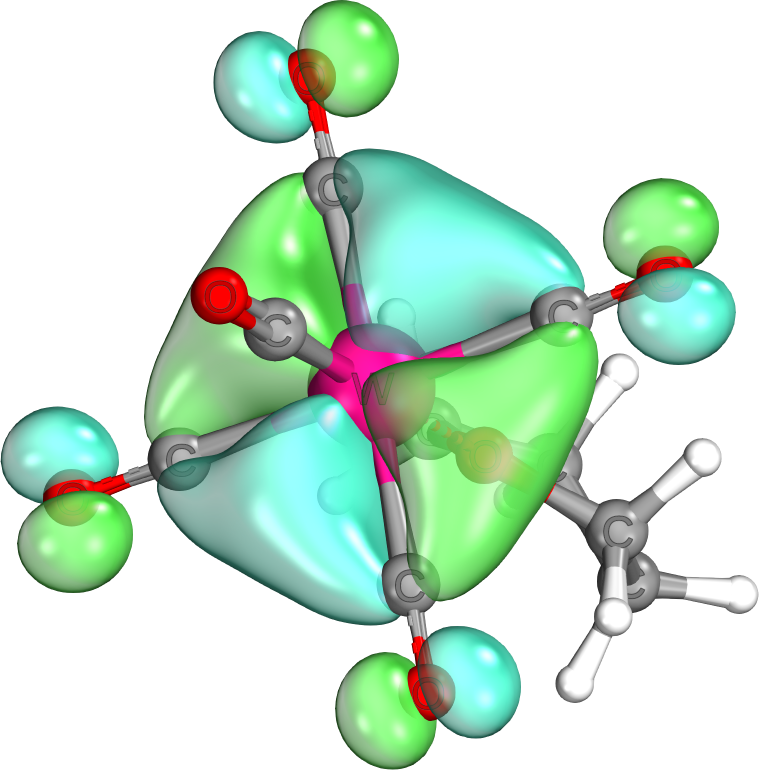
Figure 4c: Intrinsic Bonding Orbitals (IBOs) of W(CO)5(THF) generated Using B3LYP/def2-SVP level of theory and IBOView, depicting π - backdonation to CO ligands in W(CO)5(THF)

== Applications ==
=== Hetero Diels-Alder and cyclization reactions ===
The weakly coordinating nature of the THF ligand in W(CO)_{5}(THF) renders the tungsten center a potent Lewis acid, which allows it to coordinate with alkynes and carbonyl-containing substrates, facilitating a range of transformations (Figure 5 & 6). These transformations often proceed via a Fischer carbene intermediate, in which the tungsten center forms a π-complex with an alkyne, activating it toward nucleophilic attack or cyclization.

==== Hetero-Diels-Alder reactions ====
The hetero-Diels-Alder (HDA) reaction is a powerful method for synthesizing six-membered oxygen- and nitrogen-containing heterocycles (Figure 6A, 6B, 6C). W(CO)_{5}(THF) plays a crucial role in this reaction by coordinating to the alkyne component and forming Fischer carbene intermediate(Figure 6C 1), lowering the LUMO energy of the alkyne and enhancing its electrophilicity. This effect accelerates the [4+2] cycloaddition between the alkyne and an electron-rich component, leading to heterocyclic products with high regio- and stereoselectivity. For example, in β-ethynyl-α,β-unsaturated carbonyl systems (Figure 6A, 6C), W(CO)_{5}(THF) activates the alkyne functionality, promoting its selective reaction with conjugated enones or imines to form oxygen- or nitrogen-containing heterocycles. This activation is particularly useful in natural product synthesis and medicinal chemistry, where heterocyclic motifs are prevalent.

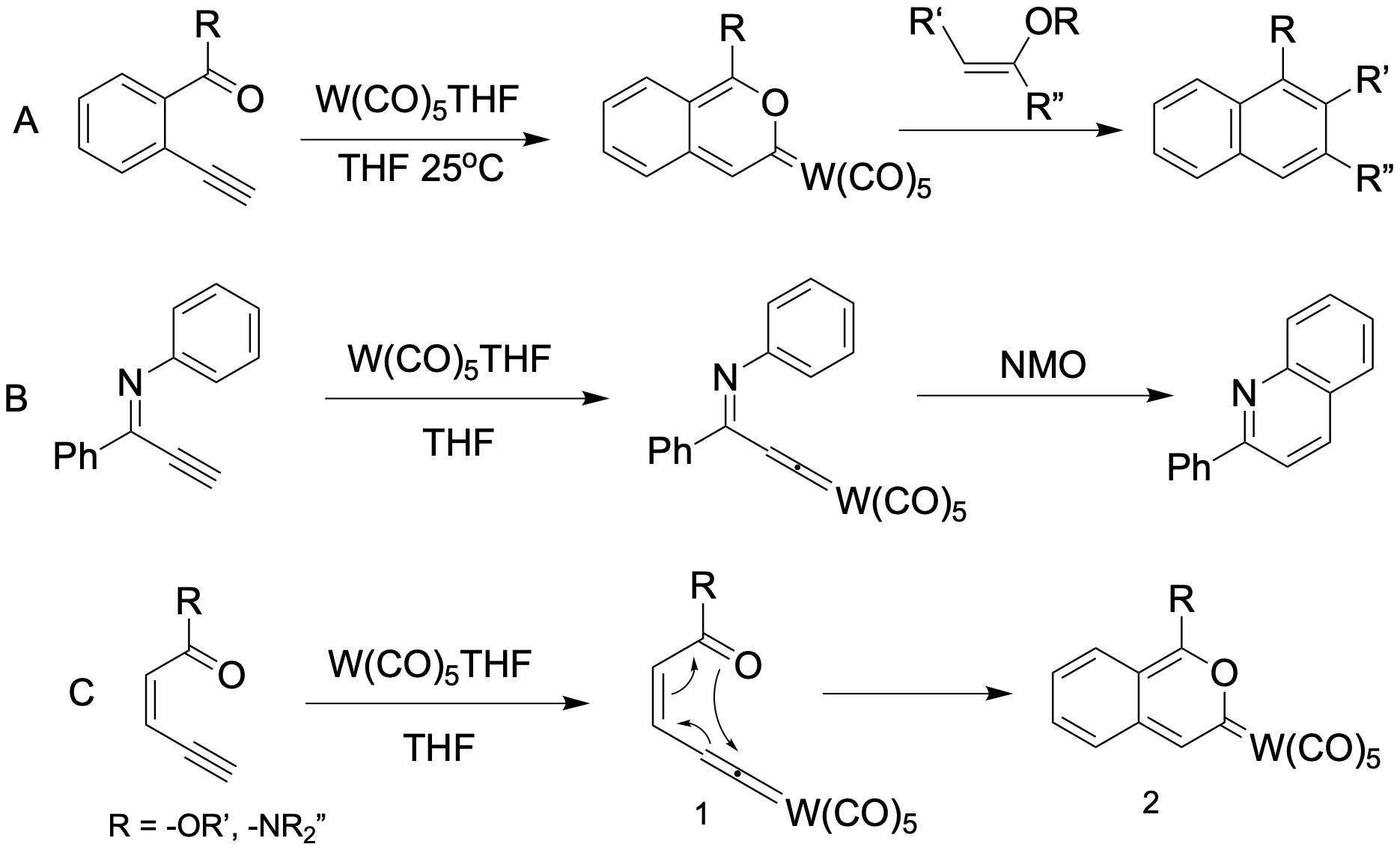
Figure 6: A) Diels–Alder reaction–retro-Diels–Alder sequence to form substituted naphthalene from o-ethynylaryl carbonyl via cyclic fischer carbene complexes, B) Vinylidene complex formation from (thf)W(CO)_{5} and ethynylimines instigates electrocyclization to afford 2-arylquinolines after oxidative demetallation, C) Formation of Pyranylidene-Metal Complex (2) from a Vinylidene-Metal Intermediate (1) via [4 + 2] Cycloaddition Reactions.

==== Cycloisomerization and electrocyclization reactions ====
W(CO)_{5}(THF) is also highly effective in cycloisomerization reactions, particularly in 4-alkyn-1-ol systems (Figure 7). Here, the tungsten center coordinates to the alkyne, guiding the regioselective rearrangement of the substrate into a cyclic ether or lactone. This transformation is valuable for synthesizing oxygenated heterocycles with structural complexity. Additionally, W(CO)_{5}(THF) facilitates electrocyclization processes. In these reactions, the tungsten-bound alkyne undergoes pericyclic ring closure, forming cyclic products via a concerted mechanism. The role of tungsten is to stabilize key reaction carbene intermediates and modulate the electronic properties of the reacting system, ensuring high efficiency and selectivity.

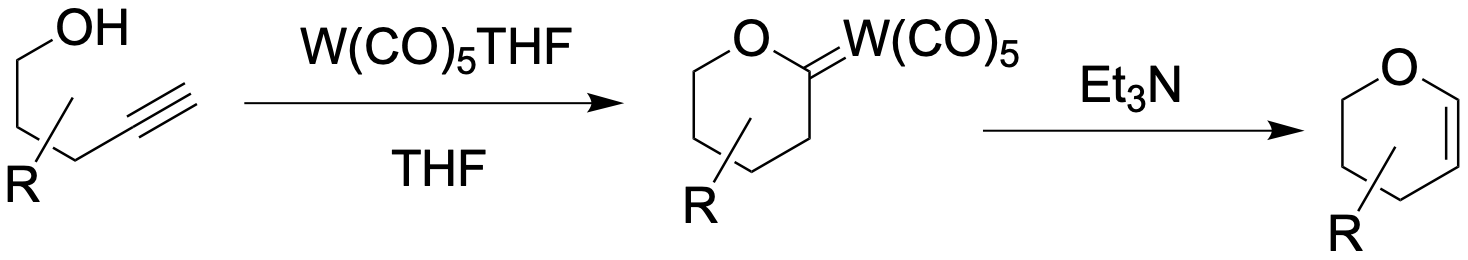
Figure 7: (THF)W(CO)_{5} -promoted endo-cycloisomerization reaction of substituted 4-alkyn-1-ol derivatives.

=== Ligand substitution in W(CO)_{5}(THF) ===
The labile THF ligand in W(CO)_{5}(THF) makes it highly reactive in ligand substitution reactions, allowing a variety of ligands to coordinate to the tungsten center (Scheme 3). Carbene ligands can replace THF to form carbene-tungsten complexes, which are valuable not only in general catalysis but also in olefin metathesis, cyclopropanation, and Fischer-Tropsch chemistry, enabling C–C bond formation and selective functionalization. Similarly, phosphines (PR_{3}) readily substitute THF, tuning the electronic and steric properties of the complex for catalytic applications by increasing π-backdonation, altering CO ligand strength, and controlling ligand exchange and reaction selectivity. The tungsten center also accommodates anionic ligands. Furthermore, low-valent main-group organometallic compounds (e.g., Si, Sn, Sb, Bi) and transition metals can coordinate to tungsten by replacing THF, forming heterobimetallic or heteronuclear complexes that exhibit σ-donation and d–d interactions, significantly influencing electronic properties. This versatility in ligand substitution expands the utility of W(CO)_{5}(THF) in organometallic chemistry and catalysis.

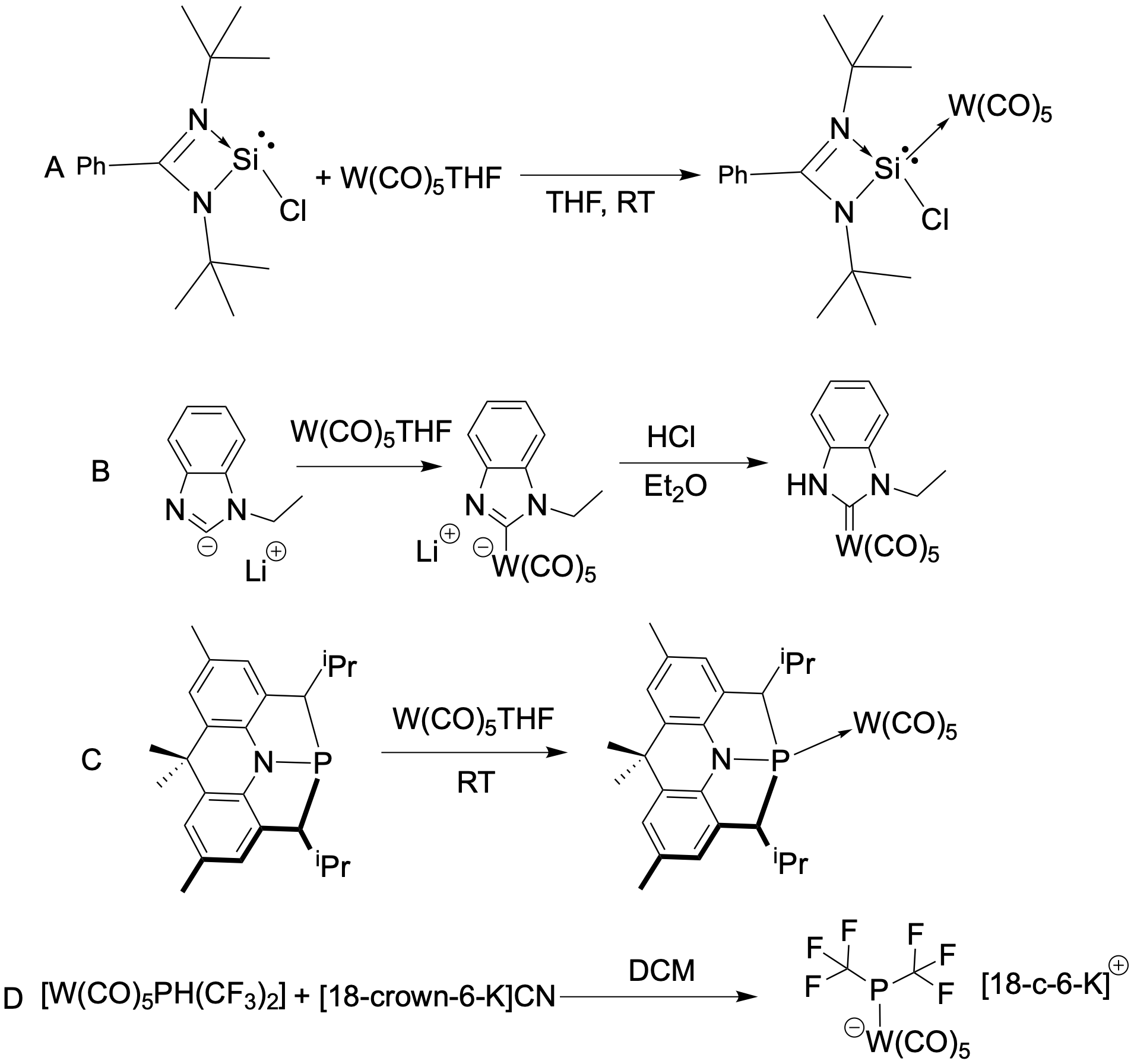
Figure 8: Ligand Substitution in W(CO)_{5}(THF) with Silylene (A), N-Heterocyclic Carbene (B), Phosphine (C), and Anionic Phosphine Ligand (D)
