= Tantalum pentoxide =

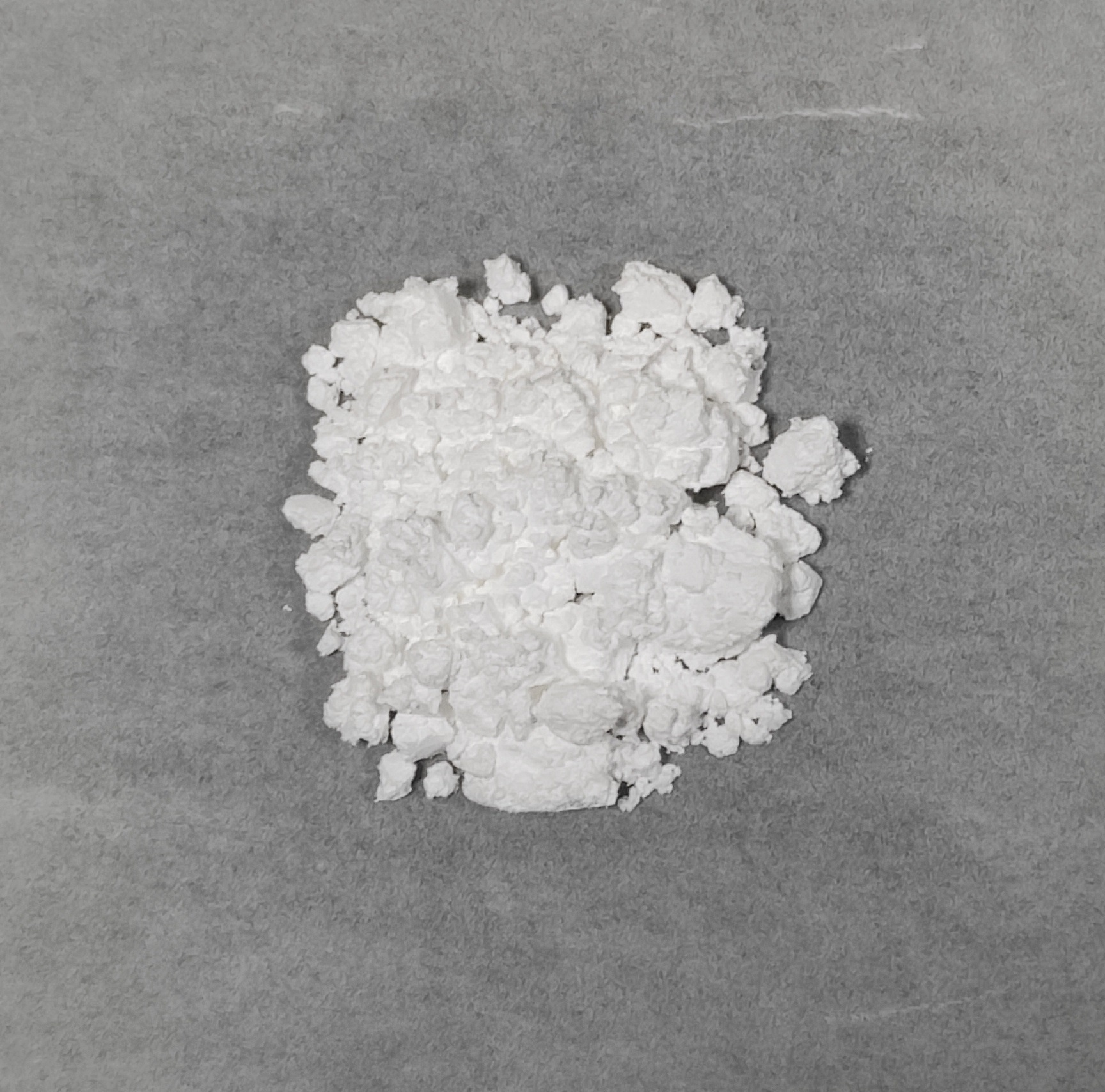

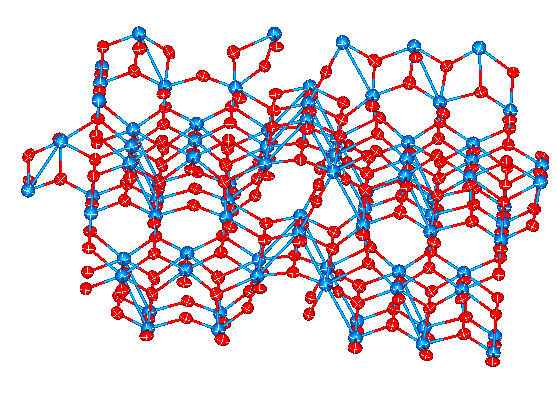

Names
- IUPAC name Tantalum(V) oxide
- Systematic IUPAC name Ditantalum pentaoxide

Identifiers
CAS Number	1314-61-0
3D model (JSmol)	Interactive image
ChemSpider	452513
ECHA InfoCard	100.013.854
PubChem CID	518712
UNII	OEZ64Z53M4
CompTox Dashboard (EPA)	DTXSID10893849
- InChI: InChI=1S/5O.2Ta
- SMILES: O=[Ta](=O)O[Ta](=O)=O

Properties
Chemical formula	Ta_{2}O_{5}
Molar mass	441.893 g/mol
Appearance	white, odorless powder
Density	β-Ta_{2}O_{5} = 8.18 g/cm^{3} α-Ta_{2}O_{5} = 8.37 g/cm^{3}
Melting point	1,872 °C (3,402 °F; 2,145 K)
Solubility in water	negligible
Solubility	insoluble in organic solvents and most mineral acids, reacts with HF
Band gap	3.8–5.3 eV
Magnetic susceptibility (χ)	−32.0×10^{−6} cm^{3}/mol
Refractive index (n_{D})	2.275
- Except where otherwise noted, data are given for materials in their standard state (at 25 °C [77 °F], 100 kPa). verify (what is ?) Infobox references

Tantalum pentoxide, also known as tantalum(V) oxide, is the inorganic compound with the formula Ta_{2}O_{5}. It is a white solid that is insoluble in all solvents but is attacked by strong bases and hydrofluoric acid. Ta_{2}O_{5} is an inert material with a high refractive index and low absorption (i.e. colourless), which makes it useful for coatings. It is also extensively used in the production of capacitors, due to its high dielectric constant.

== Preparation ==
=== From ores ===
Tantalum is extracted from its ores, typically tantalite and columbite, by hydrometallurgy. The process begins with a leaching step; in which the ore is treated with hydrofluoric acid and sulfuric acid to produce water-soluble hydrogen fluorides, such as the heptafluorotantalate. This allows the Ta and Nb to be separated from the impurities in the rock. An idealized equation for the process is:

MTa_{2}O_{6} + 16 HF → 2 H_{2}[TaF_{7}] + MF_{2} + 6 H_{2}O (M = Ca, Fe, Mn, etc)

The tantalum and niobium hydrogenfluorides are then removed from the aqueous solution by liquid-liquid extraction into organic solvents, such as cyclohexanone or methyl isobutyl ketone. This step allows the simple removal of various metal impurities (e.g. iron and manganese) which remain in the aqueous phase in the form of fluorides. Separation of the tantalum and niobium is then achieved by pH adjustment. Niobium requires a higher level of acidity to remain soluble in the organic phase and can hence be selectively removed by extraction into less acidic water. The tantalum hydrogen fluoride solution is then neutralised with aqueous ammonia to give hydrated tantalum oxide (Ta_{2}O_{5}(H_{2}O)_{x}), which is calcinated to tantalum pentoxide (Ta_{2}O_{5}) as described in these idealized equations:

H_{2}[TaF_{7}] + 5 H_{2}O + 7 NH_{3} → 1/2 Ta_{2}O_{5}(H_{2}O)_{5} + 7 NH_{4}F
Ta_{2}O_{5}(H_{2}O)_{5} → Ta_{2}O_{5} + 5 H_{2}O

Natural pure tantalum oxide is known as the mineral tantite, although it is exceedingly rare.

=== From alkoxides ===
Tantalum oxide is frequently used in electronics, often in the form of thin films. For these applications it can be produced by MOCVD (or related techniques), which involves the hydrolysis of its volatile halides or alkoxides:

Ta_{2}(OEt)_{10} + 5 H_{2}O → Ta_{2}O_{5} + 10 EtOH
2 TaCl_{5} + 5 H_{2}O → Ta_{2}O_{5} + 10 HCl

== Structure and properties ==
The crystal structure of tantalum pentoxide has been the matter of some debate. The bulk material is disordered, being either amorphous or polycrystalline; with single crystals being difficult to grow. As such Xray crystallography has largely been limited to powder diffraction, which provides less structural information.

At least 2 polymorphs are known to exist. A low temperature form, known as L- or β-Ta_{2}O_{5}, and the high temperature form known as H- or α-Ta_{2}O_{5}. The transition between these two forms is slow and reversible; taking place between 1000 and 1360 °C, with a mixture of structures existing at intermediate temperatures. The structures of both polymorphs consist of chains built from octahedral TaO_{6} and pentagonal bipyramidal TaO_{7} polyhedra sharing opposite vertices; which are further joined by edge-sharing. The overall crystal system is orthorhombic in both cases, with the space group of β-Ta_{2}O_{5} being identified as Pna2 by single crystal X-ray diffraction.

A high pressure form (Z-Ta_{2}O_{5}) has also been reported, in which the Ta atoms adopt a 7 coordinate geometry to give a monoclinic structure (space group C2).

Purely amorphous tantalum pentoxide has a similar local structure to the crystalline polymorphs, built from TaO_{6} and TaO_{7} polyhedra, while the molten liquid phase has a distinct structure based on lower coordination polyhedra, mainly TaO_{5} and TaO_{6}.

The difficulty in forming material with a uniform structure has led to variations in its reported properties. Like many metal oxides Ta_{2}O_{5} is an insulator and its band gap has variously been reported as being between 3.8 and 5.3 eV, depending on the method of manufacture. In general the more amorphous the material the greater its observed band gap. These observed values are significantly higher than those predicted by computational chemistry (2.3 - 3.8 eV).

Its dielectric constant is typically about 25 although values of over 50 have been reported. In general tantalum pentoxide is considered to be a high-κ dielectric material.

== Reactions ==
Ta_{2}O_{5} does not react appreciably with either HCl or HBr, however it will dissolve in hydrofluoric acid, and reacts with potassium bifluoride and HF according to the following equation:

Ta_{2}O_{5} + 4 KHF_{2} + 6 HF → 2 K_{2}[TaF_{7}] + 5 H_{2}O

Ta_{2}O_{5} can be reduced to metallic Ta via the use of metallic reductants such as calcium and aluminium.

Ta_{2}O_{5} + 5 Ca → 2 Ta + 5 CaO

=== Surface chemistry ===
In aqueous suspension, the surface of Ta_{2}O_{5} is amphoteric and its net surface charge depends on pH. Reported values of the point of zero charge (PZC) and isoelectric point (IEP) are scattered but consistently acidic: zeta potential measurements on thin films gave an isoelectric point between pH 2.7 and 3.0, capacitance–voltage measurements on insulator surfaces gave a pH_{pzc} of 2.8 ± 0.3, while potentiometric titration of Ta_{2}O_{5} powder gave a pristine point of zero charge at pH 5.2 (IEP 5.3), with most other literature values falling at considerably lower pH. Consequently, in neutral or near-neutral aqueous solutions the Ta_{2}O_{5} surface carries a net negative charge.

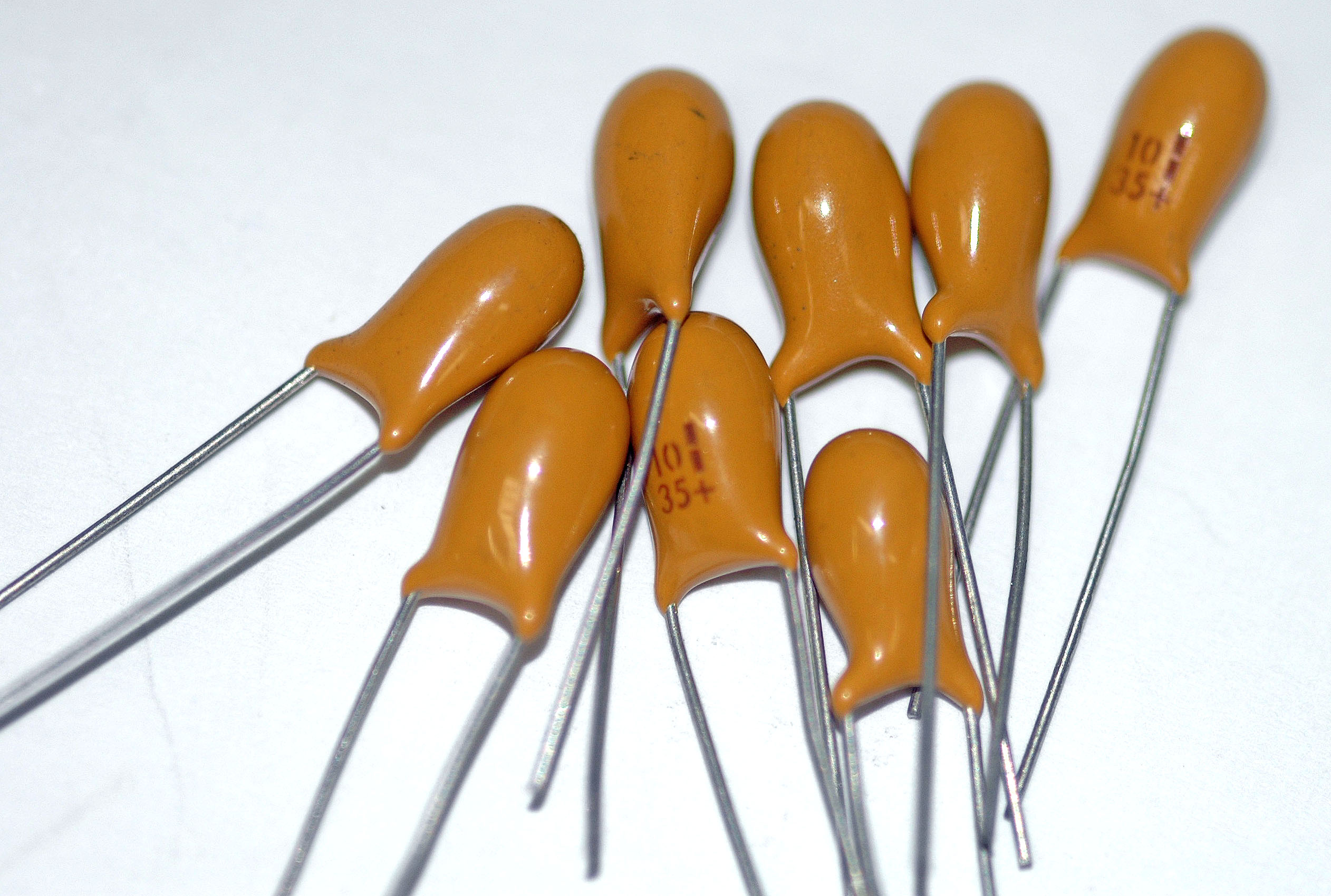
Several 10 μF × 30 V DC rated tantalum capacitors, solid-bodied epoxy-dipped type. Polarity is explicitly marked.

== Uses ==
=== In electronics ===
Owing to its high band gap and dielectric constant, tantalum pentoxide has found a variety of uses in electronics, particularly in tantalum capacitors. These are used in automotive electronics, cell phones, and pagers, electronic circuitry; thin-film components; and high-speed tools. In the 1990s, interest grew in the use of tantalum oxide as a high-κ dielectric for DRAM capacitor applications.

It is used in on-chip metal-insulator-metal capacitors for high frequency CMOS integrated circuits. Tantalum oxide may have applications as the charge trapping layer for non-volatile memories. There are applications of tantalum oxide in resistive switching memories.

=== In optics ===
Due to its high refractive index, Ta_{2}O_{5} has been utilized in the fabrication of the glass of photographic lenses. It can also be deposited as an optical coating with typical applications being antireflection and multilayer filter coatings in near UV to near infrared.

Ta_{2}O_{5} has also been found to have a high nonlinear refractive index, on the order of three times that of silicon nitride, which has led to interest in the utilization of Ta_{2}O_{5} in photonic integrated circuits. Ta_{2}O_{5} has been recently utilized as the material platform for the generation of supercontinuum and Kerr frequency combs in waveguides and optical ring resonators. Through the addition of rare-earth dopants in the deposition process, Ta_{2}O_{5} waveguide lasers have been presented for a variety of applications, such as remote sensing and LiDAR.
