= Triple bond =

Chemical bond involving six bonding electrons; one sigma plus two pi bonds

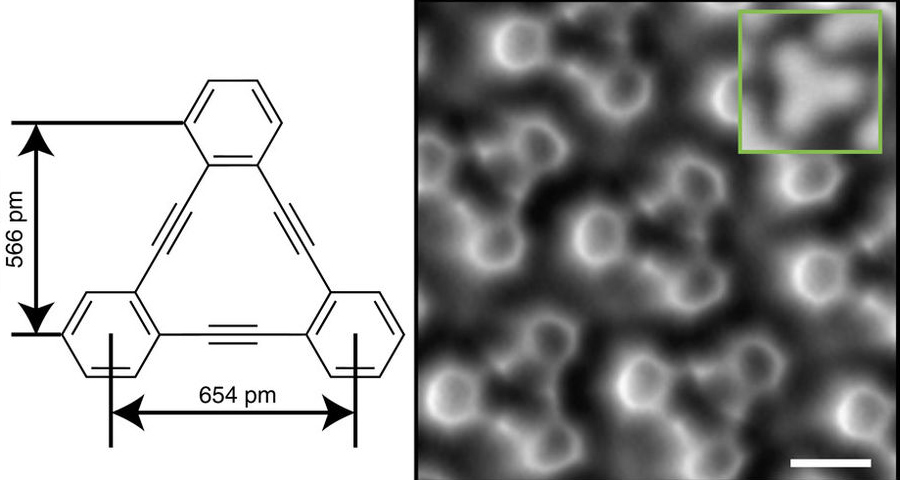
Structure and AFM image of dehydrobenzo[12]annulene, where benzene rings are held together by triple bonds

A triple bond in chemistry is a chemical bond between two atoms involving six bonding electrons instead of the usual two in a covalent single bond. Triple bonds are stronger than the equivalent single bonds or double bonds, with a bond order of three. The most common triple bond is in a nitrogen N_{2} molecule; the second most common is that between two carbon atoms, which can be found in alkynes. Other functional groups containing a triple bond are cyanides and isocyanides. Some diatomic molecules, such as diphosphorus and carbon monoxide, are also triple bonded. In skeletal formulae the triple bond is drawn as three parallel lines (≡) between the two connected atoms.

Chemical compounds with triple bond(s)
acetylene, H−C≡C−H	cyanogen, N≡C−C≡N	carbon monoxide, C≡O

== Bonding ==
Triple bonding can be explained in terms of orbital hybridization. In the case of acetylene, each carbon atom has two sp-orbitals and two p-orbitals. The two sp-orbitals are linear, with 180° bond angles, and occupy the x-axis in the cartesian coordinate system. The p-orbitals are perpendicular to the sp-orbitals on the y-axis and the z-axis. When the atoms approach each other, the sp orbitals overlap to form an sp-sp sigma bond. At the same time the p_{z}-orbitals approach and together they form a p_{z}-p_{z} pi-bond. Likewise, the other pair of p_{y}-orbitals form a p_{y}-p_{y} pi-bond. The result is formation of one sigma bond and two pi bonds. However, with heavy enough atoms, relativistic effects comes into play and one ends up, not with pure sigma and pi bonds for the three bonds, but rather hybridizations of sigma and pi bonds.

In the bent bond model, the triple bond can also formed by the overlapping of three sp^{3} lobes without the need to invoke a pi-bond.

== Triple bonds between elements heavier than oxygen ==
Structure of hexa(tert-butoxy)ditungsten(III), an example of a metal-metal triple bond

Many elements beyond oxygen can form triple bonds. These bonds are common in some transition metals. Hexa(tert-butoxy)ditungsten(III) and Hexa(tert-butoxy)dimolybdenum(III) are well known examples, in which the metal-metal bond distance is about 233 pm. The former has attracted particular attention for its reactions with alkynes, leading to metal-carbon triple bonded compounds of the formula RC≡W(OBut)_{3}

Additionally, phosphorus can exist as the highly reactive diatomic molecule diphosphorus, which has roughly half the bond-dissociation energy of dinitrogen.
