= Hexa(tert-butoxy)dimolybdenum(III) =

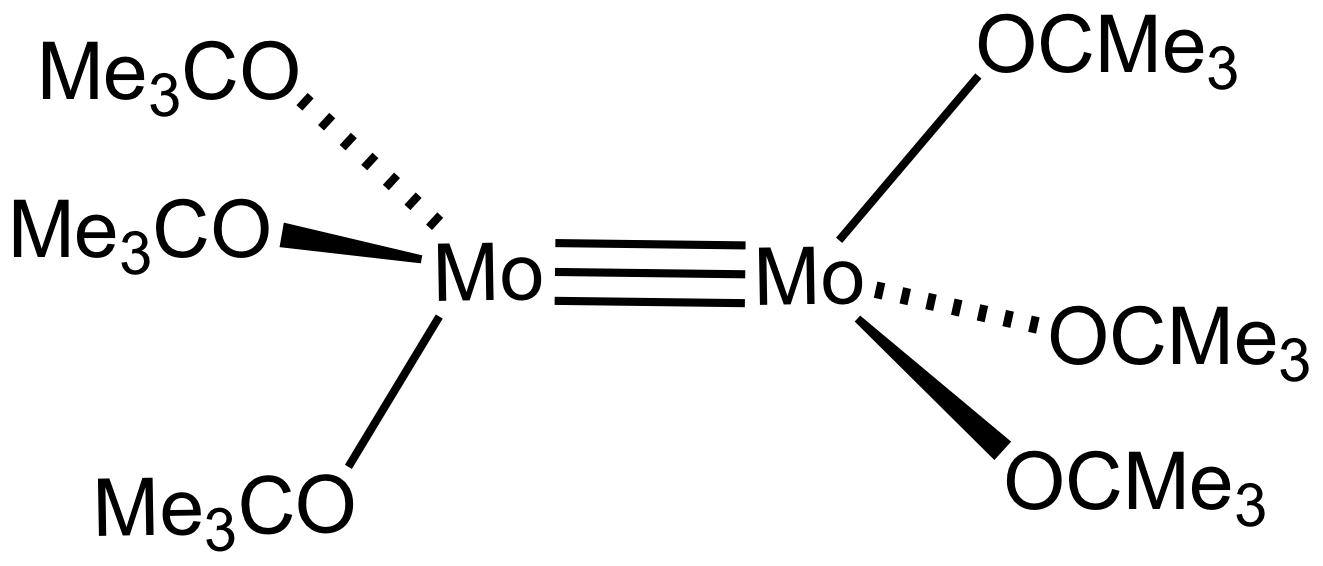

Identifiers
CAS Number	51956-21-9
3D model (JSmol)	Interactive image
ChemSpider	129557724
PubChem CID	163189339
CompTox Dashboard (EPA)	DTXSID001336555
- InChI: InChI=1S/6C4H9O.2Mo/c6*1-4(2,3)5;;/h6*1-3H3;;/q6*-1;2*+3 Key: ZOGMSHNHMHVRRN-UHFFFAOYSA-N
- SMILES: CC(C)(C)O[Mo](#[Mo](OC(C)(C)C)(OC(C)(C)C)OC(C)(C)C)(OC(C)(C)C)OC(C)(C)C

Properties
Chemical formula	C_{24}H_{54}Mo_{2}O_{6}
Molar mass	630.59 g·mol^{−1}
Appearance	orange solid
- Except where otherwise noted, data are given for materials in their standard state (at 25 °C [77 °F], 100 kPa). Infobox references

Hexa(tert-butoxy)dimolybdenum(III) is a coordination complex of molybdenum(III). It is one of the homoleptic alkoxides of molybdenum. An orange, air-sensitive solid, the complex has attracted academic attention as the precursor to many organomolybdenum derivatives. It an example of a charge-neutral complex featuring a molybdenum to molybdenum triple bond (Mo≡Mo), arising from the coupling of a pair of d^{3} metal centers. It can be prepared by a salt metathesis reaction from the THF complex of molybdenum trichloride and lithium tert-butoxide:

2 MoCl_{3}(thf)_{3} + 6 LiOBu-t → Mo_{2}(OBu-t)_{6} + 6 LiCl + 6 thf

The complex and its ditungsten (W_{2}) analogue adopt an ethane-like geometry. The metal to metal bond distance is 222 pm in the related complex Mo_{2}(OCH_{2}CMe_{3})_{6}.

== See also ==
- Hexa(tert-butoxy)ditungsten(III)
