= Potassium tert-butoxide =

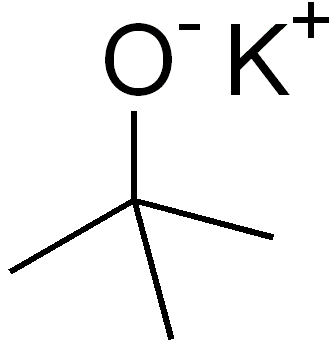
Skeletal formula of potassium tert-butoxide
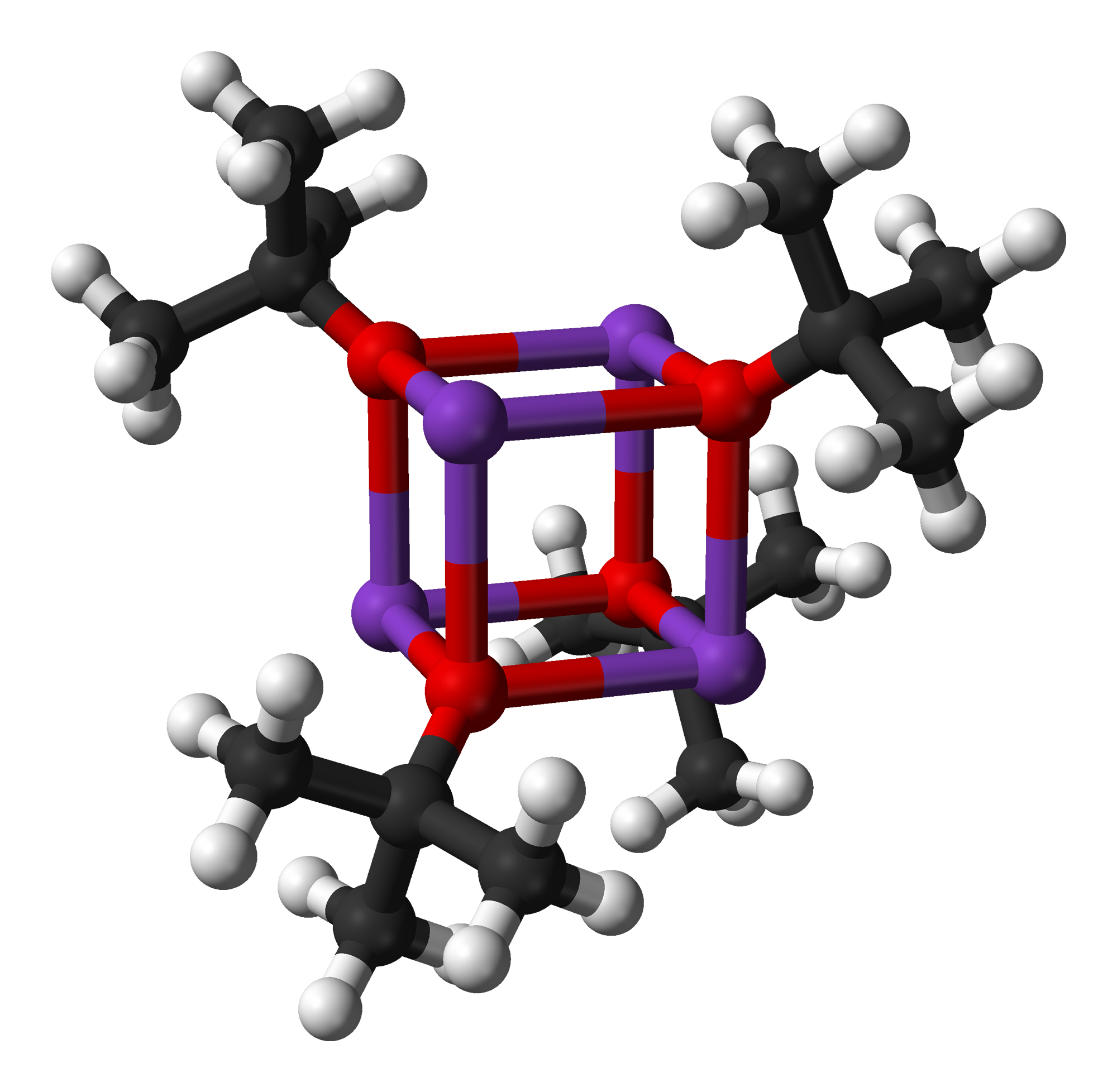
Ball-and-stick model of the cubane tetramer that potassium tert-butoxide adopts in
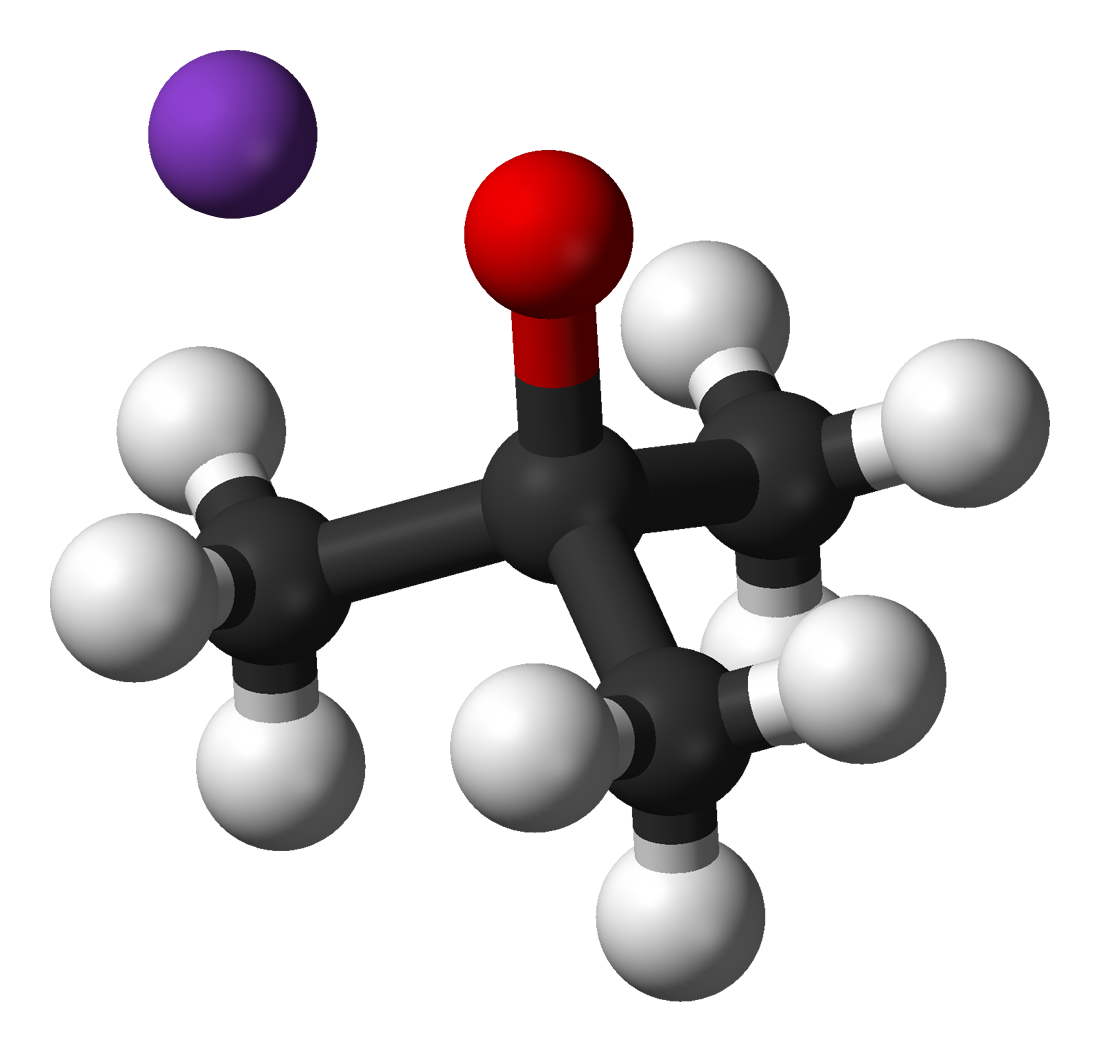

Names
- Preferred IUPAC name Potassium tert-butoxide
- Other names KOt-Bu, potassium t-butoxide.

Identifiers
CAS Number	865-47-4
3D model (JSmol)	Interactive image
Abbreviations	t-BuOK tBuOK^{t}BuOK; Me_{3}COK
ChemSpider	63266
ECHA InfoCard	100.011.583
PubChem CID	23665647
UNII	VR838VHE0V
CompTox Dashboard (EPA)	DTXSID2061220
- InChI: InChI=1S/C4H9O.K/c1-4(2,3)5;/h1-3H3;/q-1;+1 Key: LPNYRYFBWFDTMA-UHFFFAOYSA-N; InChI=1/C4H9O.K/c1-4(2,3)5;/h1-3H3;/q-1;+1 Key: LPNYRYFBWFDTMA-UHFFFAOYAU
- SMILES: [K+].[O-]C(C)(C)C

Properties
Chemical formula	C_{4}H_{9}KO
Molar mass	112.213 g·mol^{−1}
Appearance	colourless solid
Melting point	256 °C (493 °F; 529 K)
Boiling point	sublimes at 220 °C (1 mmHg) or at 140 °C (0.01 hPa)
Solubility in water	Reacts with water
Solubility in diethyl ether	4.34 g/100 g (25-26 °C)
Solubility in Hexane	0.27 g/100 g (25-26 °C)
Solubility in Toluene	2.27 g/100 g (25-26 °C)
Solubility in THF	25.00 g/100 g (25-26 °C)

Hazards
- GHS labelling
Pictograms	(GHS02: Flammable) (GHS05: Corrosive)
Signal word	Danger
Hazard statements	H228, H252, H314
Precautionary statements	P405
Safety data sheet (SDS)	Oxford MSDS
- Except where otherwise noted, data are given for materials in their standard state (at 25 °C [77 °F], 100 kPa). verify (what is ?) Infobox references

Potassium tert-butoxide (or potassium t-butoxide) is a chemical compound with the formula [(CH_{3})_{3}COK]_{n} (abbr. KOtBu). This colourless solid is a strong base (pKa of conjugate acid is 17 in H_{2}O), which is useful in organic synthesis. The compound is often depicted as a salt, and it often behaves as such, but its ionization depends on the solvent.

== Preparation ==
Potassium t-butoxide is commercially available as a solution and as a solid, but it is often generated in situ for laboratory use because samples are so moisture-sensitive and older samples are often of low purity. It is prepared by the reaction of dry tert-butyl alcohol with potassium metal. The solid is obtained by evaporating these solutions followed by heating the solid. The solid can be purified by sublimation.

== Structure ==
It crystallizes as a tetrameric cubane-type cluster. It crystallises from tetrahydrofuran/pentane at −20 °C as [tBuOK·tBuOH]_{∞}, which consists of straight chains linked by hydrogen bonding. Sublimation of [tBuOK·tBuOH]_{∞} affords the tetramer [tBuOK]_{4}, which adopts a cubane-like structure. Mildly Lewis basic solvents such as THF and diethyl ether do not break up the tetrameric structure, which persists in the solid, in solution and even in the gas phase.

== Reactions ==
=== As a base ===
Many modifications have been reported that influence the reactivity of this reagent. The compound adopts a complex cluster structure (the adjacent picture is a simplified cartoon), and additives that modify the cluster affect the reactivity of the reagent. For example, DMF, DMSO, hexamethylphosphoramide (HMPA), and 18-crown-6 interact with the potassium center, yielding solvent separated ion pairs such as K(DMSO)_{x}^{+} and tert-BuO^{−}. Whereas in benzene, on the other hand, the compound remains as a cluster structure, which is less basic. Even in polar solvents, it is not as strong as amide bases, e.g., lithium diisopropylamide, but stronger than potassium hydroxide. Its steric bulk inhibits the group from participating in nucleophilic addition, such as in a Williamson ether synthesis or related S_{N}2 reactions.

Substrates that are deprotonated by potassium t-butoxide include terminal acetylenes and active methylene compounds. It is useful in dehydrohalogenation reactions. Illustrating the latter behavior, potassium tert-butoxide reacts with chloroform yielding dichlorocarbene, which is useful for dichlorocyclopropanations. Potassium tert-butoxide can abstract a beta-proton from alkylammonium cations, leading to the Hofmann product via an elimination reaction.

=== Other reactions ===
Potassium tert-butoxide catalyzes the reaction of hydrosilanes and heterocyclic compounds to give the silyl derivatives, with release of H_{2}.

== Safety ==
Potassium tert-butoxide is a very strong base that rapidly attacks living tissue.

Potassium tert-butoxide forms explosive mixtures when treated with dichloromethane.

== Related compounds ==
- Sodium tert-butoxide
- Lithium tert-butoxide
