= Lithium tert-butoxide =

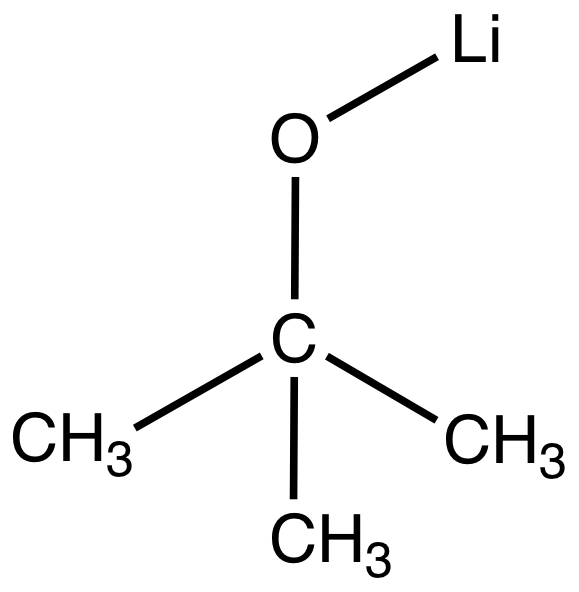

Names
- Preferred IUPAC name Lithium tert-butoxide

Identifiers
CAS Number	1907-33-1
3D model (JSmol)	Interactive image
Abbreviations	t-BuOLi tBuOLi^{t}BuOLi; Me_{3}COLi
ChemSpider	108193
ECHA InfoCard	100.016.011
EC Number	217-611-5
PubChem CID	23664764
CompTox Dashboard (EPA)	DTXSID9051828
- InChI: InChI=1S/C4H9O.Li/c1-4(2,3)5;/h1-3H3;/q-1;+1 Key: LZWQNOHZMQIFBX-UHFFFAOYSA-N
- SMILES: [Li+].CC(C)(C)[O-]

Properties
Chemical formula	C_{4}H_{9}LiO
Molar mass	80.06 g·mol^{−1}
Appearance	white solid
Density	0.918 g/cm^{3} (hexamer)

Hazards
- Occupational safety and health (OHS/OSH)
Main hazards	strong base
- GHS labelling
Pictograms	(GHS02: Flammable) (GHS05: Corrosive) (GHS07: Exclamation mark)
Signal word	Danger
Hazard statements	H228, H251, H302, H314
Precautionary statements	P210, P235+P410, P240, P241, P260, P264, P270, P280, P301+P312, P301+P330+P331, P303+P361+P353, P304+P340, P305+P351+P338, P310, P321, P330, P363, P370+P378, P405, P407, P413, P420, P501
- Except where otherwise noted, data are given for materials in their standard state (at 25 °C [77 °F], 100 kPa). Infobox references

Lithium tert-butoxide is the metalorganic compound with the formula LiOC(CH_{3})_{3}. A white solid, it is used as a strong base in organic synthesis. The compound is often depicted as a salt, and it often behaves as such, but it is not ionized in solution. Both octameric and hexameric forms have been characterized by X-ray crystallography.

== Preparation ==
Lithium tert-butoxide is commercially available as a solution and as a solid, but it is often generated in situ for laboratory use because samples are so sensitive and older samples are often of poor quality. It can be obtained by treating tert-butanol with butyl lithium.

== Reactions ==
As a strong base, lithium tert-butoxide is easily protonated.

Lithium tert-butoxide is used to prepare other tert-butoxide compounds such as copper(I) t-butoxide and hexa(tert-butoxy)dimolybdenum(III):

2 MoCl_{3}(thf)_{3} + 6 LiOBu-t → Mo_{2}(OBu-t)_{6} + 6 LiCl + 6 thf

== Related compounds ==
- Sodium tert-butoxide
- Potassium tert-butoxide
