= Hexa(tert-butoxy)ditungsten(III) =

Names
- IUPAC name Hexa(tert-butoxy)ditungsten(III)

Identifiers
CAS Number	57125-20-9
3D model (JSmol)	Interactive image
ChemSpider	26567629
PubChem CID	13634733
CompTox Dashboard (EPA)	DTXSID701336556
- InChI: InChI=1S/6C4H9O.2W/c6*1-4(2,3)5;;/h6*1-3H3;;/q6*-1;2*+3 Key: YKZVERBZIZOWIZ-UHFFFAOYSA-N
- SMILES: CC(C)(C)O[W](#[W](OC(C)(C)C)(OC(C)(C)C)OC(C)(C)C)(OC(C)(C)C)OC(C)(C)C

Properties
Chemical formula	C_{24}H_{54}O_{6}W_{2}
Molar mass	806.37 g·mol^{−1}
Appearance	red solid
Density	1.651 g/cm^{3}
- Except where otherwise noted, data are given for materials in their standard state (at 25 °C [77 °F], 100 kPa). Infobox references

Hexa(tert-butoxy)ditungsten(III) is a coordination complex of tungsten(III). It is one of the homoleptic alkoxides of tungsten. A red, air-sensitive solid, the complex has attracted academic attention as the precursor to many organotungsten derivatives. It an example of a charge-neutral complex featuring a W≡W bond, arising from the coupling of a pair of d^{3} metal centers.

== Preparation ==
W_{2}(O-t-Bu)_{6} was first prepared by treating tungsten(III) dialkylamides with tert-butanol.

W_{2}(O-t-Bu)_{6} can also be synthesized from NaW_{2}Cl_{7}(THF)_{5} and NaO-t-Bu.

NaW_{2}Cl_{7}(THF)_{5} + 6 NaO-t-Bu → W_{2}(O-t-Bu)_{6} + 7 NaCl + 5 THF

== Structure ==
As verified by X-ray crystallography, the two tungsten(III) centers are joined by a triple bond. Each W(III) is pseudotetrahedral. The W_{2}O_{6} core adopts a staggered, ethane-like conformation, similar to that for its dimolybdenum analogue. The molecule has inversion symmetry.

== Reactions ==
=== Hydrolysis ===
This compound hydrolyzes at 200 °C to give WO_{2}:

W_{2}(O−t−Bu)_{6} + 2 H_{2}O → 2 WO_{2} + 4 HO−t−Bu + 2 CH_{2}=C(CH_{3})_{2}

=== With carbon dioxide ===
Carbon dioxide reacts reversibly with W_{2}(O−t−Bu)_{6} to form green 2:1 adduct featuring two alkyl carbonate ligands.

W_{2}(O−t−Bu)_{6} + 2 CO_{2} ⇌ W_{2}(O−t−Bu)_{4}(O_{2}CO−t−Bu)_{2}

=== With carbon monoxide ===
Carbon monoxide react with W_{2}(O−t−Bu)_{6} to give W_{2}(O−t−Bu)_{6}CO. In this adduct, the carbonyl ligand bridges between two W(III) atoms.. This compound can further react with i-PrOH to generate W_{4}(μ-CO)_{2}(O-i-Pr)_{12}. The higher nuclearity of this isopropoxide can be attributed to the smaller size of the isopropoxyl ligands.

=== With alkynes ===
W_{2}(O−t−Bu)_{6} reacts with alkynes to give RC≡W(O-t-Bu)_{3}, tetrahedral alkylidyne complexes. In these complexes, tungsten is electrophilic and the alkylidyne carbon is nucleophilic.

W_{2}(O−t−Bu)_{6} + RC≡CR → 2 RC≡W(O−t−Bu)_{3} (R can be Me, Et, Pr)

The reaction proceed in minutes near room temperature. The rate increases in the following order: 4-octyne, 3-hexyne, 2-butyne. The resulting alkylidyne compounds are colorless solids that sublime near room temperature. W_{2}(O−t−Bu)_{6} does not react with diphenylacetylene or bis(trimethylsilyl)acetylene. These results are attributed to unfavorable electronic and steric effects, respectively. On the other hand, W_{2}(O−t−Bu)_{6} reacts with two equivalents of EtC≡CPh, EtC≡CSiMe_{3}, and EtC≡C–CH=CH_{2} to form corresponding alkylidyne complexes. Thus, W_{2}(O−t−Bu)_{6} reacts more easily with asymmetric substitute acetylenes than symmetric ones.

The reactions with alkynes initially afford adducts with a bridging ("μ-perpendicular") alkyne with elongated WW bonds and CC (alkyne) bonds. This intermediate is analogue to other dimetallatetrahedranes. These adducts convert into RC≡W(O-t-Bu)_{3}. The resulting alkylidyne complexes RC≡W(O-t-Bu)_{3} catalyze alkyne metathesis reactions.

Besides simple metathesis reactions, W_{2}(O-t-Bu)_{6} also reacts with 3-hexyne in a 1:1 molar ratio to form a triangular tritungsten complex compound [W_{3}(O-t-Bu)_{5}(μ-O)(μ-CEt)O]_{2}. This reaction has a two steps mechanism; first is the C≡C and W≡W metathesis reaction and follow by formal addition of carbyne (W≡C) to alkoxide (W_{2}):

W_{2}(O-t-Bu)_{6} + RC≡CR → 2[RC≡W(O-t-Bu)_{3}]

W_{2}(O−t−Bu)_{6} + RC≡W(O−t−Bu)_{3} → W_{3}(O−t−Bu)_{5}(μ−O)(μ−CEt)O

W_{3}(O−t−Bu)_{5}(μ−O)(μ−CEt)O → [W_{3}(O−t−Bu)_{5}(μ−O)(μ−CEt)O]_{2}

W_{2}(O−t−Bu)_{6} also reacts with EtC≡CC≡CEt to form (t-Bu-O)_{3}W≡CC≡W(O-t-Bu)_{3}:

W_{2}(O−t−Bu)_{6} + EtC≡CC≡CEt → (t−Bu−O)_{3}W≡CC≡W(O−t−Bu)_{3} + EtC≡CEt This compound, however, does not act as a metathesis catalyst.

W_{2}(O−t−Bu)_{6} also reacts with trans-Pt(C≡CH)_{2}(PMe_{2}Ph)_{2} to form (t-Bu-O)_{3}W≡C–C≡W(O-t-Bu)_{3} and trans-(PMe_{2}Ph)_{2}Pt[C_{2}W_{2}(O-t-Bu)_{5}]_{2}.

=== With nitriles ===
With excess amount of nitrile, N≡W(O-t-Bu)_{3} is formed along with RC≡CR. The reaction initially gives a 1:1 mixture of the alkylidyne RC≡W(O-t-Bu)_{3} and nitride N≡W(O-t-Bu)_{3}:

W_{2}(O−t−Bu)_{6} + RC≡N → RC≡W(O−t−Bu)_{3} + N≡W(O−t−Bu)_{3}

Although W_{2}(O-t-Bu)_{6} reacts with nitriles, it doesn’t react with nitrogen (N≡N).

When C≡C and C≡N bond both exist, W_{2}(O-t-Bu)_{6} reacts more rapidly with C≡N than C≡C bond. Here’s an example of W_{2}(O-t-Bu)_{6} reacting with EtC≡CCN in the presence of quinuclidine:

W_{2}(O−t−Bu)_{6} +EtC≡CCN + 12L → EtC≡CC≡W(O−t−Bu)_{3}L + N≡W(O−t−Bu)_{3}

On the other hand, the metathesis catalyst MeC≡W(O-t-Bu)_{3} reacts more rapidly with C≡C than C≡N bond. Similar reaction with EtC≡CCN and quinuclidine produce different product:

W_{2}(O−t−Bu)_{6} + EtC≡CCN + 12 L → NCC≡W(O−t−Bu)_{3}L + EtC≡CMe

=== With nitroso ===
W_{2}(O−t−Bu)_{6} and nitrosobenzene combine to give [W(O-t-Bu)_{2}(NPh)]_{2}(μ-O)(μ-O-t-Bu)_{2}. This reaction undergoes two oxidative additions to form W=N bonds. However, researchers couldn't figure out where the one missing oxygen went. This reaction is the first discovered reaction of a nitroso with metal multiple bonds.

=== With allenes ===
Allenes react with the ditungsten complex forming adducts, e.g.,

W_{2}(O−t−Bu)_{6} + H_{2}C=C=CH_{2} → W_{2}(O−t−Bu)_{6}(HC_{2}=C=CH_{2})

Further reaction with carbon monoxide was also demonstrated.

== See also ==
- Hexa(tert-butoxy)dimolybdenum(III)
