= Organotungsten chemistry =

Chemistry of compounds with W-C bonds

Organotungsten chemistry is the chemistry of chemical compounds with W-C bonds. It shares many similarities with organomolybdenum chemistry, while having more prevalent high oxidation states than the related organochromium chemistry. Notable applications include that in olefin/alkyne metathesis catalysis, and in arene activation. If the compound only has W-C bonds, is it, by definition, a form of tungsten carbide.

== Carbonyl & cyanide complexes ==
=== Carbonyl complexes ===
The simplest tungsten carbonyl complex is tungsten hexacarbonyl, most commonly prepared via reductive carbonylation (for instance, reaction of WCl_{6} and zinc powder under a CO atmosphere) of tungsten halides and similar compounds. Tungsten hexacarbonyl itself is able to catalyze alkene metathesis. Being volatile and easily decomposed, it is also widely used in the electron beam-induced deposition technique to deposit tungsten atoms. Reduction of the hexacarbonyl (in liquid ammonia with borohydride and sodium metal, respectively) yields the anionic carbonyl complexes [W_{2}(CO)_{10}]^{2-} & [W(CO)_{4}]^{4-}. Also known are the complexes [W(CO)_{5}]^{2-} & [W_{3}(CO)_{14}]^{2-}.

Substitution of the carbonyl ligand can be facilitated thermally or photochemically, for instance, the reaction with cyclopentadienide to yield [CpW(CO)_{3}]^{-}, which can be further derivatized. A roundabout substitution method of first using nitriles to displace the carbonyls and then displacing the nitriles is also viable. Alkane complexes of W(CO)_{5} can be photochemically produced. A niche catalysis reaction utilizes the strong Lewis acidity of the W(CO)_{5} fragment, converting thiirane to the sulfur analogs of crown ethers. The other common reactivity of alkyl/aryl containing tungsten carbonyl complexes involve carbonyl insertion.

=== Isocyanide and cyanide complexes ===
Isocyanide complexes W(CO)_{6-n}(CNR)_{n} (n = 1~3) are prepared via ligand substitution of tungsten hexacarbonyl, catalyzed by palladium oxide or cobalt dichloride. The reactivity regarding migratory insertion is analogous to that of carbonyl complexes.

Of the cyanide complexes, [W(CN)_{8}]^{n-} (n = 3, 4) are notable for their photochemical and magnetic properties. The face capped cubic cluster compound Mn_{9}[W(CN)_{8}]_{6}•24EtOH, for instance, has the largest known ground state spin value of S = 39/2 (as of 2011). Such complexes can also be used in constructing coordination polymers, such as {(Me_{3}Sn)_{4}[W(CN)_{8}]}_{n}. The coordination polymers are held together via cyanide bridges, with carbon coordinating the tungsten atoms while nitrogen coordinating the other central atoms.

== Hydrocarbyl complexes ==
=== Alkyl complexes ===
Simple alkyl complexes of tungsten, as those of molybdenum and chromium, are rather unstable. The simplest, hexamethyltungsten, has no molybdenum or chromium analogs. It is extremely reactive, detonating in air or even in vacuum. It is prepared with methylating reagents and WCl_{6}, and further methylation into [WMe_{7}]^{-} or [WMe8]^{2-} is possible when using methyllithium. Heteroatoms like oxygen can insert into the W-C bond, performing oxidation. WMe_{6} adopts the geometry of distorted trigonal prismatic, which may be attributed to a second-order Jahn-Teller distortion (for further details, see the article on hexamethyltungsten).

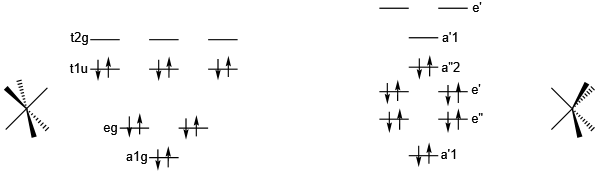
The molecular orbit explanation for the distortion of octahedral complexes into trigonal prismatic complexes. Note that WMe_{6} is further distorted, having three long W-C bonds and three short ones.

Stabilization of these compounds are possible via dimerization, as in the compound (Me_{3}SiCH_{2})_{3}W≡W(CH_{2}SiMe_{3})_{3}. Note that lack of beta hydrogen atoms are necessary to prevent beta-elimination. Neutral mononuclear complexes of different alkyl numbers are known, such as tetrabenzyltungsten (W(CH_{2}Ph)_{4}).

For electron deficient alkyl tungsten complexes, one example that demonstrates their bonding interactions and reactivity is shown below:

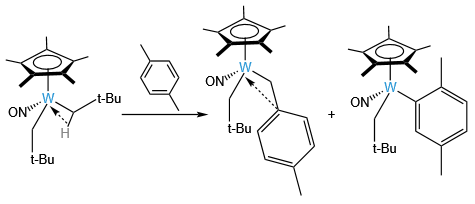
A reaction involving an electron-deficient alkyl-tungsten complex, showing the secondary bonding interactions, including the agostic interaction; note that neopentane is lost in this reaction

=== Aryl complexes ===
As with the alkyl tungsten complexes and most hydrocarbyl organometallics, aryl tungsten complexes can be prepared from tungsten halides and hydrocarbylating agents via transmetallation.

The thermolysis of the complexes Cp*W(NO)(aryl)_{2} results in the loss of an arene and the formation of aryne complexes (similar reactions are observed for other hydrocarbyl ligands). The aryne complexes are unstable and readily activate other C-H bonds (for instance, in solvent molecules).

=== Vinyl complexes ===
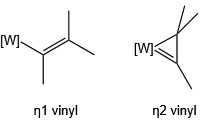

Vinyl ligands have two different modes of coordination with tungsten atoms, as depicted:

Synthesis is facilitated via transmetallation, the deprotonation of tungsten alkene complexes, nucleophilic addition to tungsten alkyne complexes, or alkyne insertion into W-H bonds. The isomerization of the η^{1} vinyl complexes into carbynes are possible via a [1,2]-hydrogen migration reaction from the alpha carbon, usually via η^{2} vinyl intermediates. Isomerization of the η^{2} vinyl complexes into allyl complexes are also known.

=== Alkynyl complexes ===
The resonance forms of alkynyl tungsten complexes

Alkynyl complexes of tungsten can be prepared via transmetallation or via the deprotonation of alkyne or carbene complexes of tungsten. An exotic method of preparation involves the reaction between [CpW(CO)_{3}]^{-} and CH_{2}I_{2}, forming the bridged complex [CpW(CO)_{3}](C≡C)[CpW(CO)_{3}] (along with side products). The main reactivity involves electrophilic attack on the beta-carbon (which forms vinylidene complexes), as explained in the resonance forms, and it is enhanced with the increasing electron density of the complex. Less common are electrophilic attack on the alpha carbon, which produces alkyne complexes, or electrophilic attack on the tungsten atom (as in the case when reacting with allylic halides) to produce allyl tungsten complexes.

Alkynyl tungsten complexes, along with propargyl tungsten complexes, have applications as templates during synthesis of cyclic compounds like lactones. For instance:

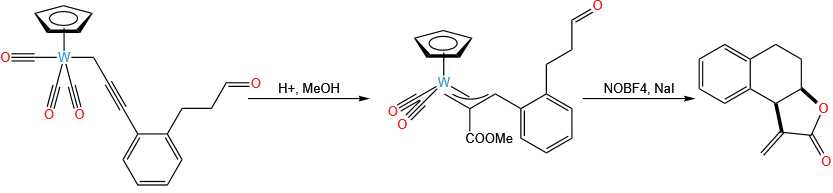
Synthesis of a lactone with an organotungsten template

== Carbene and carbyne complexes ==
=== Carbene complexes ===
The first tungsten carbene complexes were generated from organolithium reagents and tungsten hexacarbonyl (see the synthesis of Fischer carbenes). Applications include polymerizing alkynes and cyclopropanation of alkenes. Schrock-type tungsten carbene complexes are usually formed via alpha-deprotonation or alpha-elimination of alkyl tungsten complexes. Another synthesis method involves carbene transfer from carbene sources like Wittig's reagent. Tungsten carbene complexes are active alkene metathesis catalysts.

Tungsten vinylidene complexes (containing the metallaallene unit W=C=CHR) can be generated from alkynyl, carbyne, and alkyne tungsten complexes (see the respective sections of each coumpound). Vinylidene ligands are of strong π acceptor capabilities, therefore enabling catalytic applications of vinylidene complexes in alkyne polymerization reactions.

On a related note, the silylene complexes Cp*W(CO)_{2}(=SiR_{2}) can be produced from the photochemical reaction between Cp*W(CO)_{3}Me and HSiMe_{2}SiMeR_{2}, with the exact structure (monomeric/dimeric) dependent on the R group.

=== Carbyne complexes ===
Exchange of the alpha hydrogen within an organotungsten complex, note that the exact hydrocarbyl groups are omitted

Due to electronic effects, tungsten carbyne complexes often adopt slightly bent geometries. Common methods of synthesis involves treating tungsten carbenes of the form W=CXR (X indicates a good leaving group) with Lewis acids or alpha-deprotonation/alpha-dehydrogenation of tungsten carbene complexes. Some primary alkyl tungsten complexes (which may be the product of alkene insertion into W-H bonds) will spontaneously undergo double alpha-dehydrogenation, yielding tungsten carbynes and dihydrogen. As a result of the reversibility of alpha-dehydrogenation reactions, it's possible to observe the following reaction:

Another preparation method involves the metathesis reaction between the W≡W triple bond (most commonly from W_{2}(t-BuO)_{6}) and an alkyne (see the below section on alkyne metathesis). The reaction cannot proceed when the alkyne is diphenylacteylene due to steric hindrance, and instead forming a mixture of W_{2}(OR)_{4}(μ-PhC≡CPh)_{2} and W_{2}(OR)_{4}(μ-CPh)_{2}. If the C≡C triple bond is replaced with the C≡N of nitriles, then aside from the carbyne product, a nitrido complex containing W≡N shall yield. The exact reaction conditions are detailed in the article on W_{2}(t-BuO)_{6}.

Protonation of the carbynes have been documented, yielding an alpha-agostic cationic carbene complex. For W≡C-H complexes, deprotonation is also possible, forming an anion that can react with nucleophiles to form more complex carbyne complexes. Due to the electron-deficient nature of the center tungsten atom, it's conceivable that beta-hydrogens of the tungsten carbynes also possess some acidity.

== Acyclic π complexes ==
=== Alkene complexes ===
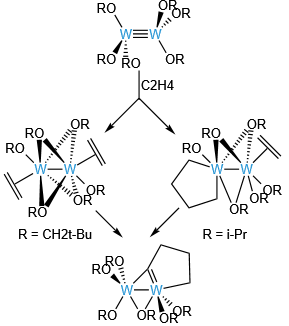
The reaction between ethylene and W_{2}(OR)_{6}

The bonding nature of tungsten alkene complexes can be described by the Dewar-Chatt-Duncanson model. Ligand substitution, thermal or photochemical, are most commonly used to prepare such complexes. Norbornadiene complexes (e.g. W(CO)_{4}(nbd)) have also been reported.

For complexes with double alkene ligands, it's possible to generate a metallacyclopentane complex via reductive coupling, which can be otherwise generated via intramolecular hydrogen transfer between alkyl and vinyl ligands.

=== Alkyne complexes ===
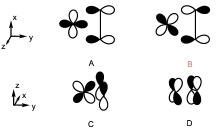
The orbital interactions of alkyne-metal complexes, with A & B being interactions between the parallel π orbitals with the d orbital, and C & D being the interactions between the perpendicular π orbital and the d orbitals. Note that B & D are backbonding interactions.

Alkyne ligands can adopt differing coordination modes with tungsten. Namely, when the tungsten atom is of d_{6} configuration (i.e. of low valent), the alkyne ligands are usually 2-electron donors; whereas in d_{4} & d_{2} configuration tungsten complexes, an additional empty d orbital is available for interaction with the alkyne, therefore the alkyne ligands tend to be 4-electron donors.

Some of tungsten alkyne complexes' reactivity arise from alkynes' role as variable electron donors (i.e. donating between 2 and 4 electrons). This is exemplified in the stepwise oxidation reaction shown below:

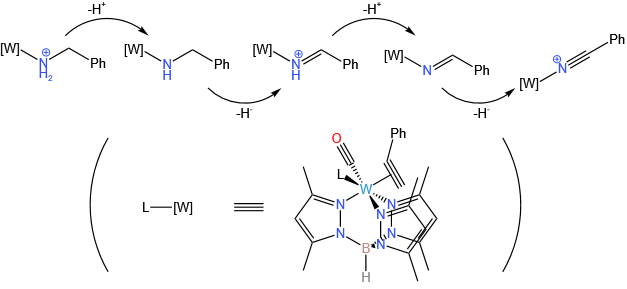
A stepwise oxidation reaction involving tungsten alkyne complexes

Tungsten complexes can act as templates for the synthesis of chiral alkynes via the reactions of alkyne tungsten complexes followed by alkyne ligand removal.

Tungsten alkyne complexes W(CO)_{6-n}(HC≡CR)_{n} (n = 1, 2) can be synthesized via photochemical or thermal displacement of carbonyl ligands on tungsten hexacarbonyl (see above). These complexes are unstable and rearrange into vinylidiene complexes of the form W(CO)_{5}(=C=CHR) via hydrogen migration. This is due to the repulsive interactions between the filled tungsten d orbital and the perpendicular alkyne π orbital. The interaction between the alkyne ligand and the tungsten center is best described in the form of metallacyclopropenes.

Electron-withdrawing substituents on alkynes can stabilize alkyne-tungsten complexes (for instance, in the compounds W(CO)_{2}(L-L)(RC≡CR)_{2}, where R is an electron-withdrawing group). This enhances the back-bonding towards the alkyne ligand, while decreasing the electron repulsions (see above paragraph).

One reaction involving tungsten alkyne complexes arises from treating the complex W(L)(PhC≡CPh)_{3} with excess diphenylacetylene. Reaction products can include tetraphenylcyclobutadiene complexes and pentaphenylcyclopentadienyl complexes as the result of diphenylacetylene coupling:

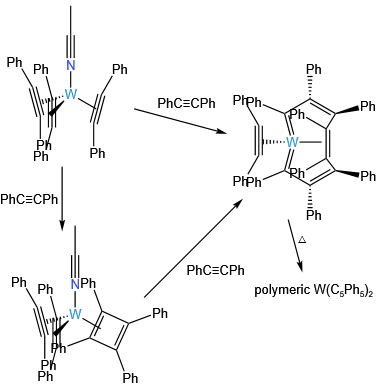

Related to this is the organotunsgten-catalyzed alkyne trimerization/polymerization, as detailed below in the arene-tungsten complex section.

Tungsten alkyne complexes are susceptible to nucleophilic attack; see the above section on vinyl tungsten complexes.

=== Allyl complexes ===
Tunsgten allyl complexes may be prepared via transmetallation between Grignard reagents. Examples of preparation methods involving the nucleophilic attack on allylic halides can be seen in the above section on alkynyl tungsten. The homoleptic allyl tungsten complex W(C_{3}H_{5})_{4} adopts a configuration with S_{4} symmetry (see molecular symmetry).

Some allyl tungsten complexes are synthetically useful, as in:

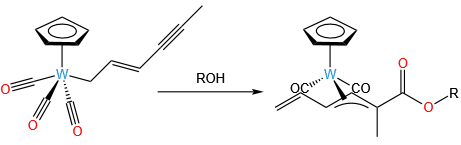
An allyl tungsten complex acting as an organic synthesis template

=== Other notable π complexes ===
The other, rather unusual π complexes of tungsten involve the π coordination of the carbonyl group, which almost always coordinate through the lone pair of the carbonyl oxygen atom (σ coordination). One example is TpW(NO)(PMe_{3})(η^{2}-DMF), where the nitrogen displays a pyramidal geometry and basicity, indicating loss of conjugation. It can be prepared from the corresponding benzene complex via ligand exchange (see below).

== Cyclic π complexes ==
=== Cyclobutadiene complexes ===
Tungsten cyclobutadiene complexes can be formed via coupling of alkyne ligands, see the above part on tungsten alkyne complexes.

=== Cyclopentadienyl complexes ===
Monomeric tungstenocene is highly unstable and polymerize above 10 kelvin to form a red-brown solid. It's generated via the photolysis of Cp_{2}WH_{2} or the thermolysis of Cp_{2}W(Me)H and readily inserts into C-H, O-H and B-B bonds. Similarly, the complex [Me_{2}Si(C_{5}Me_{4})_{2}]W(Me)H releases methane when heated in benzene, forming the compound [Me_{2}Si(C_{5}Me_{4})_{2}]W(Ph)H via a σ-alkane tungsten complex intermediate. The decaphenyl derivative of tungstenocene, W(C_{5}Ph_{5})_{2}, can be generated (in its polymeric form) by the coupling of diphenylacteylene ligands, as detailed in the above section on alkyne tungsten complexes. Oxidation into the mono- and di-valent cations are possible.

Cp_{2}WH_{2} is a strong Lewis base, forming adducts like [(Cp_{2}WH_{2})_{2}Ag]BF_{4} (which contains hydrogen bridges). It can be chlorinated with chloroform to form Cp_{2}WCl_{2}, and the reverse reaction (which is what is actually used during synthesis) is possible with lithium aluminum hydride. Cp_{2}WCl_{2} itself is made from cyclopentadienide and WCl_{4}(DME) and can be further oxidized into [Cp_{2}WCl_{2}]^{2+}. Many other tungstenocene derivatives can be produced from Cp_{2}WCl_{2}, like alkyl derivatives using halide metathesis. Cp_{2}W(O) can participate in [2+2] cycloaddition reactions.

Non-tunsgtenocene derived cyclopentadienyl tungsten complexes like Cp*WF_{5}, Cp*WMe_{4}, and amide derivatives can be prepared from precursors like Cp*WCl_{4}. Trichalcogenide cyclopentadienyl complexes are also known, and notable ones include the chiral complex [Cp*W(O)(S)(Se)]^{-} (prepared from Cp*W(S)_{2}Cl) and the complex [Cp*WS_{3}]^{-} (which can be used to synthesize cluster complexes).

Of great importance is the applications of cyclopentadienyl tungsten complexes in C-H bond activation. One example is shown below (note that R can stand for both alkyl and aryl groups):

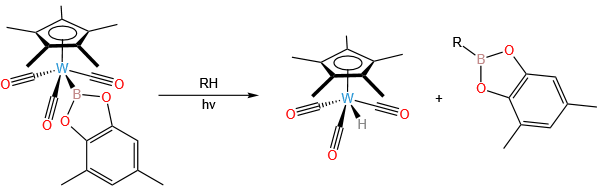
C-H bond activation via an organotungsten complex

=== Arene complexes ===
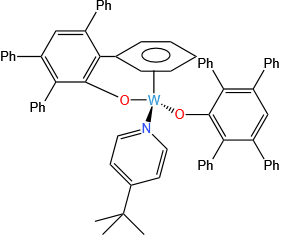
An example of an intramolecular arene tungsten complex

The dibenzenechromium analog [W(η^{6}-C_{6}H_{6})_{2}] is a yellow-green substance that has not been extensively studied due to difficult preparation. It is easily oxidized into [W(η^{6}-C_{6}H_{6})_{2}]^{+}, and can undergo protonation. Photolysis of tunsgeten hexacarbonyl in acetylene forms benzene and the complex (η^{6}-C_{6}H_{6})W(CO)_{3} (compare with the diphenylacetylene ligand coupling reaction discussed in the above section on alkyne complexes). Related complexes can catalyze the cyclotrimerization and polymerization of alkynes. Arene complexes deriving from intramolecular ligand interactions are known. For instance, the complex on the right can be generated by reducing the corresponding chloro-complex in the presence of the pyridine ligand.

In the unique arene-tungsten complex TpW(NO)(PMe_{3})(η^{2}-C_{6}H_{6}), the benzene adopts a η^{2} coordination mode. Such allows the unusual Diels-Alder reaction of the benzene ligand, which is normally extremely inert in this aspect. The reason behind this activation is related with the strong π backbonding to the arene ligand, localizing the electrons while rendering the bond carbon atoms unreactive (thereby allowing selective reaction of the uncoordinated carbon atoms). Pyridines can be activated in such manners as well, forming isoquinuclidine centers that are biologically significant. The arenes are also activated towards hydrogenation and electrophilic addition. It's worth noting that the tungsten in this case is rather π basic depite the acidic NO^{+} ligand (in fact, without which it would become too basic to be useful), and can form complexes with electron-deficient arenes that are not typically coordinating, such as fluorobenzenes.

A synthesis reaction utilizing this type of activation is exemplified below, note that the tungsten can be removed from the substrate oxidatively:

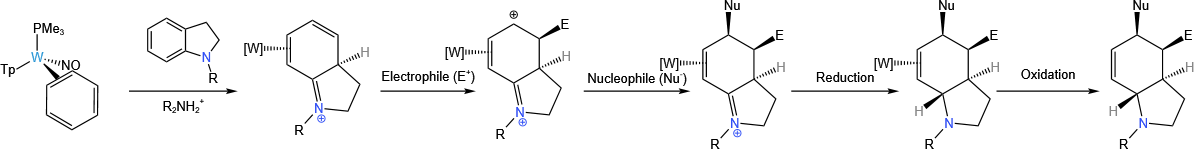
An example synthesis utilizing the dearomatization of arenes

Fullerene can also adopt this curious η^{2} coordination pattern in complexes like W(CO)_{3}(L-L)(η^{2}-C_{60}), where L-L denotes a bidentate ligand.

=== Cycloheptatrienyl complexes ===
The complex [(η^{7}-C_{7}H_{3}Me_{4})W(CO)_{3}]^{+} can be generated from the corresponding tropylium ion and the complex fac-[W(CO)_{3}(EtCN)_{3}]. The CO ligand can be displaced by iodide ions. It is worth noting that the same reaction but with the [C_{7}Me_{7}]^{+} cation would yield a η^{5} complex instead (and with an extra EtCN ligand attached) due to repulsion between the methyl groups that hinders planarity of the ligand.

== As metathesis catalysts ==
=== Alkene metathesis ===
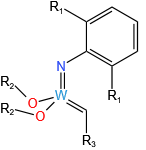
The general structure of tungsten-based olefin metathesis catalysts

The general structure of tungsten-based alkene metathesis catalysts is shown in the image. R_{1} is typically methyl or isopropyl, R_{2} is usually a bulky group, most commonly -CMe(CF_{3})_{2}, while R_{3} is typically a bulky alkyl group, like t-butyl or -CMe_{2}Ph. They belong to Schrock catalysts, and their activities can be tuned by varying the alkoxide group. It is also possible for the catalysts to act as stoichiometric olefinating reagents on hydroxy ketones (as analogous to Petasis reagent).

=== Alkyne metathesis ===
Many tungsten-based alkyne metathesis catalysts are of the general type [X_{3}W≡CR]. Activity is manipulated by the ligands. A typical route to such catalysts entails treatment neopentyl Grignard reagent to tungsten(VI) precursor (which involves transmetallation and alpha-deprotonation) followed by net alcoholysis of the alkyl ligands. Complex 3 can undergo a ligand exchange with lithium salts to generate Schrock type catalysts (complex 4). Another way to make complex 4 is via cleavage of internal alkyne by W(III) complex, such as 5. Complex 2, as well as 3, is unable to metathesize internal alkynes, the related pathway is shown right. In detail, compound 6 (when X is not OR) will react with two equivalent alkynes to form complex 7. Complex 7 will undergo an "associative path" to generate a metallabenzene complex 8. It will decompose to polymerized compounds or a cyclopentadienyl complex with a formally reduced tungsten center. Tungstenocenes, or tungsten-containing metallocenes, may be formed from these cyclopentadienyl complexes.

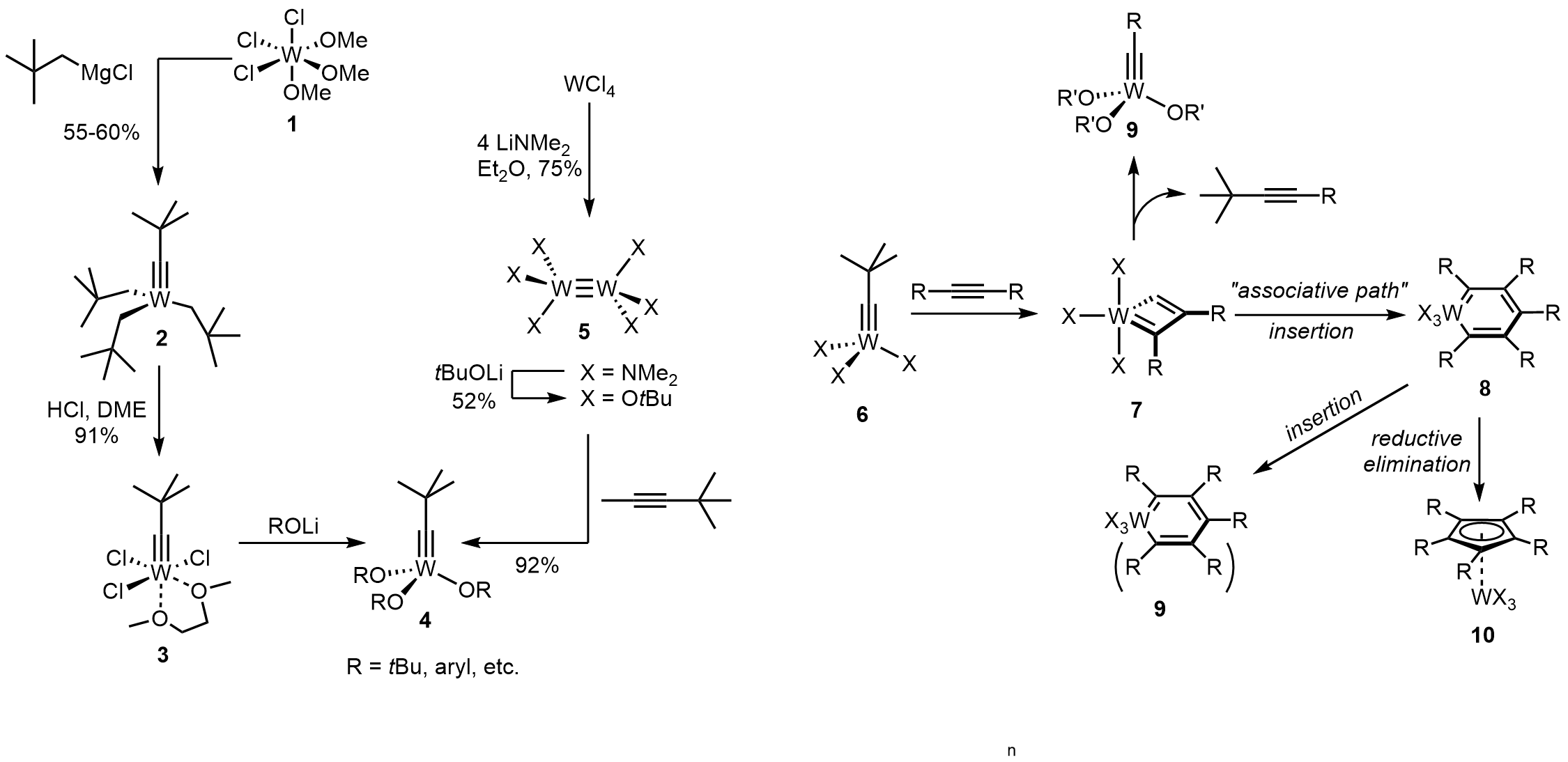

The formal 12-electron count of the W(VI) center in Schrock catalyst represents an appreciable Lewis acidity, which seriously limits the scope of these catalysts. For example, Schrock catalyst is unable to metathesize substrates containing donor or basic sites such as amines, thio ethers or crown ether segments. Acid-sensitive groups such as acetals can be destroyed. Replacement of tert-butoxide ligands by fluorinated alkoxides increase the Lewis acidic character. To reach a balance, it is proposed that a heteroleptic push/pull environment around the tungsten center will work.(as shown below) For example, complex 13 is highly active (with loading 1-2 mol% being sufficient) and compatible with many functional groups.

== Gallery ==
A tungsten allene complex, generated from W_{2}(OCH_{2}t-Bu)_{8} and allenes

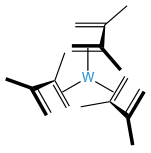
A homoleptic tungsten butadiene complex of the rare trigonal prismatic geometry

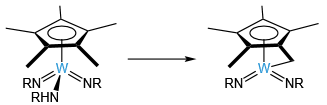
An unusual reaction involving cyclopentadienyl tunsgten complexes

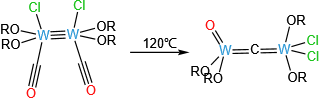
A reaction that cleaves the carbonyl ligand

== See also ==
- Organochromium chemistry
- Organomolybdenum chemistry
