= Sodium tert-butoxide =

Names
- Preferred IUPAC name Sodium tert-butoxide
- Other names: Sodium t-butoxide; Sodium t-butanolate; Sodium t-butylate; NaO^{t}Bu

Identifiers
CAS Number	865-48-5
3D model (JSmol)	Interactive image; Interactive image
Abbreviations	t-BuONa tBuONa^{t}BuONa; Me_{3}CONa
ChemSpider	63267
ECHA InfoCard	100.011.584
PubChem CID	70078
CompTox Dashboard (EPA)	DTXSID7073935
- InChI: InChI=1S/C4H9O.Na/c1-4(2,3)5;/h1-3H3;/q-1;+1 Key: MFRIHAYPQRLWNB-UHFFFAOYSA-N; InChI=1/C4H9O.Na/c1-4(2,3)5;/h1-3H3;/q-1;+1 Key: MFRIHAYPQRLWNB-UHFFFAOYAB
- SMILES: [Na+].[O-]C(C)(C)C; CC(C)(C)[O-].[Na+]

Properties
Chemical formula	C_{4}H_{9}NaO
Molar mass	96.105 g·mol^{−1}
Appearance	White solid
Density	1.025 g/cm^{3}
Acidity (pK_{a})	19

Hazards
Flash point	14 °C (57 °F; 287 K)
- Safety data sheet (SDS)
- Except where otherwise noted, data are given for materials in their standard state (at 25 °C [77 °F], 100 kPa). verify (what is ?) Infobox references

Sodium tert-butoxide (or sodium t-butoxide) is a chemical compound with the formula (CH_{3})_{3}CONa (abbr. NaOtBu). It is a strong, non-nucleophilic base. It is flammable and moisture sensitive. It is sometimes written in the chemical literature as sodium t-butoxide. It is similar in reactivity to the more common potassium tert-butoxide.

The compound can be produced by treating tert-butyl alcohol with sodium hydride.

== Reactions ==
One application for sodium tert-butoxide is as a non-nucleophilic base. It has been widely used in the Buchwald–Hartwig amination, as in this typical example:

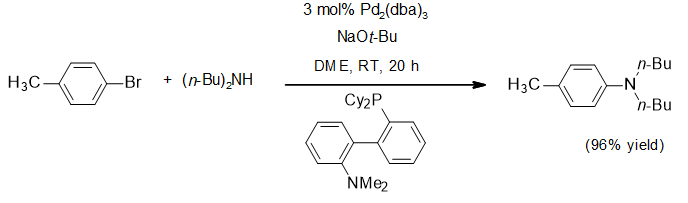
A typical Buchwald-Hartwig amination using sodium tert-butoxide

Sodium tert-butoxide is used to prepare tert-butoxide complexes. For example hexa(tert-butoxy)ditungsten(III) is thus obtained by the salt metathesis reaction from a ditungsten heptachloride:

NaW_{2}Cl_{7}(THF)_{5} + 6 NaOBu-t → W_{2}(OBu-t)_{6} + 7 NaCl + 5 THF

== Structure ==
Sodium tert-butoxide forms clusters in the solid state, both hexamers and nonamers.

hexamer	nonamer

== Related compounds ==
- Potassium tert-butoxide
- Lithium tert-butoxide
- Sodium tert-amyloxide (NaOC(CH_{3})_{2}C_{2}H_{5}), a highly soluble analogue of sodium tert-butoxide
