= Tantalum(V) ethoxide =

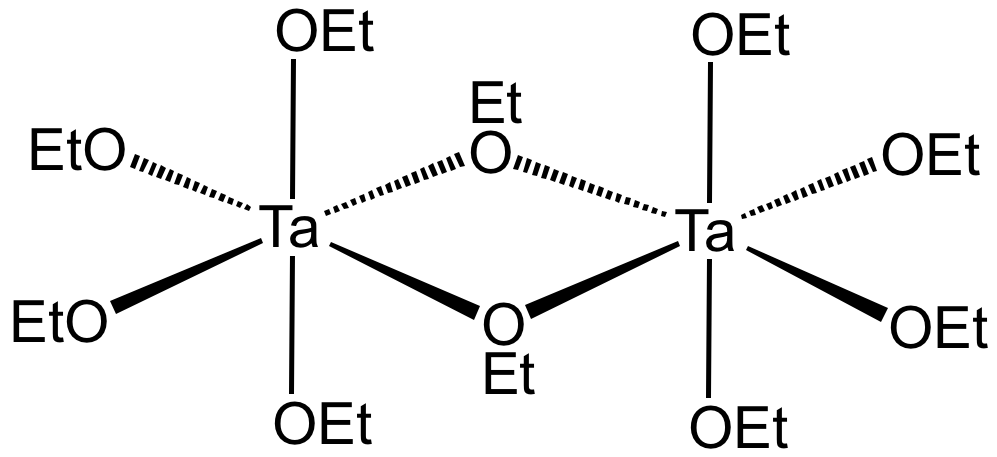

Names
- IUPAC name Tantalum(V) ethoxide
- Other names: Tantalum ethylate; Tantalum(V) ethylate; Pentaethyl tantalate; Tantalum pentaethoxide; Pentaethoxytantalum(V); Tantalum(5+) pentaethanolate

Identifiers
CAS Number	6074-84-6
3D model (JSmol)	Interactive image
ChemSpider	21169490
ECHA InfoCard	100.025.464
EC Number	228-010-2
PubChem CID	160806
CompTox Dashboard (EPA)	DTXSID7064104
- InChI: InChI=1S/5C2H5O.Ta/c5*1-2-3;/h5*2H2,1H3;/q5*-1;+5 Key: HSXKFDGTKKAEHL-UHFFFAOYSA-N
- SMILES: [Ta+5].[O-]CC.[O-]CC.[O-]CC.[O-]CC.[O-]CC

Properties
Chemical formula	C_{10}H_{25}O_{5}Ta
Molar mass	406.25 g mol^{−1}
Appearance	Colorless liquid
Density	1.566 g/cm^{3} (at 25 °C)
Melting point	21 °C (70 °F; 294 K)
Boiling point	145 °C (293 °F; 418 K) at 0.0133 kPa
Solubility in water	reacts
Solubility	Organic solvents
Refractive index (n_{D})	1.488

Hazards
- GHS labelling
Pictograms	(GHS02: Flammable) (GHS05: Corrosive) (GHS07: Exclamation mark)
Signal word	Danger
Hazard statements	H226, H314, H319, H335
Precautionary statements	P280, P305+P351+P338
NFPA 704 (fire diamond)	2 1 2 W
Flash point	31 °C; 87 °F; 304 K
Safety data sheet (SDS)	External MSDS
- Except where otherwise noted, data are given for materials in their standard state (at 25 °C [77 °F], 100 kPa). Infobox references

Tantalum(V) ethoxide is a metalorganic compound with formula Ta_{2}(OC_{2}H_{5})_{10}, often abbreviated as Ta_{2}(OEt)_{10}. It is a colorless solid that dissolves in some organic solvents but hydrolyzes readily. It is used to prepare films of tantalum(V) oxide.

== Structure ==
Tantalum(V) alkoxides typically exist as dimers with octahedral six-coordinate tantalum metal centres. Subsequent crystallographic analysis established that the methoxide and isopropoxides of niobium adopt bioctahedral structures. From a geometric perspective, the ten ethoxide ligand oxygen atoms of the Ta_{2}(OEt)_{10} molecule in solution define a pair of octahedra sharing a common edge with the two tantalum atoms located at their centres. From a bonding perspective, each tantalum centre is surrounded octahedrally by four monodentate and two bridging ethoxide ligands. The oxygen atoms of the bridging ethoxides are each bonded to both tantalum centres, and these two ligands are cis to one another within the coordination sphere. The formula [(EtO)_{4}Ta(μ-OEt)]_{2} more comprehensively represents this dimeric structure, although the simplified formula is commonly used for most purposes.

== Preparation ==
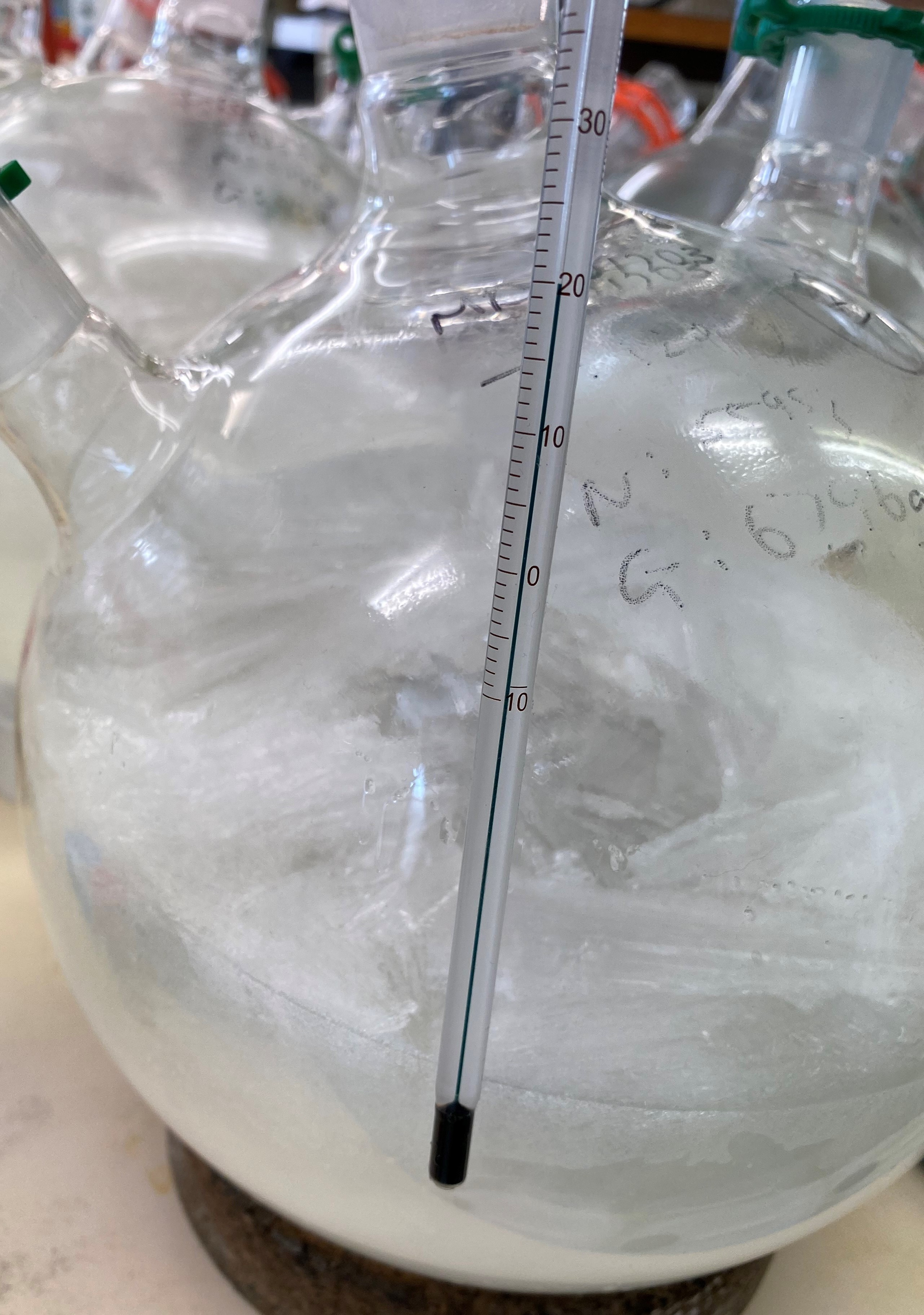
5 kg of distilled pure tantalum ethoxide, showing that it is a solid at 20 °C.

Several approaches are known for preparing tantalum(V) ethoxide. Salt metathesis from tantalum(V) chloride is generally the most successful. Tantalum pentachloride, Ta_{2}Cl_{10}, provides a convenient starting point. To avoid the generation of mixed chloride-ethoxide species, a base such as ammonia is usually added to trap liberated HCl:

10 EtOH + Ta_{2}Cl_{10} + 10 NH_{3} → Ta_{2}(OEt)_{10} + 10 NH_{4}Cl

Salt metathesis using an alkali metal alkoxide can be used as well:

10 NaOEt + Ta_{2}Cl_{10} → Ta_{2}(OEt)_{10} + 10 NaCl

The same compound can be prepared electrochemically. The two half-equations and the overall equation for this reaction are:

cathode: 2 EtOH + 2 e^{−} → 2 EtO^{−} + H_{2}
anode: Ta → "Ta^{5+}" + 5 e^{−}
overall: 2 Ta + 10 EtOH → 2 "Ta^{5+}" + 10 EtO^{−} + 5 H_{2} → Ta_{2}(OEt)_{10} + 5 H_{2}

Commercial production of tantalum(V) ethoxide using this electrochemical approach has been employed in Russia. The compound can also be prepared by direct reaction of tantalum metal with ethanol, in which case the overall equation is the same as that shown above for the electrochemical approach.

Since the 1970s, Bayer of Germany had been producing tantalum(V) ethoxide in Leverkusen, however following the break-up of Bayer, production moved to Heraeus. Meanwhile, Inorgtech (later MultiValent), started production in 1974 in Cambridge, UK. Both routes involved the direct reaction of the metal chloride with alcohol in the presence of solvents to give a product of 99.999%+ purity.

== Reactions ==
The most important reaction of tantalum alkoxides is hydrolysis to produce films and gels of tantalum oxides. Although these reactions are complex, the formation of a tantalum(V) oxide film by hydrolysis can be described by this simplified equation:

Ta_{2}(OC_{2}H_{5})_{10} + 5 H_{2}O → Ta_{2}O_{5} + 10 C_{2}H_{5}OH

Tantalum(V) ethoxide optical coatings can be produced by low pressure chemical vapour deposition. At pressures as low as 1.33 mPa and temperatures of 700 °C, a silica film of the desired depth is first deposited by the decomposition of tetraethoxysilane, Si(OEt)_{4}, or di-t-butyoxydiacetoxysilane, Si(OC(CH_{3})_{3})_{2}(OOCCH_{3})_{2}, then tantalum(V) ethoxide is introduced. As in the case of niobium(V) ethoxide, the ethoxide precursor thermally decomposes to produce the oxide layer with the associated release of diethyl ether:

Ta_{2}(OEt)_{10} → Ta_{2}O_{5} + 5 Et–O–Et

Pyrolysis also produces a tantalum(V) oxide film by chemical vapor deposition in which case the tantalum(V) ethoxide is completely oxidised, producing carbon dioxide and water vapor:

Ta_{2}(OC_{2}H_{5})_{10} + 30 O_{2} → Ta_{2}O_{5} + 20 CO_{2} + 25 H_{2}O

Amorphous tantalum(V) oxide films can also be prepared by atomic layer deposition or by a pulsed chemical vapour deposition technique in which tantalum(V) ethoxide and tantalum(V) chloride are applied alternately. At temperatures approaching 450 °C the films produced have refractive indices and permittivity properties similar to those produced from conventional approaches. The preparation of these films occurs with the loss of chloroethane:

Ta_{2}(OC_{2}H_{5})_{10} + Ta_{2}Cl_{10} → 2 Ta_{2}O_{5} + 10 C_{2}H_{5}Cl

Sol-gel processing also produces thin films of tantalum(V) oxide using a similar chemical approach. Sol-gel routes using tantalum(V) ethoxide to generate layered perovskite materials have also been developed.

== Applications ==
It is mainly used for the manufacture of tantalum(V) oxide thin-film materials by approaches including chemical vapor deposition, atomic layer deposition, and sol-gel processing. These materials have semiconductor, electrochromic, and optical applications.

Tantalum(V) oxide films have a variety of applications including as optical films with refractive indices as high as 2.039 and as a thin-film dielectric material in dynamic random access memory and semiconductor field-effect transistors. The approach chosen for preparation of these materials is determined by the desired properties. Direct hydrolysis is appropriate when the presence of residual water or the use of high temperatures for drying is acceptable. Micropatterns can be produced by site-selective deposition using the hydrolysis approach by forming a self-assembled monolayer followed by high temperature annealling. Chemical vapour deposition allows control of the thickness of the film on a nanometre scale, which is essential for some applications. Direct pyrolysis is convenient for optical applications, where transparent materials with low light loss due to absorption is important, and has also been used to prepare nitride read-only memory. Electrochromism is the property of some materials to change color when charge is applied, and is the means by which so-called smart glass operates. Films produced by tantalum(V) ethoxide hydrolysis has been used to prepare amorphous tantalum(V) oxide films suitable for electrochromic applications.

Mixed-metal thin-films have also been prepared from this compound. For example, lithium tantalate, LiTaO_{3}, films are desirable for their non-linear optical properties and have been prepared by first reacting tantalum(V) ethoxide with lithium dipivaloylmethanate, LiCH(COC(CH_{3})_{3})_{2}, to prepare a precursor suitable for metalorganic vapour phase epitaxy (a form of chemical vapor deposition). Films of strontium tantalate, Sr(TaO_{3})_{2}, have also been prepared using atomic layer deposition approaches and their properties investigated.

Tantalum(V) ethoxide condenses with carboxylic acids to give oxo-alkoxide-carboxylates, e.g., Ta_{4}O_{4}(OEt)_{8}(OOCCH_{3})_{4}. The Ta_{4}O_{4} core of such compounds form a cubane-type cluster.
