= Copper(I) tert-butoxide =

Names
- Other names copper(1+);2-methylpropan-2-olate

Identifiers
CAS Number	35342-67-7 all; tetramer: 60842-00-4
3D model (JSmol)	monomer: Interactive image
ChemSpider	monomer: 9427070
PubChem CID	monomer: 11252043
CompTox Dashboard (EPA)	monomer: DTXSID80460062
- InChI: monomer: InChI=1S/C4H9O.Cu/c1-4(2,3)5;/h1-3H3;/q-1;+1 Key: WILFNLHOTDCRAO-UHFFFAOYSA-N
- SMILES: monomer: CC(C)(C)[O-].[Cu+]

Properties
Chemical formula	C_{16}H_{36}Cu_{4}O_{4}
Molar mass	546.644 g·mol^{−1}
Appearance	White solid
Density	1.62 g/cm^{3} (octamer)
Melting point	260 °C (500 °F; 533 K)
- Except where otherwise noted, data are given for materials in their standard state (at 25 °C [77 °F], 100 kPa). Infobox references

Copper(I) tert-butoxide is an alkoxide of copper(I). It is a white sublimable solid. It is a reagent in the synthesis of other copper compounds.

The compound was originally obtained by salt metathesis from lithium tert-butoxide and copper(I) chloride. An octameric form was obtained by alcoholysis of mesitylcopper:

8 CuC_{6}H_{2}Me_{3} + 8 HOBu-t → 8 HC_{6}H_{2}Me_{3} + [CuOBu-t]_{8}
