= Calcium nitride =

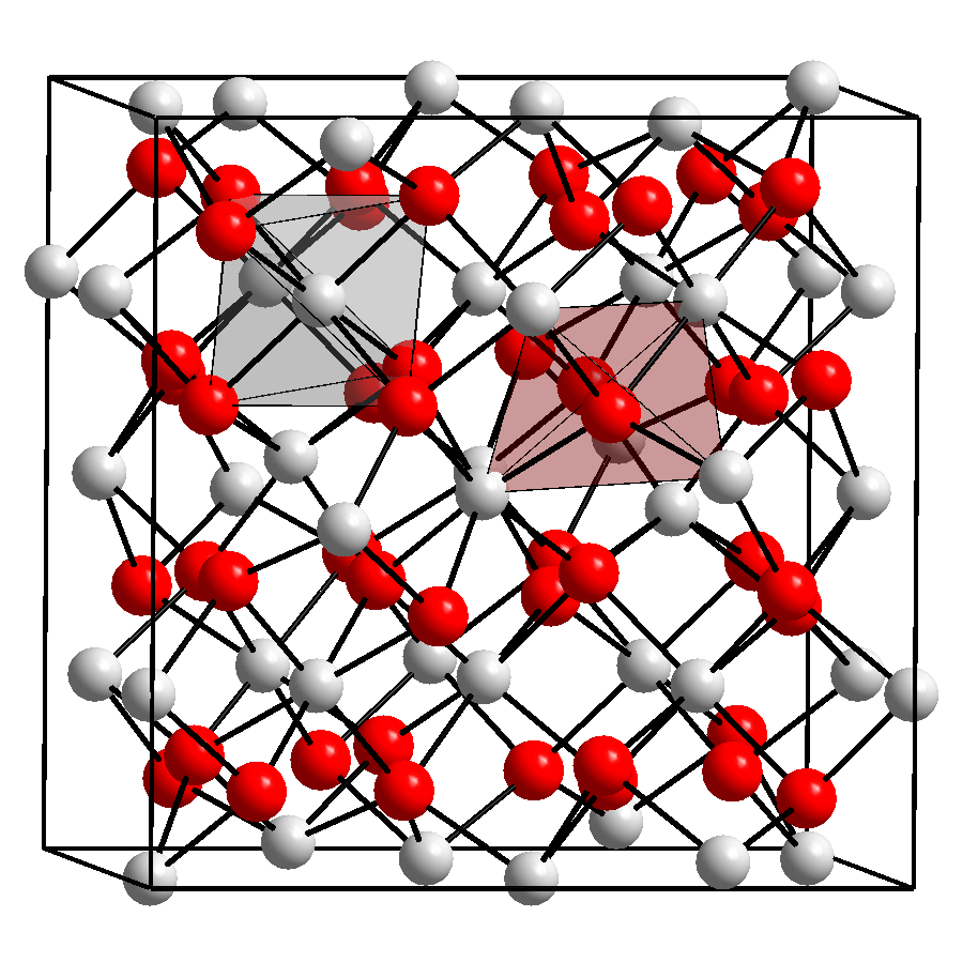
- Unit cell containing 31 nitride ions (white) and 48 calcium ions (red). Each nitride is surrounded by six calcium, and each calcium by four nitride ions.

Names
- IUPAC name Calcium nitride
- Other names tricalcium dinitride

Identifiers
CAS Number	12013-82-0
3D model (JSmol)	Interactive image; Interactive image; Interactive image
ChemSpider	10617534
ECHA InfoCard	100.031.435
EC Number	234-592-9
PubChem CID	3387080
CompTox Dashboard (EPA)	DTXSID30892172
- InChI: InChI=1S/3Ca.2N; InChI=1S/3Ca.2N/q3*+2;2*-3; InChI=1S/3Ca.2N/q;;+2;2*-1
- SMILES: [Ca]=N[Ca]N=[Ca]; [Ca+2].[Ca+2].[Ca+2].[N-3].[N-3]; [Ca]=[N-].[Ca+2].[N-]=[Ca]

Properties
Chemical formula	Ca_{3}N_{2}
Molar mass	148.248 g·mol^{−1}
Appearance	red-brown crystalline solid
Density	2.670 g/cm^{3}; 2.63 g/cm^{3} (17 °C)
Melting point	1,195 °C (2,183 °F; 1,468 K)
Solubility in water	decomposes

Structure
Crystal structure	Cubic, cI80
Space group	Ia-3, No. 206

Hazards
- GHS labelling
Pictograms	(GHS02: Flammable) (GHS05: Corrosive) (GHS06: Toxic) (GHS09: Environmental hazard)
Signal word	Danger
Hazard statements	H260, H261, H314, H331, H400
Precautionary statements	P223, P231+P232, P260, P264, P271, P273, P280, P301+P330+P331, P302+P335+P334, P302+P361+P354, P304+P340, P305+P354+P338, P316, P321, P363, P370+P378, P391, P402+P404, P403+P233, P405, P501

Related compounds
Other anions	Calcium fluoride; Calcium oxide
Other cations	Beryllium nitride Magnesium nitride Strontium nitride Barium nitride Radium nitride Zinc nitride Aluminium nitride Lithium nitride Sodium nitride Potassium nitride
Related compounds	Ammonia; Calcium amide; Calcium imide
- Except where otherwise noted, data are given for materials in their standard state (at 25 °C [77 °F], 100 kPa). verify (what is ?) Infobox references

Calcium nitride is the inorganic compound with the chemical formula Ca_{3}N_{2}. It exists in various forms (isomorphs), α-calcium nitride being more commonly encountered.

== Structure ==
α-Calcium nitride adopts an anti-bixbyite structure, similar to Mn_{2}O_{3}, except that the positions of the ions are reversed: calcium (Ca^{2+}) take the oxide (O^{2−}) positions and nitride ions (N^{3−}) the manganese (Mn^{3+}). In this structure, Ca^{2+} occupies tetrahedral sites, and the nitride centres occupy two different types of octahedral sites.

== Synthesis and reactions ==
Calcium nitride is formed along with the oxide, CaO, when calcium burns in air. It can be produced by direct reaction of the elements:

3 Ca + N_{2} → Ca_{3}N_{2}

It reacts with water or even the moisture in air to give ammonia and calcium hydroxide:

Ca_{3}N_{2} + 6 H_{2}O → 3 Ca(OH)_{2} + 2 NH_{3}

Like sodium oxide, calcium nitride absorbs hydrogen above 350 °C:

Ca_{3}N_{2} + 2 H_{2} → 2 CaNH + CaH_{2}

== General references ==
- Greenwood, Norman N.; Earnshaw, Alan (1997). Chemistry of the Elements (2nd ed.). Butterworth-Heinemann. doi:10.1016/C2009-0-30414-6. ISBN 978-0-08-037941-8.
