= Nitride =

Compound of nitrogen with a formal oxidation state of –3

In chemistry, a nitride is a chemical compound of nitrogen. Nitrides can be inorganic or organic, ionic or covalent. The nitride anion, N^{3−}, is very elusive but compounds of nitride are numerous, although rarely naturally occurring. Some applications of nitride compounds include wear-resistant coatings (e.g., titanium nitride, TiN), hard ceramic materials (e.g., silicon nitride, Si_{3}N_{4}), and semiconductors (e.g., gallium nitride, GaN). The development of GaN-based light emitting diodes was recognized by the 2014 Nobel Prize in Physics. Metal nitrido complexes are also common.

Synthesis of inorganic metal nitrides is challenging because nitrogen gas (N_{2}) is not very reactive at low temperatures, but it becomes more reactive at higher temperatures. Therefore, a balance must be achieved between the low reactivity of nitrogen gas at low temperatures and the entropy driven formation of N_{2} at high temperatures. However, synthetic methods for nitrides are growing more sophisticated and the materials are of increasing technological relevance.

== Uses of nitrides ==
Like carbides, nitrides are often refractory materials owing to their high lattice energy, which reflects the strong bonding of "N^{3−}" to metal cation(s). Thus, cubic boron nitride, titanium nitride, and silicon nitride are used as cutting materials and hard coatings. Hexagonal boron nitride, which adopts a layered structure, is a useful high-temperature lubricant akin to molybdenum disulfide. Nitride compounds often have large band gaps, thus nitrides are usually insulators or wide-bandgap semiconductors; examples include boron nitride and silicon nitride. The wide-band gap material gallium nitride is prized for emitting blue light in LEDs. Like some oxides, nitrides can absorb hydrogen and have been discussed in the context of hydrogen storage, e.g. lithium nitride.

== Examples ==
Classification of such a varied group of compounds is somewhat arbitrary. Compounds where nitrogen is not assigned −3 oxidation state are not included, such as nitrogen trichloride where the oxidation state is +3; nor are ammonia and its many organic derivatives.

=== Nitrides of the s-block elements ===
Only one alkali metal nitride is stable, the purple-reddish lithium nitride (Li_{3}N), which forms when lithium burns in an atmosphere of N_{2}. Both sodium nitride and potassium nitride have been synthesized, but remain a laboratory curiosity. The nitrides of the alkaline earth metals that have the formula M_{3}N_{2} are however numerous. Examples include beryllium nitride (Be_{3}N_{2}), magnesium nitride (Mg_{3}N_{2}), calcium nitride (Ca_{3}N_{2}), and strontium nitride (Sr_{3}N_{2}). The nitrides of electropositive metals (including Li, Zn, and the alkaline earth metals) readily hydrolyze upon contact with water, including the moisture in the air:

Mg_{3}N_{2} + 6 H_{2}O → 3 Mg(OH)_{2} + 2 NH_{3}

=== Nitrides of the p-block elements ===
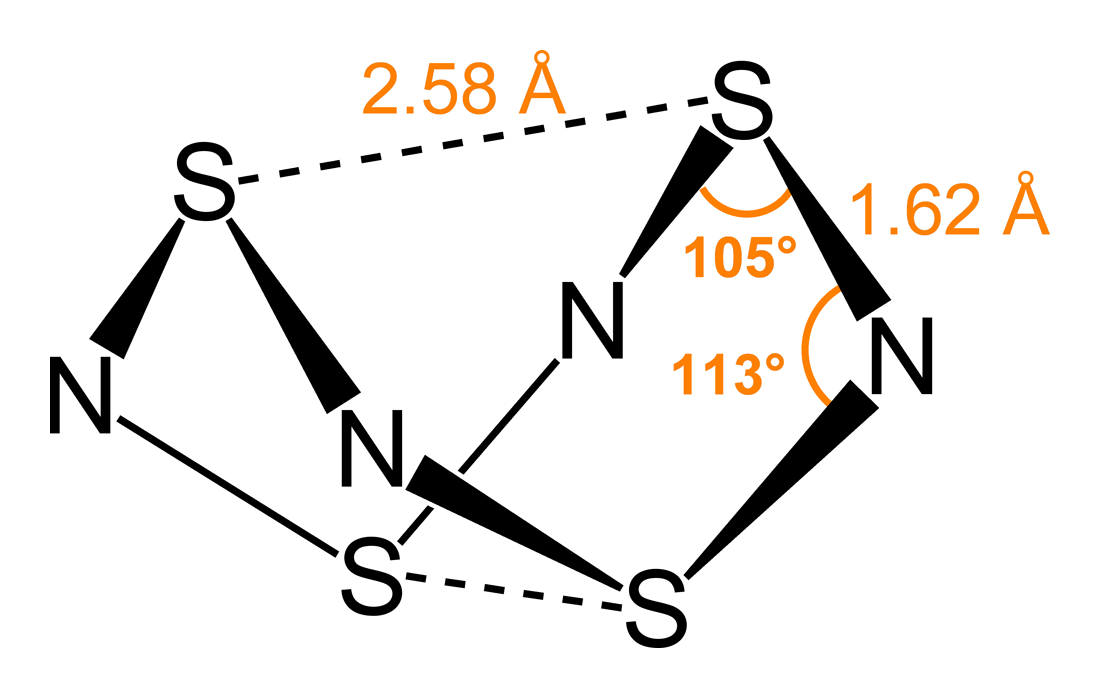
S_{4}N_{4} is a prototypical binary molecular nitride.

Boron nitride exists as several forms (polymorphs). Nitrides of silicon and phosphorus are also known, but only the former is commercially important. The nitrides of aluminium, gallium, and indium adopt the hexagonal wurtzite structure in which each atom occupies tetrahedral sites. For example, in aluminium nitride, each aluminium atom has four neighboring nitrogen atoms at the corners of a tetrahedron and similarly each nitrogen atom has four neighboring aluminium atoms at the corners of a tetrahedron. This structure is like hexagonal diamond (lonsdaleite) where every carbon atom occupies a tetrahedral site (however wurtzite differs from sphalerite and diamond in the relative orientation of tetrahedra). Thallium(I) nitride (Tl_{3}N) is known, but thallium(III) nitride (TlN) is not.

Only chlorine, oxygen, and fluorine are more electronegative than nitrogen, but IUPAC nomenclature of inorganic chemistry orders most elements by group rather than strict electronegativity. This convention is not typically followed for molecular compounds of nitrogen and higher chalcogens: such compounds are called sulfur nitrides, selenium nitrides, and tellurium nitrides. The opposite is true for nitrogen-halogen compounds, which are all named as halides despite nitrogen tribromide and nitrogen triiodide having negative formal charge on nitrogen.

Cyanogen ((CN)_{2}) and tetrasulfur tetranitride (S_{4}N_{4}) are rare examples of a molecular binary (containing one element aside from nitrogen) nitrides. They dissolve in nonpolar solvents. Both undergo polymerization. S_{4}N_{4} is also unstable with respect to the elements, but less so that the isostructural Se_{4}N_{4}. Heating S_{4}N_{4} gives a polymer, and a variety of molecular sulfur nitride anions and cations are also known.

=== Transition metal nitrides ===
Most metal-rich transition metal nitrides adopt a relatively ordered face-centered cubic or hexagonal close-packed crystal structure, with octahedral coordination. Sometimes these materials are called "interstitial nitrides". They are essential for industrial metallurgy, because they are typically much harder and less ductile than their parent metal, and resist air-oxidation. For the group 3 metals, ScN and YN are both known. Group 4, 5, and 6 transition metals (the titanium, vanadium and chromium groups) all form chemically stable, refractory nitrides with high melting point. Thin films of titanium nitride, zirconium nitride, and tantalum nitride protect many industrial surfaces.

Nitrides of the group 7 and 8 transition metals tend to be nitrogen-poor, and decompose readily at elevated temperatures. For example, iron nitride, Fe_{2}N decomposes at 200 °C. Platinum nitride and osmium nitride may contain N_{2} units, and as such should not be called nitrides.

Nitrides of heavier members from group 11 and 12 are less stable than copper nitride (Cu_{3}N) and zinc nitride (Zn_{3}N_{2}): dry silver nitride (Ag_{3}N) is a contact explosive which may detonate from the slightest touch, even a falling water droplet.

=== Nitrides of the lanthanides and actinides ===
Nitride containing species of the lanthanides and actinides are of scientific interest as they can provide a useful handle for determining covalency of bonding. Nuclear magnetic resonance (NMR) spectroscopy along with quantum chemical analysis has often been used to determine the degree to which metal nitride bonds are ionic or covalent in character. One example, a uranium nitride, has the highest known nitrogen-15 chemical shift.

=== High-pressure nitrides ===
Laser-heated diamond anvil cells have been used to synthesize a wide range of previously unknown binary nitrides by reacting elemental metals directly with molecular nitrogen at pressures from tens to over a hundred gigapascals, revealing nitrogen's capacity to form catenated (chain-, ring-, or network-forming) anions rather than simple isolated N^{3−} ions. Examples include scandium polynitrides containing N_{6}^{6−} and N_{8}^{6−} units as well as corrugated two-dimensional polynitrogen layers, yttrium nitrides featuring an N_{18} macrocycle and a polynitrogen double helix, and zinc nitrides containing polyacetylene-like [N_{4}]_{∞}^{2−} chains.

== Related anions ==
Related to but distinct from nitride are the diazenide diatomic anion (N^{2−}_{2}), the pernitride diatomic anion (N^{4−}_{2}), and the azide triatomic anion (N^{−}_{3}).
