= Lithium phosphide =

Names
- Other names Trilithium phosphide

Identifiers
CAS Number	12057-29-3
3D model (JSmol)	Interactive image
ChemSpider	74796
ECHA InfoCard	100.031.824
EC Number	235-020-0
PubChem CID	25199615
CompTox Dashboard (EPA)	DTXSID4065232
- InChI: InChI=1S/3Li.H2P/h;;;1H2/q3*+1;-1 Key: IEAMEDSGNMSUND-UHFFFAOYSA-N
- SMILES: [Li+].[Li+].[Li+].[P-3]

Properties
Chemical formula	Li_{3}P
Molar mass	51.79 g·mol^{−1}
Appearance	Red-brown crystals
Density	1.43 g/cm^{3}
Solubility in water	Reacts

Structure
Crystal structure	hexagonal

Related compounds
Other anions	Lithium nitride; Lithium arsenide
Other cations	Sodium phosphide; Calcium phosphide; Aluminium phosphide; Scandium phosphide; Lanthanum phosphide
- Except where otherwise noted, data are given for materials in their standard state (at 25 °C [77 °F], 100 kPa). Infobox references

Lithium phosphide is an inorganic compound of lithium and phosphorus with the chemical formula Li_{3}P. This dark colored compound is formally the lithium salt of phosphine, consisting of lithium cations Li^{+} and phosphide anions P^{3−}. It is hazardous to handle because of its high reactivity toward air.

== Synthesis ==
Heating red phosphorus and lithium in an argon atmosphere:

12 Li + P_{4} → 4 Li_{3}P

Reaction of monolithium phosphide and lithium:

LiP + 2 Li → Li_{3}P

== Physical and chemical properties ==
Lithium phosphide forms red-brown crystals of hexagonal systems, space group P6_{3}/mmc, cell parameters a = 0.4264 nm, c = 0.7579 nm, Z = 2.

The compound is a very strong base, and reacts with water to release phosphine:

Li_{3}P + 3 H_{2}O → 3 LiOH + PH_{3}

== Uses ==
The compound is proposed to be used as a potential electrolyte for solid-state devices.

== Related compounds ==
Reaction of lithium with red phosphorus at 870 °C gives Li_{3}P_{7}.

== Safety ==
Alkali metal phosphides are dangerous compounds when exposed to oxygen or moisture.
