= Sodium phosphide =

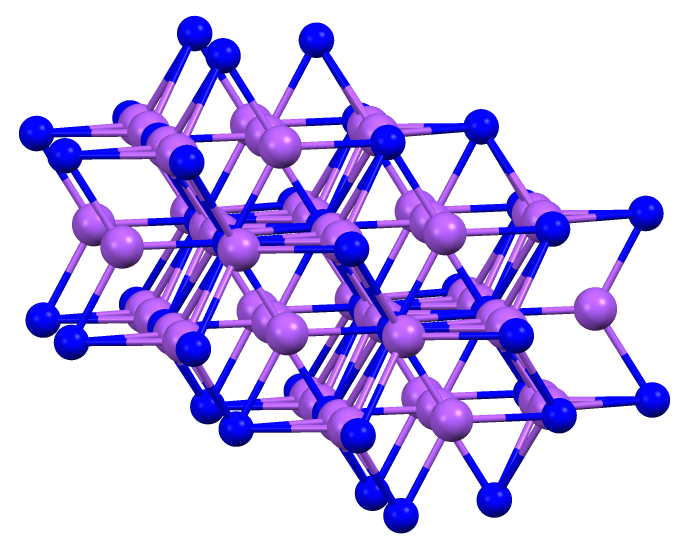

Names
- Other names sodium phosphide, trisodiophosphine

Identifiers
CAS Number	12058-85-4
3D model (JSmol)	Interactive image
ChemSpider	55463
ECHA InfoCard	100.031.834
EC Number	235-031-0
PubChem CID	61547
UNII	A360RQX9W2
- InChI: InChI=1S/3Na.P/q3*+1;-3 Key: FHHBFSHDCCEUKM-UHFFFAOYSA-N; InChI=1/3Na.P/q3*+1;-3 Key: FHHBFSHDCCEUKM-UHFFFAOYAE
- SMILES: [Na+].[Na+].[Na+].[P-3]

Properties
Chemical formula	Na_{3}P
Molar mass	99.943 g/mol
Appearance	red crystals
Density	1.74 g/cm^{3}
Melting point	650 °C (1,202 °F; 923 K)
Solubility in water	hydrolysis
Solubility	insoluble in liquid CO_{2}

Structure
Crystal structure	hexagonal a = 4.9512 Å c = 8.7874 Å
Coordination geometry	around P 5 near neighbours, trigonal bipyramid

Related compounds
Other anions	sodium arsenide sodium nitride
Other cations	aluminium phosphide lithium phosphide potassium phosphide
- Except where otherwise noted, data are given for materials in their standard state (at 25 °C [77 °F], 100 kPa). verify (what is ?) Infobox references

Sodium phosphide is the inorganic compound with the formula Na_{3}P. It is a black solid. It is often described as Na^{+} salt of the P^{3−} anion. Na_{3}P is a source of the highly reactive phosphide anion. It should not be confused with sodium phosphate, Na_{3}PO_{4}.

In addition to Na_{3}P, five other binary compositions of sodium and phosphorus are known: NaP, Na_{3}P_{7}, Na_{3}P_{11}, NaP_{7}, and NaP_{15}.

== Structure and Properties ==
The compound crystallizes in a hexagonal motif, often called the sodium arsenide structure. Like K_{3}P, solid Na_{3}P features pentacoordinate P centers.

== Preparation ==
The first preparation of Na_{3}P was first reported in the mid-19th century. French researcher, Alexandre Baudrimont prepared sodium phosphide by treating molten sodium with phosphorus pentachloride.

8 Na_{(l)} + PCl_{5} → 5 NaCl + Na_{3}P

Many different routes to Na_{3}P have been described. Due to its flammability and toxicity, Na_{3}P (and related salts) is often prepared and used in situ. White phosphorus is reduced by sodium-potassium alloy:

P_{4} + 12 Na → 4 Na_{3}P

Phosphorus reacts with sodium in an autoclave at 150 °C for 5 hours to produce Na_{3}P.

Alternatively the reaction can be conducted at normal pressures but using a temperatures gradient to generate nonvolatile Na_{x}P phases (x < 3) that then react further with sodium. In some cases, an electron-transfer agent, such as naphthalene, is used. In such applications, the naphthalene forms the soluble sodium naphthalenide, which reduces the phosphorus.

== Uses ==
Sodium phosphide is a source of the highly reactive and highly basic phosphide anion. The material is insoluble in all solvents but reacts as a slurry with acids and related electrophiles to give derivatives of the type PM_{3}:

Na_{3}P + 3 E^{+} → E_{3}P (E = H, Me_{3}Si)

The trimethylsilyl derivative is volatile (b.p. 30-35 C @ 0.001 mm Hg) and soluble. It serves as a soluble equivalent to "P^{3−}".

Indium phosphide, a semiconductor arises by treating in-situ generated "sodium phosphide" with indium(III) chloride in hot N,N’-dimethylformamide as solvent. In this process, the phosphide reagent is generated from sodium metal and white phosphorus, whereupon it immediately reacts with the indium salt:

Na_{3}P + InCl_{3} → InP + 3NaCl

polymerization of propene

== Precautions ==
Sodium phosphide is highly dangerous releasing toxic phosphine upon hydrolysis, a process that is so exothermic that fires result. The USDOT has forbidden the transportation of Na_{3}P on aircraft and trains due to the potential fire and toxic hazards.
