= Strontium nitride =

Identifiers
CAS Number	12033-82-8
3D model (JSmol)	Interactive image
ChemSpider	11189353
ECHA InfoCard	100.031.619
EC Number	234-795-2
PubChem CID	92028826
CompTox Dashboard (EPA)	DTXSID401014214
- InChI: InChI=1S/2N.3Sr/q2*-3;3*+2 Key: JQVXBVRQXDKXGS-UHFFFAOYSA-N
- SMILES: [N-3].[N-3].[Sr+2].[Sr+2].[Sr+2]

Properties
Chemical formula	Sr_{3}N_{2}
Molar mass	290.87 g/mol
Melting point	1,200 °C (2,190 °F; 1,470 K)
Solubility in water	reacts

Hazards
- GHS labelling
Pictograms	(GHS07: Exclamation mark)
Signal word	Warning
Hazard statements	H315, H319, H335
Precautionary statements	P261, P264, P271, P280, P302+P352, P304+P340, P305+P351+P338, P312, P321, P332+P313, P337+P313, P362, P403+P233, P405, P501
- Except where otherwise noted, data are given for materials in their standard state (at 25 °C [77 °F], 100 kPa). verify (what is ?) Infobox references

Strontium nitride, Sr_{3}N_{2}, is produced by burning strontium metal in air (resulting in a mixture with strontium oxide) or in nitrogen. Like other metal nitrides, it reacts with water to give strontium hydroxide and ammonia:

Sr_{3}N_{2} + 6 H_{2}O → 3 Sr(OH)_{2} + 2 NH_{3}

== See also ==
- Beryllium nitride
- Magnesium nitride
- Calcium nitride
- Barium nitride
