= Sodium arsenide =

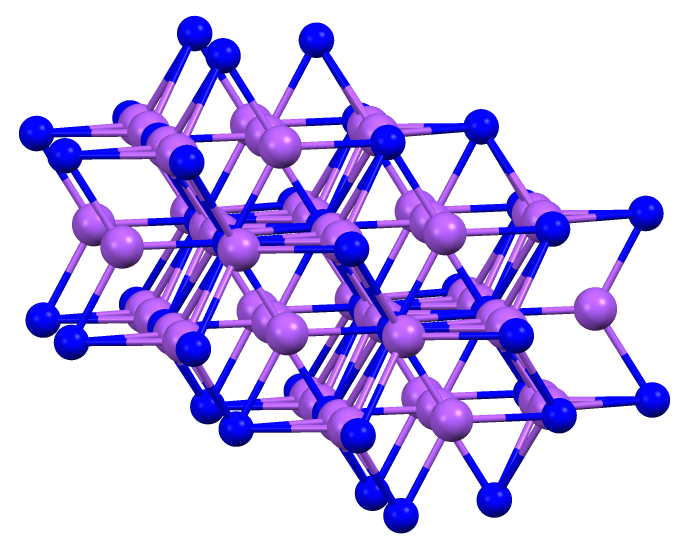

Names
- IUPAC name Disodioarsanylsodium

Identifiers
| CAS Number | 12044-25-6 |
| 3D model (JSmol) | Interactive image |
| ChemSpider | 74787 |
| ECHA InfoCard | 100.031.762 |
| EC Number | 234-952-5 |
| PubChem CID | 82879 |
| CompTox Dashboard (EPA) | DTXSID0065222 |
- InChI: InChI=1S/As.3Na Key: MMQSOEGXVXPNSH-UHFFFAOYSA-N
- SMILES: [Na][As]([Na])[Na]

Properties
| Chemical formula | Na_{3}As |
| Molar mass | 143.890903 g·mol^{−1} |
| Appearance | Violet brown solid |
| Density | 2.36 g/cm^{3} |
| Solubility in water | Hydrolysis |

Hazards
- Occupational safety and health (OHS/OSH)
| Main hazards | Toxic, releases AsH_{3} |

Related compounds
| Other anions | Sodium nitride; Sodium phosphide; Sodium antimonide |
| Other cations | Lithium arsenide; Calcium arsenide |
- Except where otherwise noted, data are given for materials in their standard state (at 25 °C [77 °F], 100 kPa). Infobox references

Sodium arsenide, also known as trisodium arsenide, is the inorganic compound of sodium and arsenic with the formula Na_{3}As. It is a dark colored solid that degrades upon contact with water or air. The compound is mainly of interest as exhibiting an archetypal structure. The normal pressure "sodium arsenide" phase is adopted by many alkali metal pnictides. At 3.6 GPa (520,000 psi), Na_{3}As adopts the Li_{3}Bi structure, which is another archetypal structure. Sodium arsenide is a crystalline solid used as a semiconductor and in photo optic applications. Its IUPAC name is disodioarsanylsodium.

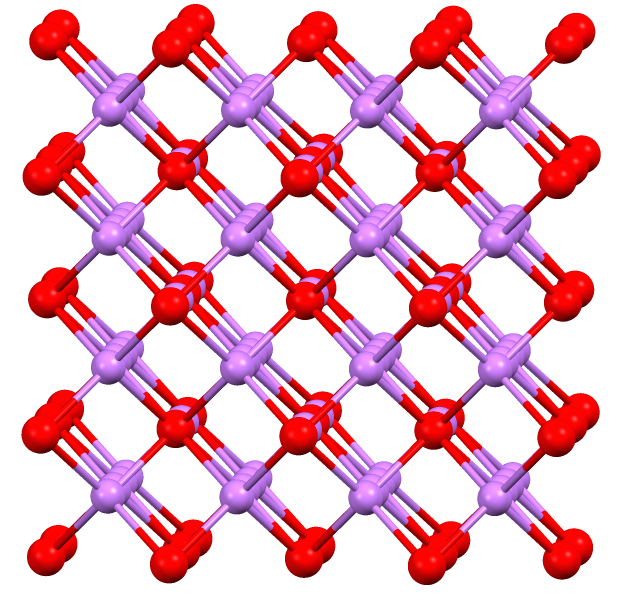
At high pressures, Na_{3}As adopts this cubic structure (the so-called Na_{3}As motif).

== Synthesis ==
It is prepared by passing 350–450 °C (662–842 °F) sodium vapor over preheated elemental arsenic in an evacuated tube and removing excess sodium at 450 °C (842 °F) under high vacuum.
