= Lithium nitride =

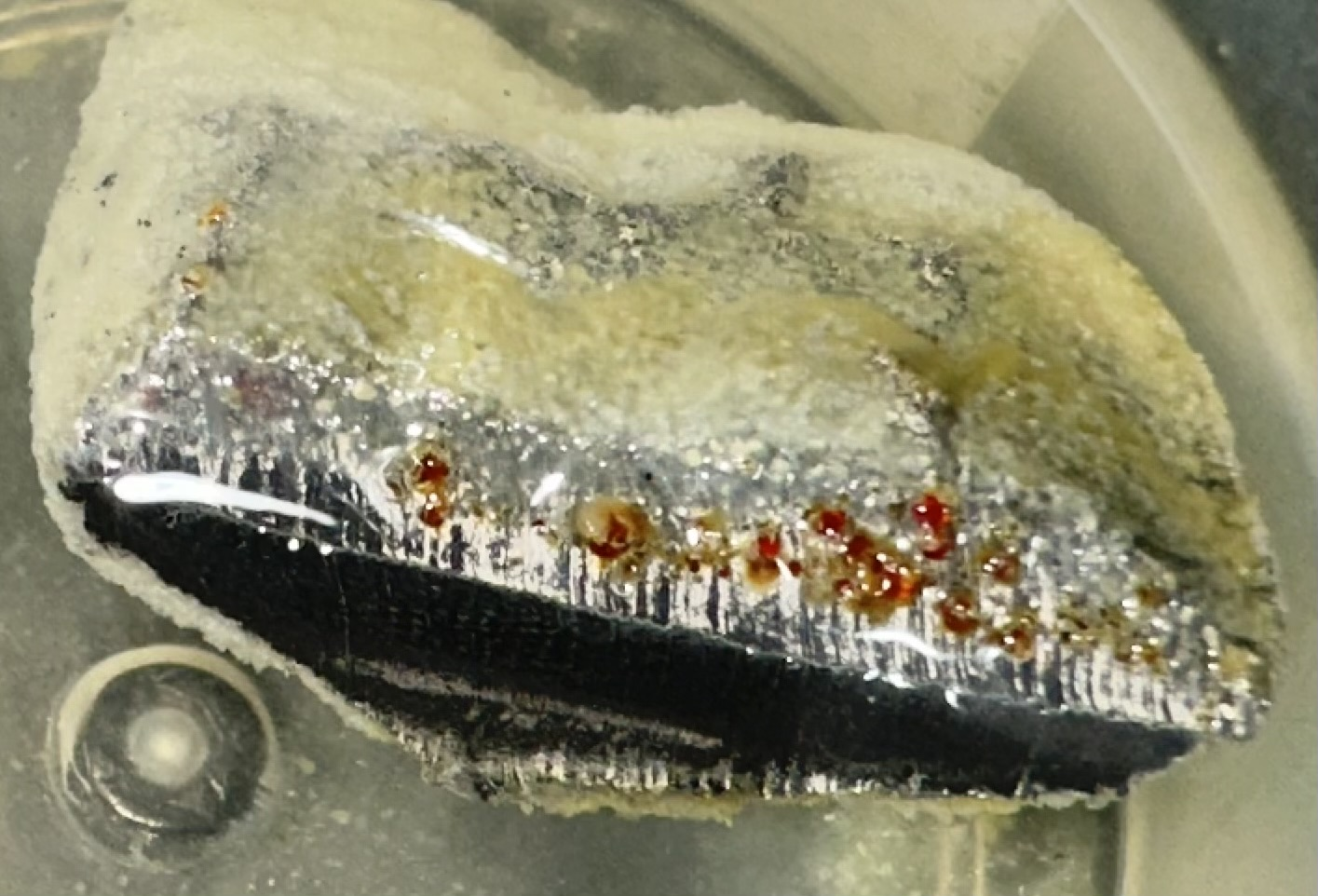
- Lithium nitride crystals on metallic lithium

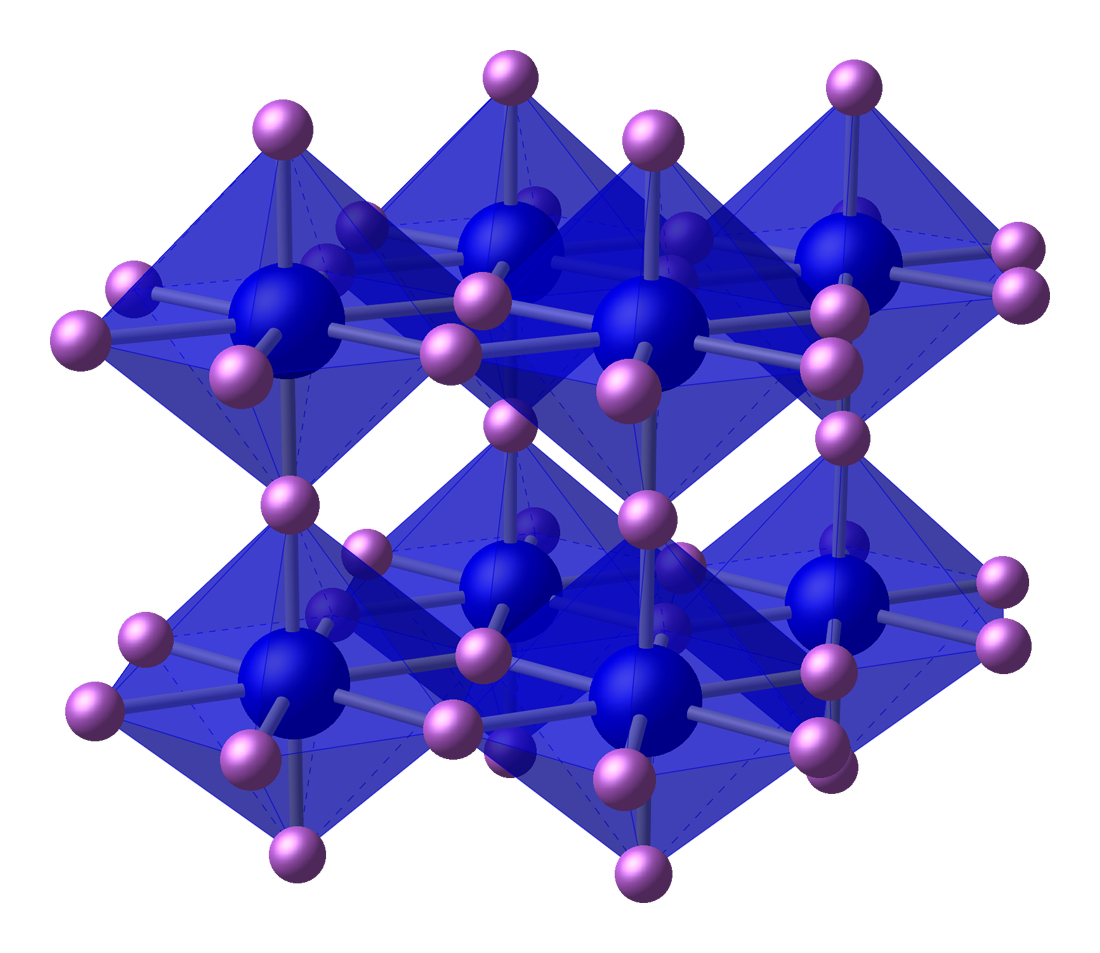
- Unit cell ball and stick model of lithium nitride __ Li^{+} __ N^{3−}

Names
- Preferred IUPAC name Lithium nitride
- Other names: Trilithium azanide; Trilithium nitride

Identifiers
CAS Number	26134-62-3
3D model (JSmol)	Interactive image; Interactive image
ChEBI	CHEBI:30525
ChemSpider	19054984
ECHA InfoCard	100.043.144
EC Number	247-475-2
Gmelin Reference	1156
PubChem CID	520242 erroneous
CompTox Dashboard (EPA)	DTXSID80894085
- InChI: InChI=1S/3Li.N Key: IDBFBDSKYCUNPW-UHFFFAOYSA-N; InChI=1S/3Li.N/q;;+1;-1 Key: AJUFTLIHDBAQOK-UHFFFAOYSA-N
- SMILES: [Li]N([Li])[Li]; [Li+].[Li][N-][Li]

Properties
Chemical formula	Li_{3}N
Molar mass	34.83 g·mol^{−1}
Appearance	Red-purple or reddish-pink crystals or powder
Density	1.270 g/cm^{3}
Melting point	813 °C (1,495 °F; 1,086 K)
Solubility in water	reacts
log P	3.24

Structure
Crystal structure	see text

Hazards
- Occupational safety and health (OHS/OSH)
Main hazards	reacts with water to release ammonia
- GHS labelling
Pictograms	(GHS02: Flammable) (GHS05: Corrosive)
Signal word	Danger
Hazard statements	H260, H314
Precautionary statements	P223, P231+P232, P260, P264, P280, P301+P330+P331, P303+P361+P353, P304+P340, P305+P351+P338, P310, P321, P335+P334, P363, P370+P378, P402+P404, P405, P501
NFPA 704 (fire diamond)	3 4 2 W

Related compounds
Other anions	Lithium phosphide; Lithium arsenide; Lithium fluoride; Lithium oxide; Tetralithiomethane; Lithium carbide
Other cations	Sodium nitride; Potassium nitride; Copper(I) nitride; Silver nitride; Thallium(I) nitride; Calcium nitride
Related compounds	Ammonia; Lithium amide; Lithium imide
- Except where otherwise noted, data are given for materials in their standard state (at 25 °C [77 °F], 100 kPa). verify (what is ?) Infobox references

Lithium nitride is an inorganic compound with the chemical formula Li_{3}N. It is the only stable alkali metal nitride. It is a reddish-pink solid with a high melting point.

== Preparation and handling ==
Lithium nitride is prepared by direct reaction of elemental lithium with nitrogen gas:

6 Li + N_{2} → 2 Li_{3}N

Instead of burning lithium metal in an atmosphere of nitrogen, a solution of lithium in liquid sodium metal can be treated with N_{2}.

Lithium nitride is an extremely strong base, so it must be protected from moisture as it reacts violently with water to produce ammonia:

Li_{3}N + 3 H_{2}O → 3 LiOH + NH_{3}

== Structure and properties ==
- alpha-Li_{3}N (stable at room temperature and pressure) has an unusual crystal structure that consists of two types of layers: one layer has the composition Li_{2}N^{−} contains 6-coordinate N centers and the other layer consists only of lithium cations.

Two other forms are known:

- beta-Li_{3}N, formed from the alpha phase at 0.42 GPa has the sodium arsenide (Na_{3}As) structure;
- gamma-Li_{3}N (same structure as lithium bismuthide Li_{3}Bi) forms from the beta form at 35 to 45 GPa.

Lithium nitride shows ionic conductivity for Li^{+}, with a value of c. 2×10^{−4} Ω^{−1}cm^{−1}, and an (intracrystal) activation energy of c. 0.26 eV (c. 24 kJ/mol). Hydrogen doping increases conductivity and doping with metal ions (Al, Cu, Mg) reduces it. The activation energy for lithium transfer across lithium nitride crystals (intercrystalline) has been determined to be higher, at c. 68.5 kJ/mol. The alpha form is a semiconductor with band gap of c. 2.1 eV.

== Reactions ==
Reacting lithium nitride with carbon dioxide results in amorphous carbon nitride (C_{3}N_{4}), a semiconductor, and lithium cyanamide (Li_{2}CN_{2}), a precursor to fertilizers, in an exothermic reaction.

Under hydrogen at around 200°C, Li_{3}N will react to form lithium amide.

Li_{3}N + 2 H_{2} → 2LiH + LiNH_{2}

At higher temperatures it will react further to form ammonia and lithium hydride.

LiNH_{2} + H_{2} → LiH + NH_{3}

Lithium imide can also be formed under certain conditions. Some research has explored this as a possible industrial process to produce ammonia since lithium hydride can be thermally decomposed back to lithium metal.

Lithium nitride has been investigated as a storage medium for hydrogen gas, as the reaction is reversible at 270 °C. Up to 11.5% by weight absorption of hydrogen has been achieved.

== See also ==
- WebElements
