= Tellurium nitride =

Tellurium nitride describes chemical compounds of Te containing N^{3−}. Efforts have been made toward the binary nitrides but the results are inconclusive and it appears that such materials are unstable. Still unconfirmed is Te_{4}N_{4}, which would be an analogue of tetraselenium tetranitride (Se_{4}N_{4}) and tetrasulfur tetranitride (S_{4}N_{4}). It has long been known that ammonia reacts with tellurium tetrachloride, which is similar to the method of synthesis of S_{4}N_{4}. The reaction of TeCl_{4} with a tetrahydrofuran solution of N(SiMe_{3})_{3} gives a well-defined tellurium nitride [Te_{6}N_{8}(TeCl_{4})_{4}(THF)_{4}] (THF = tetrahydrofuran).

== See also ==
- Tellurium tetraazide (TeN_{12})
