= Iberian Romani =

Iberian Romani or Ibero-Romani may refer to:

- Iberian Kale, an ethnic group native to Iberia and Southern France
- Iberian-Romance Romani (Caló) and Basque Romani (Erromintxela) languages (both regarded as Para-Romani)
