= Polynitrides =

Class of chemical compounds

Polynitrides are solid chemical compounds with a large amount of nitrogen, beyond what would be expected from valencies. Some with N_{2} ions are termed pernitrides. Azides are not considered polynitrides, although pentazolates are.

They are formed at high pressures and mostly at high temperature. Many are stable under high pressure, but some are metastable when decompressed to standard conditions. They are high energy density materials, capable of exploding with high power. Some are very hard, almost as strong as diamond.

Nitrogen anions can take the form of diazenide [N^{2−}_{2}], pentazolate [N^{−}_{5}], 1-dimensional chains [N^{2−}_{4}], hexazine dianion [N^{2−}_{6}], pernitride N^{4−}_{2} and even include dinitrogen molecules.

== List ==
Formula			Crystallography							Properties			References
Empirical	Structural	Notes	Crystal	Space group	Unit cell (Å)	Formula units (Z) (Note: Based on empirical formula)	Volume (Å^{3})	Density (g·cm^{−3})	At pressure (GPa) (Note: Zero denotes ambient pressure (1 bar = 0.0001 GPa))	Bulk modulus at zero pressure (K_{0}) (GPa)	Lowest observed pressure (GPa)	Comments	References
LiN	[Li^{+}]_{2}[N^{2−}_{2}]	diazenide	orthorhombic	Immm	a=3.1181 b=4.4372 c=10.7912	8	149.30		0		0	black, metallic luster	
LiN	[Li^{+}]_{2}[N^{2−}_{2}]	diazenide	orthorhombic	Cmcm	a=3.819 b=6.471 c=3.446	8	85.16		73.6	112(19) (Note: Extrapolated to zero pressure using the third-order Birch–Murnaghan equation of state)	19.0		
LiN_{2}	Li^{+}N^{−}_{2}	N^{−}_{2} dimers	hexagonal	P6_{3}/mmc	a=2.631 c=7.615	2	45.64		21.2	63(4)	4.6	white	
LiN_{5}	Li^{+}N^{−}_{5}	pentazolate	monoclinic	P2	a=3.808 b=3.838 c=2.410 β=99.84°	1	34.70		73.6		0 (Note: Unknown polymorph); 73.6 (XRD)		
tr-BeN_{4}	Be^{2+}[poly-N^{2−}_{4}]	1D chains, N_{4} torsion angle = 17.1°	triclinic (2D layers)	P1̅	a=3.275 b=4.212 c=3.704 α=103.43º β=105.61º γ=111.86º	1	42.4		0		0		
tr-BeN_{4}	Be^{2+}[poly-N^{2−}_{4}]	1D chains, N_{4} torsion angle = 17.1°	triclinic	P1̅	a=2.4062 b=3.5119 c=3.506 α=104.29° β=111.39° γ=96.71°	1	26.02		83.5		0		
m-BeN_{4}		2D infinite sheets of fused N_{10} rings	monoclinic	P2_{1}/c	a=3.283 b=3.2765 c=4.8185 β=99.67°	2	51.10		96.8		96.8		
Amm2-CN_{6} (Note: predicted structure)	2D			Amm2									
Amm2-CN_{10}	2D			Amm2									
NaN_{2}	Na^{+}N^{−}_{2}	N^{−}_{2} dimers	tetragonal	P4/mmm	a=3.001 c=4.101	1	36.93		4.0		2.8	black, metallic luster	
Na_{3}N_{8}	[Na^{+}]_{3}[N_{2}^{3/4−}]_{4}	N_{2}^{0.75-} dimers	tetragonal	I4_{1}/amd	a=4.9597 c=16.29	4	400.7		27.6		7.7	black, metallic luster	
Na_{2}N_{5}	[Na^{+}]_{2}[N^{2−}_{5}]	pentazolate-derived dianion	monoclinic	Pm	a=4.781 b=2.5873 c=4.934 β=119.6°	1	53.1		50.0		18 (Raman)		
NaN_{5}	Na^{+}N^{−}_{5}	pentazolate	orthorhombic	Pmn2_{1}	a=5.455 b=2.836 c=5.662	2	87.6		52.9		12 (Raman) 25 (XRD)		
NaN_{7}	Na^{+}N^{−}_{5}·N_{2}	pentazolate nitrogen-inclusion	monoclinic	P2_{1}/n	a=10.321 b=8.672 c=11.0409 β=91.70°	16	987.8		52.9		40		
α-Mg_{2}N_{4}	[Mg^{2+}]_{2}[a'-N^{4−}_{4}][b'-N^{4−}_{4}]	cis-tetranitrogen tetraanion	monoclinic	P2_{1}/n	a=7.5182 b=6.5426 c=13.4431 β=130.080°	2	505.95		0		0		
β-Mg_{2}N_{4}	[Mg^{2+}]_{2}[a-N^{4−}_{4}][b-N^{4−}_{4}]	cis-tetranitrogen tetraanion	monoclinic	P2_{1}/n	a=7.114 b=5.824 c=8.804 β=104.04°	2	354.0		58.5		2.3		
MgN_{4}	Mg^{2+}[poly-N^{2−}_{4}]	1D chains, N_{4} torsion angle = 0° isoelectronic to polythiazyl cis-polyacetylene geometry	orthorhombic	Ibam	a=3.5860 b=7.526 c=5.1098	1	137.90		58.5		0.9 (Raman); 58.5 (XRD)		
SiN_{2}	Si^{4+}N^{4−}_{2}	pernitride	cubic	Pa3̅	a=4.1205	4	69.96	5.327	140		140		
K_{3}N_{8}	[K^{+}]_{3}[N_{2}^{3/4−}]_{4}	N_{2}^{0.75-} dimers; isostructural to Na_{3}N_{8}	tetragonal	I4_{1}/amd	a=5.331 c=17.552	4	498.8		27		27	reflective	
K_{2}N_{6}	[K^{+}]_{2}[N^{2−}_{6}]	planar hexazine dianion	hexagonal	P6/mmm	a=5.281 c=2.661	1	64.27		50		20 (Raman); 21 (XRD)	reflective	
K_{9}N_{56}	[K^{+}]_{18}[N^{4−}_{6}][N^{−}_{5}]_{14}·18N_{2}	planar hexazine tetraanion; pentazolate; nitrogen-inclusion	orthorhombic	Ibam	a=5.2380 b=34.560 c=23.205	8	4200.7		61		32		
Sc_{2}N_{6}			triclinic	P1̅	a=2.9170 b=4.328 c=4.812 α=99.36 β=104.29 γ=99.52	1	56.73	5.093	78			metallic	
Sc_{2}N_{8}			monoclinic	P2_{1}/c	a=3.3278 b=5.6802 c=7.3964 β=98.905°	2	138.13	4.857				metallic	
ScN_{5}			monoclinic	P2_{1}/m	a=3.3225 b=6.440 c=3.7067 β=104.34	2	76.84	4.971				indirect semiconductor	
Sc_{4}N_{3}			cubic	Fm3̅m	a= 4.2492	4	233.9	6.301	125				
TiN_{2}	Ti^{4+}N^{4−}_{2}	pernitride	tetragonal	I4/mcm	a=4.334 c=5.294	4	99.44		0	385(7) (Note: Modeled using the third-order Birch–Murnaghan equation of state)	0		
VN_{2}	V^{4+}N^{4−}_{2}	pernitride	tetragonal	I4/mcm	a=4.3015 c=4.9827	4	92.195	5.6883	73.3	347	0		
MnN_{4}		chains	triclinic	P1̅	a=3.58 b=3.70 c=5.01 α=94.2° β=111.2° γ=71.6°		58.7		108 GPa				
FeN_{2}			orthorhombic	Pnnm	a=4.431 b=3.722 c=2.421	2	39.93		58.5				
FeN_{4}	Fe^{2+}[poly-N^{2−}_{4}]	1D chains, N_{4} torsion angle = 36° polytetrazene geometry	triclinic		a=2.5089 b=3.524 c=3.5409 105.08 110.26 92.03	1	28.09		106				
CoN_{2}			orthorhombic	Pnnm					31 GPa	216			
CoN_{3}			orthorhombic	Pnma	a=2.555 b=3.463 c=10.655				90-120 GPa				
CoN_{5}			monoclinic	C2/c	a=4.951 b=6.910 c=8.062 β=95.77				90-120 GPa				
NiN_{2}		pernitride	orthorhombic	Pnnm					36 GPa				
NiN_{2}		diazenide	tetragonal	P4/mbm									
ZnN_{4}		1D chain	orthorhombic	Ibam					14-130 GPa				
YN_{6}		N_{18}^{9+} rings							100 GPa				
Y(N_{5})_{3}·N_{2}	Y^{3+}[N^{−}_{5}]_{3}·N_{2}	pentazolate nitrogen-inclusion	monoclinic	P2_{1}/c	a=9.617 b=6.932 c=6.609 β=95.13°	4	438.8	5.092	125 GPa				
Y_{2}N_{11}		N-double helix							100 GPa				
Y_{5}N_{14}			tetragonal	P4/mbm	a=8.451 c=4.7316	2	337.93	6.296	50				
Nb_{2}N_{3}			orthorhombic	Pnma	a=7.897 b=2.857 c=7.660	4		8.755	56 GPa				
NbN_{2}			tetragonal	I4mm	a=2.8365 c=11.444	4		8.723	80 GPa				
NbN_{4}			monoclinic	P2_{1}/n	a=4.4827 b=5.4543 c=5.439 β=101.47	4		7.59	105:100-120 GPa				
NbN_{5}			orthorhombic	Fdd2	a=11.833 b=13.870 c=3.6001	16		7.323	100-120 GPa				
RuN_{2}	Ru^{4+}N^{4−}_{2}	pernitride	orthorhombic	Pnnm							0		
RhN_{2}	Rh^{4+}N^{4−}_{2}	pernitride	orthorhombic	Pnnm						235	0		
RhN_{2}		pernitride	monoclinic	P2_{1}/c									
PdN_{2}	Pd^{4+}N^{4−}_{2}	pernitride		Pa3̅							13		
AgN_{7}	N_{5} ring + N_{2}			P1					15 GPa		5	black	
AgN_{5}				P2_{1}/c					15 GPa				
AgN_{4}				P1̅					26.3 GPa		12		
SbN_{4}	Sb_{2}^{5+}N_{8}^{10-}	N_{8} chains	monoclinic	P2_{1}/n					100-120 GPa				
CsN_{5}	Cs^{+}N^{−}_{5}	pentazolate		Pbca									
CsN_{5}			triclinic	P1̅									
LaN_{8}		N_{18} rings	trigonal	R3̅									
LaN_{8}		N_{8} cage	tetragonal	P4/n								high energy density	
Ce_{2}N_{6}		N_{4} zigzags		C2/m	a=5.717 b=4.661 c=6.548 β=93.270		174.20		ambient				
CeN_{4}		chains		I4_{1}/a	a=6.711 c=2.879						0		
CeN_{6}		hexazine		R3̅m	a=5.890 c=4.108								
CeN_{14}		sheet	hexagonal	P6mm	a=5.748 c=2.447								
CeN_{17}		sheet	hexagonal	P6mm	a=6.111 c=2.842								
Hf_{2}N_{11}		N double helix	hexagonal	P6_{4}22									
TaN_{4}		N_{4} chains	monoclinic	P2_{1}/n					100				
TaN_{5}		branched infinite chains	orthorhombic	Fdd2					100				
WN_{8}·N_{2}		1 D chain, N_{2} molecules	orthorhombic	Immm									
WN_{6}		N_{6}^{6-} hexaazacyclohexane derivative	rhombohedral	R3̅m									
ReN_{2}	[Re^{5+}]_{2}[N^{4−}_{2}][N^{3−}]_{2}	pernitride nitride	monoclinic	P2_{1}/c	a=3.625 b=6.407 c=4.948 β=111.48°				0	330	0	very hard	
ReN_{2}	Re^{4+}N_{2}^{4-}	pernitride	tetragonal	P4/mbm					175				
ReN_{8}·N_{2}		1 D chain, N_{2} molecules	orthorhombic	Immm					105-130 GPa				
OsN_{2}	Os^{4+}N^{4−}_{2}	pernitride	orthorhombic	Pnnm						358	0		
Os_{5}N_{28}·3N_{2}		1D chain, N_{2} molecules	orthorhombic	Pnnm									
IrN_{2}	Ir^{4+}N^{4−}_{2}	pernitride	monoclinic	P2_{1}/c						428	0		
PtN_{2}	Pt^{4+}N^{4−}_{2}	pernitride		Pa3̅						372	0		
PbN_{2}	Pb^{2+}N^{2−}_{2}	diazenide (provisional, N_{2}^{x-} dimers)	tetragonal	I4/mcm						65 (Note: Extrapolated to zero pressure using the second-order Birch–Murnaghan equation of state)	15		
