= Iron nitrides =

Chemical compound made of iron and nitrogen

Iron nitrides are inorganic chemical compounds of iron and nitrogen.

== Chemical properties ==
Iron has five nitrides observed at ambient conditions: Fe_{2}N, Fe_{3}N_{4}, Fe_{4}N, Fe_{7}N_{3} and Fe_{16}N_{2}. They are crystalline, metallic solids. Group 7 and group 8 transition metals form nitrides that decompose at relatively low temperatures—iron nitride, Fe_{2}N, decomposes with loss of molecular nitrogen at around 400 °C and formation of lower-nitrogen content iron nitrides. They are insoluble in water. At high pressure, stability and formation of new nitrogen-rich nitrides (N/Fe ratio at least one) were suggested and later discovered. These include the FeN, FeN_{2} and FeN_{4} solids which become thermodynamically stable above 17.7 GPa, 72 GPa and 106 GPa, respectively.

== Health hazards ==
When heated to decomposition or exposed to humidity, iron nitride may emit toxic fumes of ammonia. It is considered a moderate explosion hazard. Inhalation of iron nitride dust or powder may cause irritation to the respiratory system and possibly acute iron poisoning or pneumoconiosis.

== Research applications ==
Colloidal solution of magnetic iron nitride nanoparticles is a way to create ferrofluids.

Iron nitrides also make the strongest naturally magnetic material.
