= Tert-Butylphosphaacetylene =

tert-Butylphosphaacetylene
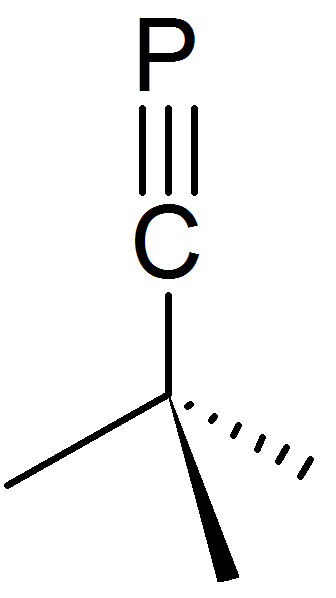

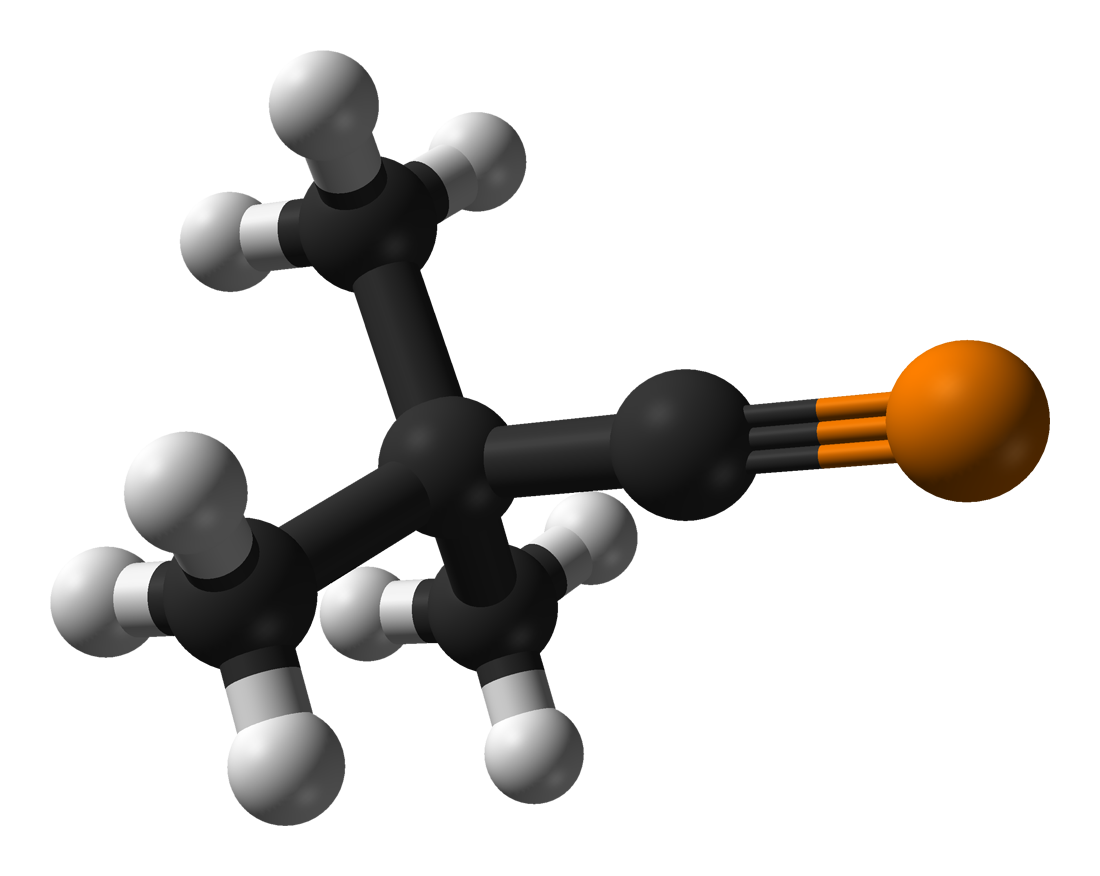

Names
- Preferred IUPAC name (2,2-Dimethylpropylidyne)phosphane

Identifiers
CAS Number	78129-68-7
3D model (JSmol)	Interactive image
ChemSpider	127788
PubChem CID	144845
CompTox Dashboard (EPA)	DTXSID00228782
- InChI: InChI=1S/C5H9P/c1-5(2,3)4-6/h1-3H3 Key: PXQNAKPBTIQCTI-UHFFFAOYSA-N; InChI=1/C5H9P/c1-5(2,3)4-6/h1-3H3 Key: PXQNAKPBTIQCTI-UHFFFAOYAA
- SMILES: P#CC(C)(C)C

Properties
Chemical formula	C_{5}H_{9}P
Molar mass	100.101 g·mol^{−1}
- Except where otherwise noted, data are given for materials in their standard state (at 25 °C [77 °F], 100 kPa). verify (what is ?) Infobox references

tert-Butylphosphaacetylene is an organophosphorus compound. Abbreviated t-BuCP, it was the first example of an isolable phosphaalkyne. Prior to its synthesis, the double bond rule had suggested that elements of Period 3 and higher were unable to form double or triple bonds with lighter main group elements because of weak orbital overlap. The synthesis of t-BuCP discredited much of the double bond rule and opened new studies into the formation of unsaturated phosphorus compounds.

== Synthesis and reactions ==
The synthesis of t-BuCP entails the reaction of pivaloyl chloride and P(SiMe_{3})_{3}. The reaction proceeds via the intermediacy of a bis(trimethylsilyl)pivaloylphosphine, which undergoes a 1,3-silyl shift to form E- or Z-phosphoalkene isomers. Carrying out the phosphoalkene reaction in diglyme at 20 °C in the presence of catalytic amounts of solid NaOH forms the final t-BuCP product.

Me_{3}CC(O)Cl + P(SiMe_{3})_{3} → Me_{3}CC(O)P(SiMe_{3})_{2} + Me_{3}SiCl
Me_{3}CC(O)P(SiMe_{3})_{2} → Me_{3}CCP + O(SiMe_{3})_{2}

== Other phosphaalkynes ==
Phosphaalkynes possessing a C≡P bonded to bulky aryl groups are also known, e.g. Mes*C≡P and P≡C(Tript)C≡P are known to possess C≡P bond lengths of 1.516 and 1.532 Å, respectively (see below). While t-BuCP possesses a carbon-phosphorus bond length of 1.536 Å and a first ionization potential (π MO) of 9.70eV, H-C≡P possesses a C≡P bond length of 1.5421Å and a first ionization potential (π MO) of 10.79eV.

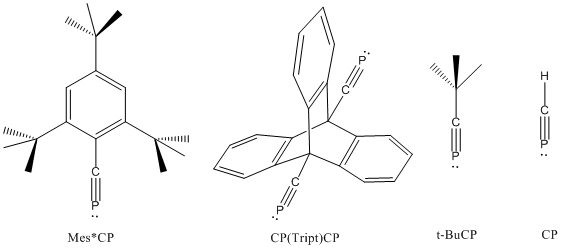
Image center Chem317CPexs

These physical properties produce characteristic reactivity differences between the two species: tert-butylphosphaacetylene is a stable volatile liquid (b.p. 61 °C), and phosphaacetylene readily reacts to form elemental phosphorus. It has been proposed that isophosphaalkynes (R-P≡C) are produced as intermediates during the syntheses of phosphaalkynes. Such isomeric species have never been isolated.

== Reactions ==
With their characteristic C-P triple bonds, the phosphorus atoms of phosphaalkynes such as tert-butylphosphaacetylene exhibit reactivities similar to nitriles, despite the significant differences between the radii of P (1.09 Å) and N (0.71 Å). At temperatures above 130 °C, the phosphaalkyne undergoes cyclotetramerization. To some extent its reactivity more closely resembles the reactions of alkynes.

tert-Butylphosphaacetylene can bind to metals via various coordination modes to give inorganic and organometallic complexes. These complexes utilize either the triple bond or the nonbonding electrons on P.

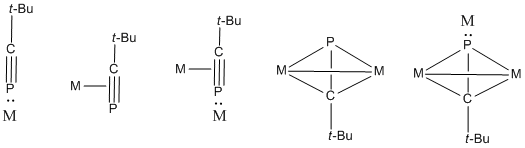
Image center Chem317CPbindingformations

The higher electronegativity of carbon (2.5) over phosphorus (2.2) leads to polarized C^{δ−}≡P^{δ+} bonds, which induces protonation at its carbon center. Its variety of coordination geometries enable tert-butylphosphaacetylene to participate in several types of reactions, including 1,2-additions of halogenated compounds.

Organolithium compounds and enophiles can also react with C-P triple bonds, along with [2+1], [2+2], [2+3], and [2+4] cycloadditions. tert-Butylphosphaacetylene also undergoes a homo Diels-Alder cycloaddition reaction.
