= Erromintxela language =

Language with Basque syntax and Romani vocabulary

Erromintxela
- Erromintxela
- Native to: Spain, France
- Region: Basque Country
- Ethnicity: Erromintxela
- Native speakers: (500–1,000 cited 1997)
- Language family: mixed Basque–Kalderash Romani

Language codes
- ISO 639-3: emx
- Glottolog: erro1240

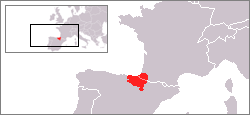
Location of the Basque provinces within Spain and France

Erromintxela (Basque pronunciation: [eromintʃela]) is the distinctive language of a group of Romani living in the Basque Country, who also go by the name Erromintxela. It is sometimes called Basque Caló or Errumantxela in English; caló vasco, romaní vasco, or errominchela in Spanish; and euskado-rromani or euskado-romani in French. Although detailed accounts of the language date to the end of the 19th century, linguistic research began only in the 1990s.

The Erromintxela are the descendants of a 15th-century wave of Kalderash Roma, who entered the Basque Country via France. Both ethnically and linguistically, they are distinct from the Caló-speaking Romani people in Spain and the Cascarot Romani people of the Northern Basque Country. Erromintxela is a mixed language (referred to as Para-Romani in Romani linguistics), deriving most of its vocabulary from Kalderash Romani but using Basque grammar, similar to the way the Angloromani language of the Roma in England mixes Romani vocabulary and English grammar. The development of the mixed language was facilitated by the unusually deep integration of the Erromintxela people into Basque society and the resultant bilingualism in Basque. The language is in decline; most of the perhaps 1000 remaining speakers live on the coast of Labourd and in the mountainous regions of Soule, Navarre, Gipuzkoa and Biscay.

== Name ==
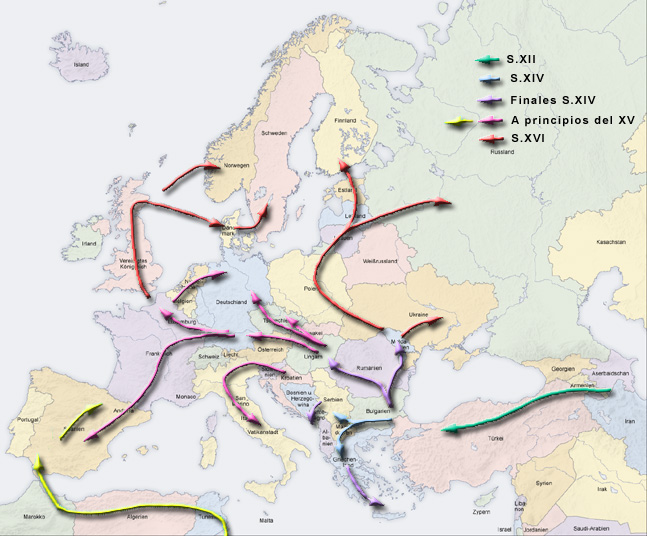
The migration of Romani people through the Middle East and Northern Africa to Europe

The origin of the name Erromintxela is unclear and may be of relatively recent origin; Basque speakers had previously grouped the Erromintxela under more general terms for Romani such as ijitoak "Egyptians", ungrianok "Hungarians", or buhameak "Bohemians". However, a number of authors believe it to be a Basque rendering of the French name romanichel or romané-michel, a name attested primarily in the vicinity of the Pyrenees and in particular the Northern Basque Country. Romanichel is in turn a French rendering of the Romani phrase Romani čel "Romani person". Though now uncommon in France, it is found in the names of the British Ròmanichal and the Scandinavian Romanisæl, all descendants, like the Erromintxela, of a group of Roma who had migrated to France.

Early attestations of the name in Basque include Errama-itçéla, Erroumancel, later errumanzel and erremaitzela. The initial e- is the Basque prosthetic vowel, which was added at a time that no Basque word was allowed to begin with an r-. The final -a is the absolutive case suffix, which is used when citing a name. If that etymology is correct, it is a rare case of a native Romani name for themselves (an endonym) being borrowed by another language.

The people identify themselves as ijitoak, Basque for "gypsies", but more specifically as Erromintxela, in contrast to the Caló Romani, whom they refer to as the xango-gorriak, Basque for "red-legs".

== State of the language ==
There are currently an estimated 500 speakers in the Southern Basque Country in Spain, approximately 2% of a population of 21,000 Romanis, and another estimated 500 in France. In Spain the remaining fluent speakers are elderly people mostly over the age of 80; some are equally fluent in Spanish, Basque, or Caló. Middle-aged Erromintxela are mostly passive bilinguals, and the youngest speak only Basque or Spanish. In the Northern Basque Country, however, the language is still being passed on to children. The percentage of speakers among Spanish Erromintxela are higher than 2%, as large numbers of Caló-speaking Romanis moved to the Basque Country in the intense period of industrialisation in the 20th century.

== Literary production ==
To date, there has been little literary production in the language. The most notable works are a poem by Jon Mirande entitled "Kama-goli" in his 1997 anthology Orhoituz and the 1999 novel Agirre zaharraren kartzelaldi berriak by Koldo Izagirre Urreaga with the main character using the language.

== History ==
The Erromintxela arrived in the Basque Country in the 15th century speaking Kalderash Romani. They integrated much more deeply into Basque society than other Romani groups. In the process, they acquired the Basque language and adopted aspects of Basque culture such as increased rights of women and important traditions such as bertsolaritza (extemporaneous poetic song) and pelota (the national Basque ballgame). Muñoz and Lopez de Mungia suspect that the morphological and phonological similarities between Romani and Basque facilitated the adoption of Basque grammar by the bilingual Romanis.

It appears that many Romanis chose to stay in the Basque Country to escape persecution elsewhere in Europe. Nonetheless, even here they were not safe from persecution. For example, the Royal Council of Navarre in 1602 passed an edict to round up all "vagabonds" (meaning Romani), who were to be condemned to 6 years of galley duty. By the 18th century however attitudes had changed, and the emphasis shifted towards integration. In 1780–1781 the Courts of Navarre passed Law 23, which called for "the authorities to take care of them, find them locations for settlement and honest occupations and ways of living..."

== Research ==
The oldest account of the language dates to 1855, when the French ethnographer Justin Cenac-Moncaut located the Erromintxela primarily in the Northern Basque Country. The oldest coherent Erromintxela text, a poem entitled Kama-goli, published by Basque writer Jon Mirande in a collection of Basque poetry, only dates to ca. 1960.

Alexandre Baudrimont's 40-page study Vocabulaire de la langue des Bohémiens habitant les pays basques français of 1862, the most extensive of the early accounts, covers both vocabulary and aspects of grammar. He worked with two female informants, a mother and her daughter from the Uhart-Mixe area near Saint-Palais, whom he describes as highly fluent. Unfortunately, he was only able to conduct a single session as the women were then told not to cooperate further for the fear of outsiders prying into the secrets of the Romani. There is a certain degree of confusion in Baudrimont's publication—he himself states that he could not always be certain the correct forms were elicited. For example, most of the verb forms he tried to elicit lack the verbal -tu ending and appear to be participles.

The French sociologist Victor de Rochas refers to the Romani in the Northern Basque Country speaking Basque, rather than French, in his 1876 Les Parias de France et d'Espagne (cagots et bohémiens). The Canon Jean-Baptiste Daranatz published a wordlist in the periodical Eskualdun Ona in 1906 and in 1921 Berraondo and Oyarbide carried out some research. Although labelled gitano (Spanish for 'gypsy') or bohémien / gitan (French for 'gypsy'), some data can also be found in Azkue's 1905 dictionary and Pierre Lhande's 1926 dictionary, both of which list a number of words identifiable as Erromintxela.

Little more was done until the late 20th century. In 1986 Federico Krutwig published a short article in the Revista Internacional de Estudios Vascos entitled "Los gitanos vascos", with a short word list and a brief analysis of the language's morphology. However, the most detailed research to date was carried out by Basque philologist Josune Muñoz and historian Elias Lopez de Mungia, who began their work in the Southern Basque Country in 1996 at the behest of the Romani organisation Kalé Dor Kayiko, with support from the Euskaltzaindia and the University of the Basque Country. Kalé Dor Kayiko, who had been working to promote the Romani language, was alerted to the existence of Erromintxela in the 1990s through an article by the historian Alizia Stürtze, Agotak, juduak eta ijitoak Euskal Herrian "Agotes, Jews, and Gypsies in the Basque Country". Kalé Dor Kayiko intends to continue research into the language, attitudes, identity, and history of the Erromintxela people in the less well researched provinces of Navarre and the Northern Basque Country.

== Linguistic features ==
The research by Muñoz and Lopez de Mungia has confirmed that Erromintxela is not derived from Caló, the mixed Spanish-Romani language spoken throughout Spain, but is instead based on Kalderash Romani and the Basque language. The vocabulary appears to be almost exclusively Romani in origin; the grammar however, both morphology and syntax, derives from various Basque dialects. Few traces appear to remain of Romani grammatical structures. The language is incomprehensible to speakers of both Basque and of Caló.

Typologically, Erromintxela displays the same features as the Basque dialects it derives its grammatical structures from. Its case marking follows the ergative–absolutive pattern where the subject of an intransitive verb is in the absolutive case (which is unmarked), the same case being used for the direct object of a transitive verb. The subject of a transitive verb is marked with the ergative case. Similarly, auxiliary verbs agree with the subject and any direct object and indirect object present and verb forms are marked for allocutive (i.e. a marker is used to indicate the gender of the addressee).

Since both Erromintxela and Caló derive from Romani, many Erromintxela words are similar to Spanish Caló and Catalan Caló.

Erromintxela	Caló	Root	Meaning
baro	varó/baró	baró	large, big
dui(l)	dui	dúj	two
guruni	guruñí	gurumni	cow
kani(a)	casní, caní	khajní	hen, chicken
latxo, latxu	lachó (fem. lachí)	lačhó	good
mandro(a)	manró, marró	manró	bread
nazaro, lazaro	nasaló (fem. nasalí)	nasvalo	ill
panin(a)	pañí	paní	water
pinro(a), pindru(a)	pinrró	punró	foot
trin, tril	trin	trin	three
zitzai(a)	chichai	čičaj	cat

=== Phonology ===
According to Baudrimont's description of 1862 and modern southern sources, Erromintxela appears to have, at maximum, the sound system below. Southern speakers appear not to have the rounded vowel /y/ or the consonant /θ/, in line with north–south differences in Basque, and it is not clear if the northern distinction between /ɡ/ and /ɣ/ also exists in the south.

Table of consonant phonemes of Erromintxela
		Labial		Coronal					Dorsal			Glottal
		Labial		Dental	Lamino- dental		Apico- alveolar	Post- alveolar	Palatal	Velar		Glottal
Nasal		m /m/					n /n/		ñ /ɲ/			
Plosive		p /p/	b /b/		t /t/	d /d/				k /k/	g /ɡ/	
Affricate					tz /ts̻/		ts /ts̺/	tx /tʃ/				
Fricative		f /f/		/θ/	z /s̻/		s /s̺/	x /ʃ/		j /x/	/ɣ/	h /h/
Lateral							l /l/		ll /ʎ/			
Rhotic	Trill						rr /r/					
Rhotic	Tap						r /ɾ/					

	Front		Back
	unrounded	rounded	Back
Close	i /i/	ü (/y/)	u /u/
Close-mid	e /e/		o /o/
Open	a /a/		

Baudrimont uses a semi-phonetic system with the following diverging conventions:

Baudrimont	u	ȣ	y	Δ	Γ	χ	sh	tsh	z
IPA	/y/	/u/	/j/	/θ/	/ɣ/	/x/	/ʃ/	/tʃ/	/z/

=== Morphology ===
Examples of morphological features in Erromintxela:

Erromintxela	Basque	Root	Function in Erromintxela	Example
-a	-a	Basque -a	absolutive suffix	phiria "the pot"
-ak	-ak	Basque -ak	plural suffix	sokak "overcoats"
-(a)n	-(a)n	Basque -(a)n	locative suffix	khertsiman "in the tavern"
-(a)z	-(a)z	Basque -(a)z	instrumental suffix	jakaz "with fire"
-(e)k	-(e)k	Basque -(e)k	ergative suffix	hire dui ankhai koloek "your two black eyes"
-ena	-ena	Basque -ena	superlative suffix	loloena "reddest"
-(e)ko(a)	-(e)ko(a)	Basque -(e)ko(a)	local genitive suffix	muirako "of the mouth"
-(e)rak	-(e)rat (Northern Basque)	Basque -(e)ra(t)	allative suffix	txaribelerak "to the bed"
-pen	-pen	Basque -pen	1 suffix denoting act or effect 2 under	
-ra	-ra	Basque -ra	allative suffix	penintinora "to the little stream"
-tu	-tu	Basque -tu	verb forming suffix	dekhatu "to see"
-tzea	-tzea	Basque -tzea	nominalizer	
-tzen	-t(z)en	Basque -t(z)en	imperfect suffix	kherautzen "doing"

=== Verb formation ===
Most verbs have a Romani root plus the Basque verb forming suffix -tu. Examples of Erromintxela verbs are given below. (Forms given in angle brackets indicate spellings in the sources which are no longer in use. Basque is included for comparison.)

Erromintxela	Basque	Romani	English translation
brikhindu	euria izan	brišínd	to rain
burrinkatu	harrapatu	(astaráv)	to catch
dikelatu, dekhatu	ikusi	dikháv	to see
erromitu (eŕomitu)	ezkondu		to marry
gazinain kheautu	haur egin		to give birth (lit. make a child)
goli kherautu, goli keautu	kantatu	(gilábav)	to sing (lit. make a song)
kamatu	maitatu	kamáv	to love
kerau, keau, kherautu, keautu	egin	keráv	1 to do, make 2 auxiliary
kurratu	lan egin	butjí keráv	to work; J.M. de O. glosses this as "hit" but compare various Basque expressions using jo in the sense of "getting down to, making an effort"
kurrautu ⟨kuŕautu⟩	jo		to hit
kuti	begiratu	dikáv	to look
letu	hartu	lav	to take
mahutu, mautu	hil	mu(da)ráv	to die, kill
mangatu	eskatu	mangáv	to ask for, beg
mukautu	bukatu		to end
najel-egin	ihes egin		to escape
najin	bukatu		to end
papira-keautu	idatzi	(skirív, ramóv)	to write (lit. make paper)
parrautu ⟨paŕautu⟩	ebaki		to cut
pekatu	egosi	pakáv	to cook
pekhautu	erre		to burn
piautu	edan	pjav	to drink
tarautu, tazautu	ito		to strangle
teilaitu	jan	xav	to eat
tetxalitu, texalitu	ibili		to walk
txanatu	jakin	žanáv	to know
txiautu			to ram in, push in
txoratu, xorkatu ⟨s̃orkatu⟩, txoatu	lapurtu, ebatsi, harrapatu	čoráv	to steal/swipe
ufalitu	ihes egin		to flee
xordo keautu	lapurtu, ebatsi		to steal (lit. "make theft")
zuautu	lo egin	sováv	to sleep

Most Erromintxela verbal inflections are virtually identical to those found in Basque dialects:

Erromintxela	Basque (Lapurdian)	Translation
ajinen duk	izanen duk	you will have
dekhatu nuen	ikusi nuen	I saw it
dinat	diñat	I am (familiar female addressee)
erantzi nauzkon	erantzi nauzkan	I had taken them off
...haizen hi	...haizen hi	...that you are
kamatu nuen	maitatu nuen	I loved it
letu hindudan	hartu hintudan	You (familiar) took me
nintzan	nintzan	I was
pekhautzen nina	erretzen naute	They are burning me
pekhautu nintzan	erre nintzen	I (intransitive) burnt
pekhautzen niagon	erretzen niagon	I (intransitive) was burning (female addressee)
tetxalitzen zan	ibiltzen zan	I was going
zethorren	zetorren	It came
zoaz	zoaz	You go!

Negations are formed with na/nagi (Romani na/níči); cf Basque ez/ezetz. The word for "yes" is ua (Romani va); cf Basque bai/baietz.

=== Nouns ===
The majority of nouns have Romani roots, but frequently attested with Basque suffixes. The variation of nouns cited with or without a final -a is likely due to informants supplying them with or without the absolutive ending. (Forms given in angle brackets indicate spellings in the sources which are no longer in use.)

Erromintxela	Basque	Romani	English translation
angi	ezti	(avdžin)	honey
ankhai	begi	(jakh)	eye
anput̄a	buru		head
asinia	botila	(fláša)	bottle
balitxo, balitxua	txerriki	baló "pig" plus a Basque suffix	pork
barki	ardi	bakró	ewe, sheep
barkitxu, barkotiñu, barkixu ⟨barkicho⟩, barrketxua ⟨baŕketxua⟩	arkume	bakró "sheep", plus Basque diminutive -txu, tiñu	lamb; J.M. de O. glosses it as "sheep"
barku	ardi	bakró	sheep
basta, baste	esku	vas(t)	hand, arm
bato, batu	aita	dad	father
bedeio (bedeyo)	erle	(daraši)	bee
bliku	txerri	from balikanó mas "pork"	pig
bluiak, brruttak ⟨bŕut̄ak⟩	poliziak	(policájcur)	policemen
budar, budara, buldara	ate	vudár	door
burrinkatzea	harrapatze		act of catching
butxa	arropa		clothing
dantzari	dantzari	(Basque root)	dancer
dibezi	egun	djes	day
duta	argi	udút	(natural) light
egaxi		gaží	a non-Romani woman
egaxo, ogaxo, egaxu		gažó	a gadjo, anyone not Romani
elakri, ellakria	neska(til)	raklí	girl
elakri-lumia			woman of ill repute
eramaite	erama(i)te		bringing
eratsa, erhatsa, erhatza, erratsa ⟨erratça⟩	ahate	(goca)	duck
erromi (eŕomi), errumi, errumia	senar	rom	1 husband 2 wedding
erromiti, errumitia	emazte	romní	wife
erromni	emazte, emakume	romní	woman, wife
erromitzea	eskontza	(bjáv)	wedding
erromitzeko ⟨eŕomitzeko⟩, erromitzekoa	eraztun	(angruští)	(the) ring (lit. "the one of marrying")
fula	kaka	khul	excrement
futralo			eau-de-vie
gata	ator	gad	shirt
gazin	haur		child
giltizinia	giltza	(čája)	key
goani	zaldi	(grast)	horse
goia	lukainka	goj	sausage
goli	kanta	gilí	song
grasnia, gasnia, grasmiña ⟨gŕasmiña⟩, gra	zaldi	gras(t)	horse
guru, gurru ⟨guŕu⟩, grumiña ⟨gŕumiña⟩	idi	gurúv	ox
guruni	behi	gurumni	cow
gurutiño	txahal	gurúv plus a Basque diminutive -tiño	calf (animal)
haize	haize	(Basque root)	wind
jak, jaka, zaka, aka	su	jag	fire
jakes	gazta	(királ)	cheese
jelua	soka		rope
jera, kera ⟨kéra⟩	asto	(esa)	donkey
jero	buru	šeró	head
jeroko	buruko		beret (lit. "of the head")
juiben, juibena	galtzak	(kálca)	trousers
kalabera	buru	(šeró)	head. Compare Spanish calavera, "Skull"
kalleria ⟨kaĺeria⟩			silverware. Compare Spanish quincallería, "hardware"
kalo, kalu, kalua	kafe	(káfa)	coffee. Compare Caló calé ("black") and Kali, the dark blue goddess.
kalo-kasta	ijito-kastaro		Romani borough. Compare Caló calé ("Spanish Romani").
kamatze	maitatze	< kamáv	loving
kangei ⟨kangey⟩;, kangiria	eliza	kangerí	church; Baudrimont glosses this "altar"
kani, kania, kañiña	oilo	khajní	hen, chicken
kaxta, kasta (casta), kaixta ⟨kaïshta⟩	zur	kašt	wood, stick
kaxtain parruntzeko ⟨paŕuntzeko⟩	aizkora		axe
kher, khe, kere, khere, kerea, kera	etxe	kher	house
kereko-egaxia ⟨kereko-egas̃ia⟩	etxeko andre		lady of the house
kereko-egaxoa ⟨kereko-egas̃oa⟩, kereko-ogaxoa	etxeko jauna		master of the house
ker-barna	gaztelu	(koštola)	castle
ker, ⟨qer⟩, kera	asto	(esa)	donkey
kero, keru, kerua	buru	šeró	head. See before jero.
khertsima	taberna	Compare Old Slavonic кърчьма, кръчьма	tavern
kiala, kilako	gazta	királ	cheese
kilalo			cold air
kirkila	babarruna	(fusúj)	bean
konitza, koanits, koanitsa	saski	kóžnica	basket
laia	jauna		mister, sir
lajai, olajai, lakaia, orajaia	apaiz	(rašáj)	priest
laphail, lakhaia	apaiz	(rašáj)	priest
latzi, latzia	gau		night
lona	gatz	lon	salt
mahutzea, mautzia	hiltze	mu(da)ráv (v.), plus the Basque nominalizing suffixex -tze-a	killing (see mahutu v.)
malabana	gantzu	(thuló mas)	lard
mandro, mandroa, manrua ⟨manŕua⟩	ogi	manró	bread
mangatzia	eske	mangáv (v.), plus the Basque nominalizing suffixes -tze-a	act of begging
marrun (maŕun)	senar		husband
mas, maz, maza, masa, ⟨māsa⟩	haragi	mas	meat
megazin, megazina	haur		child (see before gazin)
milleka ⟨miĺeka⟩	arto		corn (maize)
milota	ogi	(manró)	bread
milotare-pekautzeko	labe		oven
Mimakaro	Ama Birjina, Andra Mari		the Blessed Virgin
miruni	emakume		woman
mitxai, ⟨mits̃ai⟩	alaba	čhaj	daughter
mol, mola	ardo	mol	wine
mullon ⟨muĺon⟩, mullu ⟨muĺu⟩	mando		mule
ñandro, gnandro	arraultz	anró	egg
oxtaben, oxtaban ⟨os̃taban⟩, oxtabena	gartzela	astaripe	prison
paba, phabana, pabana	sagar	phabáj	apple
paba-mola	sagardo		cider (lit. apple-wine)
panin, panina, pañia	ur	pají	water
panineko, paninekoa	pitxer; euritakoa		(the) jug (lit. one for water), J.M. de O. glosses it as euritakoa "umbrella", literally "one for rain"
paninekoain burrinkatzeko ⟨buŕinkatzeko⟩			net(?) ("for catching [...] of the water", Lhande gives French filet)
paninbaru, panin barua	ibai, itsaso	(derjáv, márja)	river, ocean (lit. "big water")
panintino, panin tiñua, penintino	erreka	(len)	small stream (lit. "small water")
pangua	larre		meadow
panizua	arto		corn (maize). Compare Spanish "panizo"
papin, papina	antzar	papin	goose
papira	paper	papíri	paper
pindru, pindrua, pindro, prindo	hanka, oin	punró	foot
pindrotakoa	galtzak	kálca	trousers ("the one for the foot")
piri, piria	lapiko	pirí	saucepan
pora	urdaila	per	stomach
potozi	diruzorro		wallet
prindotako	galtzerdi	pinró (trousers)	sock (lit. "the one for the foot"). See also pindrotakoa
puxka (pushka)	arma	puška. Compare Slavic pušĭka	gun, weapon
soka	gaineko		overcoat
sumia	zupa	zumí	soup
thazautzia	itotze	taslaráv (v.), plus the Basque nominalizing suffixes -tze-a	act of throttling
tejala	jana(ria)		food
tekadi, tekari	hatz	(naj)	finger
ternu	gazte		young person
tiñua		the Basque diminutive tiñu; see also under barkitxu above)	J.M. de O. glosses it as "lamb" and "chick"
txai ⟨ts̃ai⟩		čhaj	young person of either gender.
txaja	aza	(šax)	cabbage
txara	belar	čar	grass
txaripen, txaribel	ohe	(vodro)	bed
txau, xau	seme	čhavó	son. Compare English chav.
txipa	izen	(aláv)	name
txiautu	ijito		a Romani person
txiautzia		?, plus the Basque nominalizing suffixes -tze-a	act of ramming in
txohi, txoki	gona		skirt
txohipen, txohipena		čoripé	petty theft
txor, txora ⟨ts̃ora⟩	lapur	čor	thief
txuri, txuria	aizto	čhurí	knife
xordo, txorda ⟨ts̃orda⟩	lapurketa	čoripé	theft
xukel ⟨s̃ukel⟩, txukel, txukela ⟨ts̃ukela⟩, xukela (shȣkéla)	txakur	žukél	dog; J.M. de O. glosses this as "magistrate" and "dog"
xukelen-fula ⟨s̃ukelen-fula⟩, txukelen fula	txakurren kaka		dogshit
xukel-tino keautzale			female dog (lit. "little dog maker")
zuautzeko, zuautzekoa	estalki		(the) bedcovers
zitzaia, zitzai, txitxai ⟨ts̃its̃ai⟩, txitxaia, sitzaia (sitçaia), txitxaia	katu	čičaj	cat
zume, sume	zupa	zumí	soup
zungulu, sungulu, sungulua	tabako	(duháno)	tobacco
zut, zuta, xut, txuta, txuta ⟨ts̃uta⟩	esne	thud	milk

=== Time ===
According to Baudrimot, the Erromintxela have adopted the Basque names of the months. Note that some of the Basque names represent pre-standardisation names of the months, e.g. August is Abuztua in Standard Basque rather than Agorrila.

Erromintxela	Basque	Romani	Erromintxela translation
Otarila	Urtarrila	(januáro)	January
Otxaila (Otshaïla)	Otsaila	(februáro)	February
Martxoa (Martshoa)	Martxoa	(márto)	March
Apirilia	Apirila	(aprílo)	April
Maitza (Maïtça)	Maiatza	(májo)	May
Hekaña (Hékaña)	Ekaina	(júni)	June
Uztailla (Uçtaïlla)	Uztaila	(júli)	July
Agorilla	Agorrila	(avgústo)	August
Burula	Buruila	(septémbro)	September
Uria	Urria	(októmbro)	October
Azalua (Açalȣa)	Azaroa	(novémbro)	November
Abendua (Abendȣa)	Abendua	(decémbro)	December

Baudrimont claims that subdivisions of the year (apart from the months) are formed with the word breja (bréχa) "year": breja kinua "month" and breja kipia "week".

=== Numerals ===
Numerals (Basque included for contrasting purposes):

Erromintxela	Basque	Romani	Erromintxela translation
jek, jeka, eka, jek (yek), jet (yet)	bat	jék	one
dui, duil	bi	dúj	two
trin, trin, tril	hiru	trín	three
higa	higa (variant form)	(trín)	three
estard	lau	štar	four
pantxe, pains, olepanxi (olepanchi)	bost	panž	five

=== Adjectives and adverbs ===
Adjectives and adverbs are also mostly derived from Romani forms:

Erromintxela	Basque	Romani	Erromintxela translation
baro, baru	handi	baró	large, big
bokali	gose	bokh	hungry
buter	asko, ainitz	but	much, a lot
dibilo		dilino	crazy
dibilotua	erotua	< dilino (adj.)	gone crazy
gabe	gabe	(Basque root)	without
eta	eta	(Basque root)	and
fukar	ederra	šukar	beautiful
geroz	geroz	(Basque root)	once
hautsi	hautsi	(Basque root)	broken
kalu	beltz	kaló	black. Compare "Caló" and Kali, the dark blue goddess.
kaxkani	zikoitz		stingy
kilalo	hotz	šilaló	cold
latxo, latxu	on	lačhó	good
londo	samur		soft
nazaro, lazaro	eri	nasvaló	sick
palian	ondoan		nearby
parno	garbi	parnó (white)	clean
telian	behean	téla	under
tiñu, tiñua	txiki	cignó	small
upre	gain(ean), gora	opré	on top, up

=== Pronouns and demonstratives ===
Pronouns are derived from both languages:

Erromintxela	Basque	Romani	Erromintxela translation
aimenge	ni	mánge "me", possibly aménge "us" (dative forms)	I
ene	ene	(Basque root)	my (affectionate)
harekin	harekin	(Basque root)	with it (distal)
hari	hari	(Basque root)	to you (familiar)
hartan	hartan	(Basque root)	in it (distal)
heure	heure	(Basque root)	your (familiar emphatic)
hi	hi	(Basque root)	you (familiar)
hire	hire	(Basque root)	your (familiar)
hiretzat	hiretzat	(Basque root)	for you (familiar)
mindroa	nirea	miró	my
neure	neure	(Basque root)	my (emphatic)
ni	ni	(Basque root)	I (intransitive)

== Baudrimont's material ==
Much of Baudrimont's wordlist is easily related to other Erromintxela sources. However, some of the material collected by Baudrimont deserves a more detailed overview due to its peculiarities. Most of these relate to the verbs and verb forms he collected but some include nouns and other items.

=== Nouns ===
His material contains a relatively high number of Basque-derived items.

Erromintxela	Basque	Romani	Erromintxela translation
aitza (aitça)	aritz		oak
aizia (aicia)	haize	(diha)	air
egala	hegal	(phak)	wing
itxasoa (itshasoa)	itsaso	(derjáv)	sea
keia (kéïa)	ke	(thuv)	smoke
muxkera (mȣshkera)	musker	(gusturica)	lizard
orratza (orratça)	orratz	(suv)	needle
sudura (sȣdȣra)	sudur	(nakh)	nose
ulia (ȣlia)	euli	(mačhin)	fly (insect)
xuria (shȣria)	(t)xori	(čiriklí)	bird

Certain items are peculiar. Baudrimont lists mintxa as "tooth". The Kalderash term is dand (daní in Caló) but the term given is immediately more reminiscent of Northern Basque mintzo "speech" or mintza "skin" (with expressive palatalization). This, and other similar items, raise the question of whether Baudrimont was simply pointing at items to elicit forms.

The forms he attempted to elicit are questionable in some cases as well. For example, he attempted to agricultural terms such as plough, harrow and aftermath from his (female) informants and records the suspiciously similar sasta "plough" and xatxa (shatsha) "harrow".

=== Verb system and pronouns ===
The verb systems and pronouns recorded by Baudrimont is peculiar in several ways. Apart from his problem of eliciting the citation form of verbs as opposed to participles, he lists pronouns and possessive pronouns that appear to contain Romani roots and an unexpected auxiliary.

The verb ajin for "to have" attested elsewhere although Basque derived forms appear more common overall. Kalderash Romani employs the 3rd person of "to be" and a dative pronoun to express ownership:

Erromintxela	Basque (allocutive forms)	Romani	Erromintxela translation
mek ajin (mec aχin) tuk ajin (tȣc aχin) ojuak ajin (oχuac aχin) buter ajin (bȣter aχin) tuk ajin (tȣc aχin) but ajin (bȣt aχin)	(nik) di(n)at (hik) duk^{1}/dun (hark) dik/din (guk) di(n)agu (zuek) duzue (haiek) ditek/diten	si ma si tu si les/la si amé si tumé si len	I have you have he/she has we have you have they have
mek najin (mec naχin) tuk najin (tȣc naχin) ojuak najin (oχuac naχin) buter najin (bȣter naχin) tuk najin (tȣc naχin) but najin (bȣt naχin)	(nik) ez di(n)at (hik) ez duk/dun (hark) ez dik/din (guk) ez di(n)agu (zuek) ez duzue (haiek) ez ditek/diten	naj/nané ma naj/nané tu naj/nané les/la naj/nané amé naj/nané tumé naj/nané len	I don't have you don't have he/she doesn't have we don't have you don't have they don't have
mek naxano (mec nashano) tuk naxano (tȣc nashano) ojuak naxano (oχuac nashano) buter naxano (bȣter nashano) tuk naxano (tȣc nashano) but naxano (bȣt nashano)	(nik) izanen di(n)at (hik) izanen duk/dun (hark) izanen dik/din (guk) izanen di(n)agu (zuek) izanen duzue (haiek) izanen ditek/diten	ka si ma ka si tu ka si les/la ka si amé ka si tumé ka si len	I will have you will have he/she will have we will have you will have they will have

^{1}Note that forms like duk (3rd pers-have-2nd per (male)) are the verbal part whereas Erromintxela tuk is a pronoun.

The negative particle na is fairly clear in the forms above. Buter, as Baudrimont notes, is the word for "much, many" and may not be a true pronoun. Kalderash uses the accusative pronouns to express possession but the forms above are more reminiscent of wrongly parsed Kalderash dative forms mangé, tuké, léske, léke etc. and perhaps a different case of "to be" (the full Kalderash paradigm being sim, san, si, si, sam, san/sen, si).

On the whole, it raises questions about the level of communication between Baudrimont and his informants and the quality of (some of the) material elicited.

== Connected examples ==
Examples with interlinear versions (lexical items of Romani origin marked in bold):

khere-ko ogaxo-a
house-ATTR master-ABS
"the master of the house"

hire-tzat goli kerau-tze-n d-i-na-t
your(informal)-BEN song make-NMZ-LOC ABS.3SG-PRE DAT-FEM.ALLOC-ERG.1SG
"I sing for you."

xau-a, goli keau za-k, mol buterr-ago aji-n-en d-u-k
boy-ABS sing make have-ERG.FAM.MASC wine much-COMP have-PFV-FUT ABS.3SG-have-ERG.MASC.ALLOC
"Boy, sing, you will have more wine!"

txipa nola d-u-zu?
name how ABS.3SG-have-ERG.2SG
"What is your name?"

masa-k eta barki-txu-ak pangu-an d-a-o-z
meat-ABS.PL and sheep-DIM-ABS.PL meadow-LOC ABS.3SG-PRES-go-PL
"The sheep and lambs are on the meadow."

nire kera zure-a-ren pali-an d-a-o, hemen-dik obeto-ao dika-tu-ko d-u-zu
my house your-ABS-GEN proximity-LOC ABS.3SG-PRES-locate here-ABL better-COMP see-PFV-FUT ABS.3SG-have-ERG.2SG
"My house is next to yours, you can see it better from here."

== Bibliography ==
- Baudrimont, A. (1862) Vocabulaire de la langue des Bohémiens habitant les Pays Basque Français Academie Impérial des Sciences, Bordeaux
- Berraondo, R. (1921) La euskera de los gitanos in Euskalerriaren Alde - Revista de Cultura Vasca
- Macritchie, D. (1886) Accounts Of The Gypsies Of India New Society Publications, New Delhi; 2007 Reprint ISBN 978-1-4067-5005-8
- Michel, F. (1857) Le Pays Basque Paris
