= Kalé Dor Kayiko =

Romani cultural organization

Kalé Dor Kayiko is a Romani cultural organisation in the Basque Autonomous Community. It was founded in 1989 and has centres in Bilbao, Irun, Portugalete and Erandio.

It promotes both languages of the Romani resident in the Basque Country, Erromintxela and Caló.
