= Alexandre Baudrimont =

Alexandre Edouard Baudrimont
- Born: 7 May 1806; Compiègne, France
- Died: 24 January 1880 (aged 73)
- Known for: Preparation of sodium phosphide, description of Erromintxela
- Scientific career
- Fields: Chemistry, linguistics, ethnography
- Thesis: Recherches sur les phénomènes chimiques de l'évolution embryonnaire des oiseaux et des batraciens (1847)

Alexandre Edouard Baudrimont (7 May 1806 – 24 January 1880) was a 19th-century French professor of chemistry who published various books connected to the sciences, languages and the Basque Country (in particular Erromintxela):

- Dictionnaire de l'industrie manufacturière, commerciale et agricole (1837, Paris)
- Recherches anatomiques et physiologiques sur le développement du fœtus: et en particulier sur l'évolution embryonnaire des oiseaux et des batraciens (with Martin Saint-Ange, G.J.) (1846)
- Histoire des Basques ou Escualdunais primitifs, restaurée d'après la langue, les caractères ethnologiques et les mœurs des Basques actuels (1854, Paris)
- Vocabulaire de la langue des Bohémiens habitant les Pays Basque Français (1862, Bordeaux)

In the field of science he is best known for first preparation of Na_{3}P in the mid-19th century by reacting molten sodium with phosphorus pentachloride.
