= Kalderash Romani language =

Vlax Romani dialects of Romania

Kalderash Romani
- Native to: Romania
- Language family: Indo-European: Indo-Iranian; Indo-Aryan; Central Zone; Romani; Vlax; Northern/Vlax I; Kalderash Romani
- Dialects: Erromintxela (Note: Erromintxela's vocabulary is primarily Kalderash Romani in origin, while the syntax and morphology is primarily Basque in origin.)

Language codes
- ISO 639-3: –
- Glottolog: kald1238

Kalderash Romani is a group of Vlax dialects spoken by the Kalderash Romani, mainly in Romania. Its main contact language is Romanian.

The Bible was translated to Kalderash Romani by Matéo Maximoff.
