= Zinc nitride =

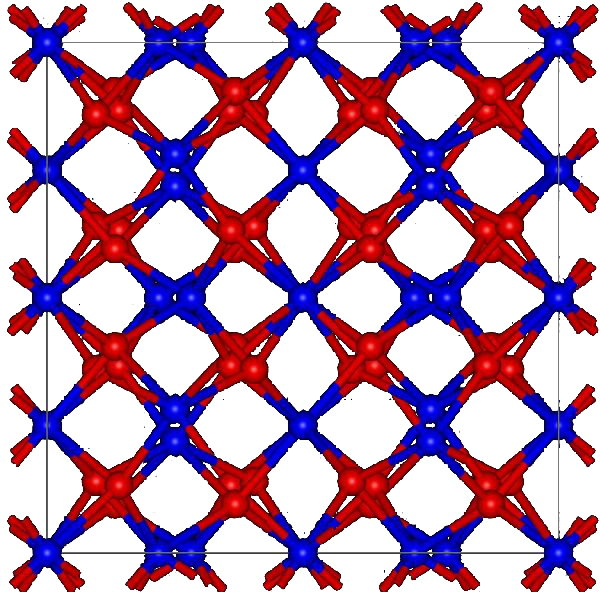

Identifiers
CAS Number	1313-49-1
3D model (JSmol)	Interactive image
ECHA InfoCard	100.013.826
EC Number	215-207-3
PubChem CID	12130759
UNII	7OOJ6UE14L
CompTox Dashboard (EPA)	DTXSID001014317
- InChI: InChI=1S/2N.3Zn/q2*-1;;;+2 Key: AKJVMGQSGCSQBU-UHFFFAOYSA-N
- SMILES: [N-]=[Zn].[N-]=[Zn].[Zn+2]

Properties
Chemical formula	Zn_{3}N_{2}
Molar mass	224.154 g/mol
Appearance	blue-gray cubic crystals
Density	6.22 g/cm^{3}, solid
Melting point	decomposes 700°C
Solubility in water	insoluble, reacts

Structure
Crystal structure	Cubic, cI80
Space group	Ia-3, No. 206

Hazards
- GHS labelling
Pictograms	(GHS07: Exclamation mark)
Signal word	Warning
Hazard statements	H315, H319
Precautionary statements	P264, P280, P302+P352, P305+P351+P338, P321, P332+P313, P337+P313, P362
NFPA 704 (fire diamond)	1 0 2 W
- Except where otherwise noted, data are given for materials in their standard state (at 25 °C [77 °F], 100 kPa). verify (what is ?) Infobox references

Zinc nitride (Zn_{3}N_{2}) is an inorganic compound of zinc and nitrogen, usually obtained as (blue)grey crystals. It is a semiconductor. In pure form, it has the anti-bixbyite structure.

== Chemical properties ==
Zinc nitride can be obtained by thermally decomposing zincamide (zinc diamine) in an anaerobic environment, at temperatures in excess of 200 °C. The by-product of the reaction is ammonia.

3 Zn(NH_{2})_{2} → Zn_{3}N_{2} + 4 NH_{3}

It can also be formed by heating zinc to 600 °C in a current of ammonia; the by-product is hydrogen gas.

3 Zn + 2 NH_{3} → Zn_{3}N_{2} + 3 H_{2}

The decomposition of Zinc Nitride into the elements at the same temperature is a competing reaction. At 700 °C Zinc Nitride decomposes. It has also been made by producing an electric discharge between zinc electrodes in a nitrogen atmosphere. Thin films have been produced by chemical vapour deposition of Bis(bis(trimethylsilyl)amido]zinc with ammonia gas onto silica or ZnO coated alumina at 275 to 410 °C.

The crystal structure is anti-isomorphous with Manganese(III) oxide. (bixbyite). The heat of formation is c. 24 kilocalories (100 kJ) per mol. It is a semiconductor with a reported bandgap of c. 3.2eV, however, a thin zinc nitride film prepared by electrolysis of molten salt mixture containing Li_{3}N with a zinc electrode showed a band-gap of 1.01 eV.

Zinc nitride reacts violently with water to form ammonia and zinc oxide.

Zn_{3}N_{2} + 3 H_{2}O → 3 ZnO + 2 NH_{3}

Zinc nitride reacts with lithium (produced in an electrochemical cell) by insertion. The initial reaction is the irreversible conversion into LiZn in a matrix of beta-Li_{3}N. These products then can be converted reversibly and electrochemically into LiZnN and metallic Zn.

== See also ==
- Nitride
- Zinc nitrate
