= Tris(trimethylsilyl)phosphine =

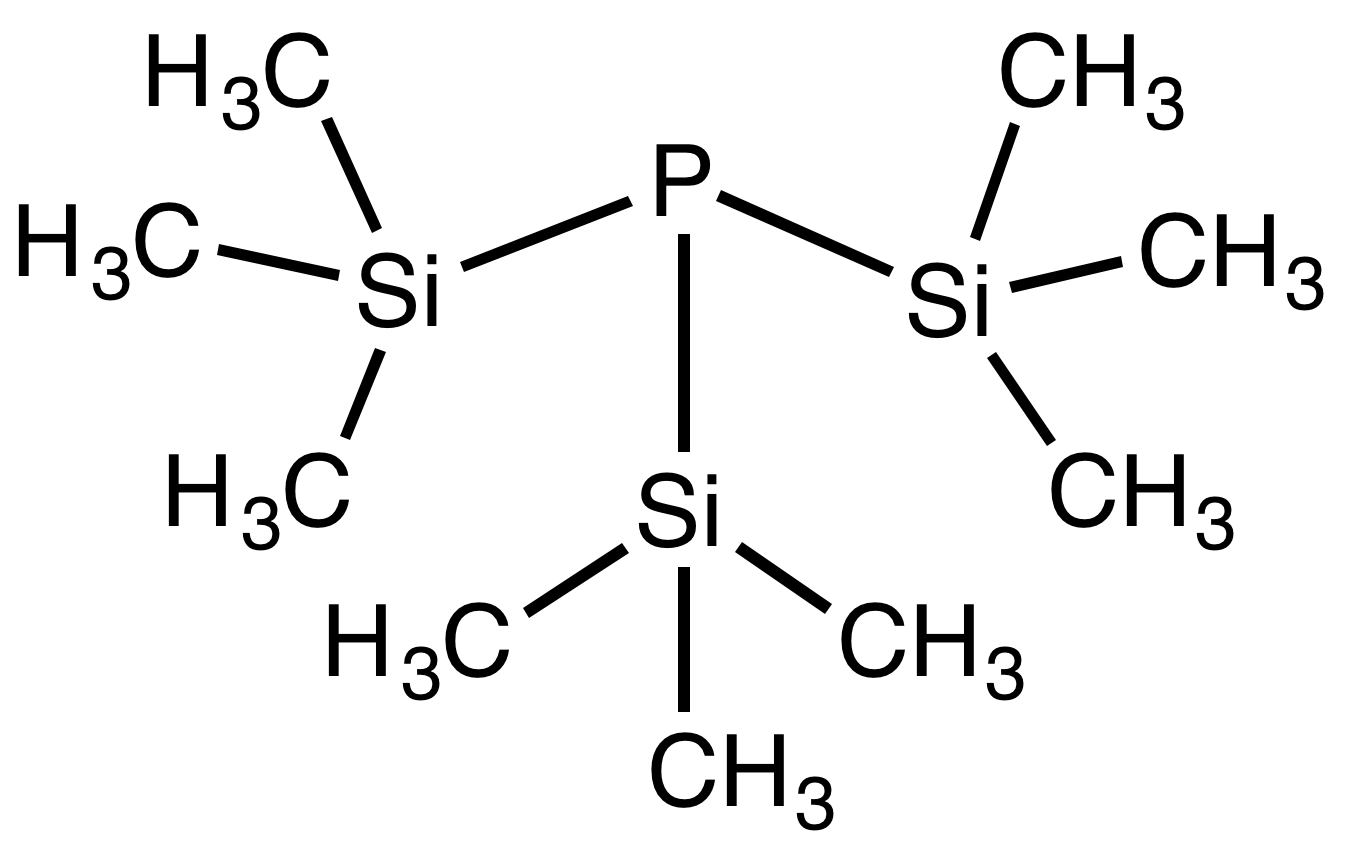

Names
- Preferred IUPAC name Tris(trimethylsilyl)phosphane

Identifiers
CAS Number	15573-38-3
3D model (JSmol)	Interactive image
ChemSpider	239909
ECHA InfoCard	100.154.516
EC Number	626-081-8
PubChem CID	272683
CompTox Dashboard (EPA)	DTXSID70297687
- InChI: InChI=1S/C9H27PSi3/c1-11(2,3)10(12(4,5)6)13(7,8)9/h1-9H3 Key: OUMZKMRZMVDEOF-UHFFFAOYSA-N
- SMILES: C[Si](C)(C)P([Si](C)(C)C)[Si](C)(C)C

Properties
Chemical formula	C_{9}H_{27}PSi_{3}
Molar mass	250.544 g·mol^{−1}
Appearance	colorless liquid
Density	0.863 g/cm^{3}
Melting point	24 °C (75 °F; 297 K)
Boiling point	243–244 °C (469–471 °F; 516–517 K)

Hazards
- Occupational safety and health (OHS/OSH)
Main hazards	poison, inflammable
- GHS labelling
Pictograms	(GHS05: Corrosive) (GHS07: Exclamation mark)
Signal word	Danger
Hazard statements	H250, H252, H315, H319, H335
Precautionary statements	P210, P222, P235+P410, P261, P264, P271, P280, P302+P334, P302+P352, P304+P340, P305+P351+P338, P312, P321, P332+P313, P337+P313, P362, P370+P378, P403+P233, P405, P407, P413, P420, P422, P501
- Except where otherwise noted, data are given for materials in their standard state (at 25 °C [77 °F], 100 kPa). Infobox references

Tris(trimethylsilyl)phosphine is the organophosphorus compound with the formula P(SiMe_{3})_{3} (Me = methyl). It is a colorless liquid that ignites in air and hydrolyses readily.

== Synthesis ==
Tris(trimethylsilyl)phosphine is prepared by treating trimethylsilyl chloride, white phosphorus, and sodium-potassium alloy:

1/4 P_{4} + 3 Me_{3}SiCl + 3 K → P(SiMe_{3})_{3} + 3 KCl

Several other methods exist.

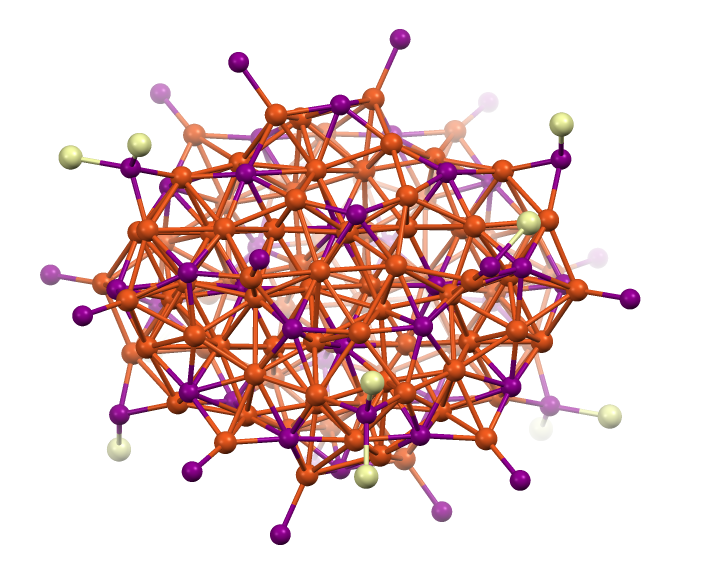
Copper phosphide cluster Cu_{96}P_{30}{P(SiMe_{3})_{2}}_{6}(PEt_{3})_{18} with C and H atoms omitted for clarity (red=Cu, purple=P, tan=Si). Tris(trimethylsilyl)phosphine the reagent used to install the phosphide ligands.

== Reactions ==
The compound hydrolyzes to give phosphine:

P(SiMe_{3})_{3} + 3 H_{2}O → PH_{3} + 3 HOSiMe_{3}

Treatment of certain acyl chlorides with tris(trimethylsilyl)phosphine gives phosphaalkynes, one example being tert-butylphosphaacetylene.

Synthesis of a phosphaalkyne using tris(trimethylsilyl)phosphine.

Reaction with potassium tert-butoxide cleaves one P-Si bond, giving the phosphide salt:

P(SiMe_{3})_{3} + KO-t-Bu → KP(SiMe_{3})_{2} + Me_{3}SiO-t-Bu

It is a reagent in the preparation of metal phosphido clusters by reaction with metal halides or carboxylates. In such reactions the silyl halide or silyl carboxylate is liberated as illustrated in this idealized reaction:

P(SiMe_{3})_{3} + 3 CuCl → Cu_{3}P + 3 ClSiMe_{3}

== Safety ==
Tris(trimethylsilyl)phosphine spontaneously ignites in air, thus it is handled using air-free techniques.
