= Magnesium nitride =

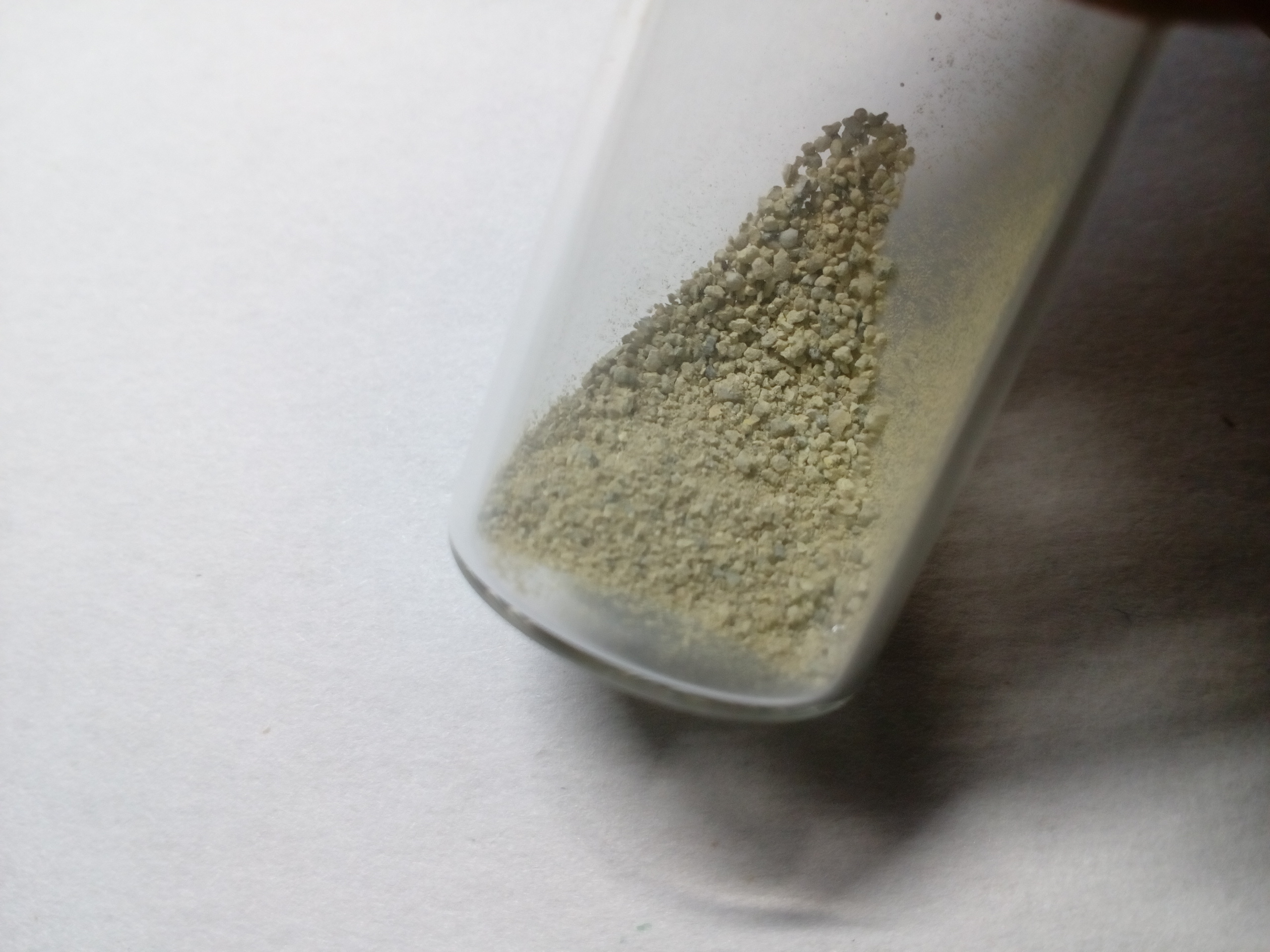
- Magnesium nitride

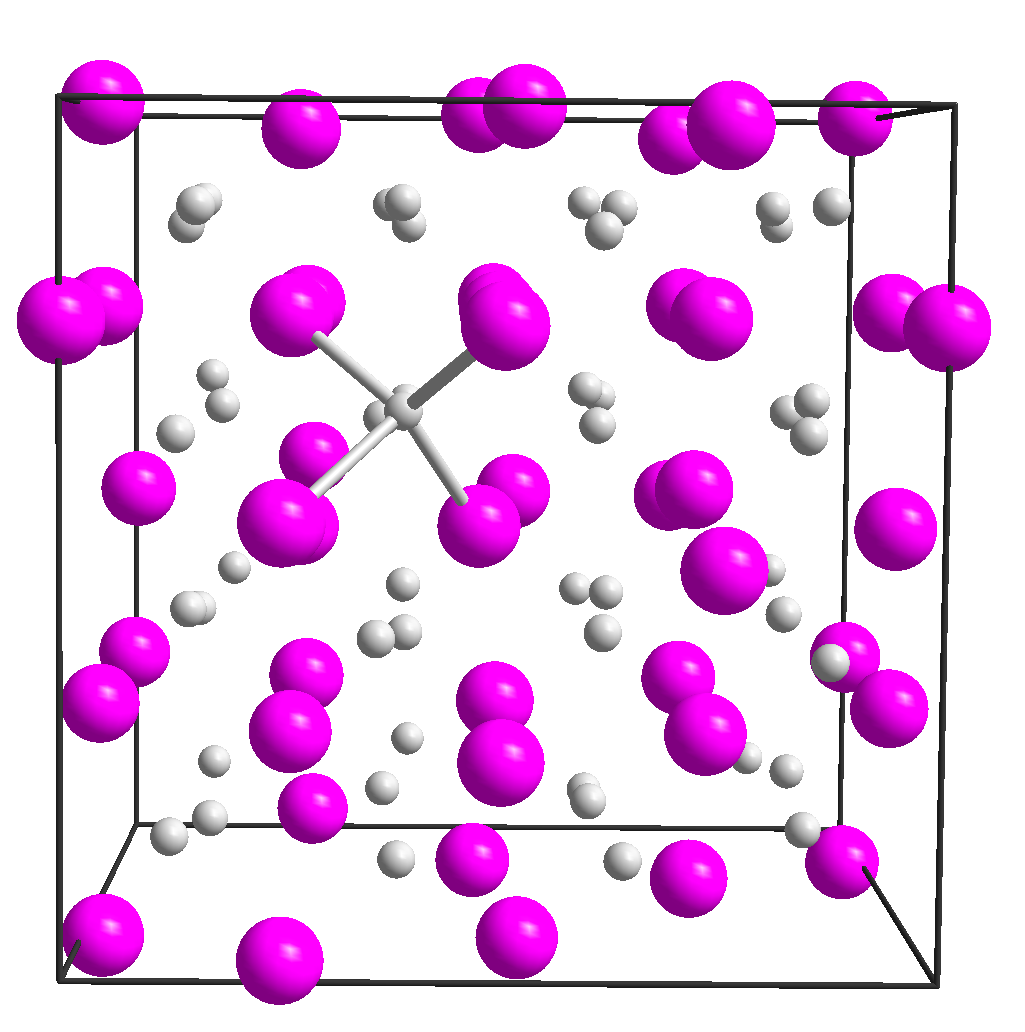
- structure of magnesium nitride

Names
- IUPAC name Magnesium nitride
- Other names trimagnesium dinitride

Identifiers
CAS Number	12057-71-5
3D model (JSmol)	Interactive image
ChemSpider	10605770
ECHA InfoCard	100.031.826
EC Number	235-022-1
PubChem CID	3673438
UNII	7941Y31SR6
UN number	3178
CompTox Dashboard (EPA)	DTXSID701014275
- InChI: InChI=1S/3Mg.N2/c;;;1-2/q;2*+1;-2 Key: VZPQZBKNAUHPOS-UHFFFAOYSA-N
- SMILES: [Mg]1[Mg]N=N[Mg]1

Properties
Chemical formula	Mg_{3}N_{2}
Molar mass	100.929 g·mol^{−1}
Appearance	yellow cubic crystals or green powder
Density	2.71 g/cm^{3}
Melting point	≈ 1,500 °C (2,730 °F; 1,770 K) (listed as 800 °C (1,470 °F) with decomposition by Fisher's SDS)
Band gap	1.510 eV

Structure
Crystal structure	Cubic
Space group	Ia3̅ [206]
Point group	m3̅
Lattice constant	a = 8.681 Å, b = 8.681 Å, c = 8.681 Å α = 109.471°, β = 109.471°, γ = 109.471°
Lattice volume (V)	503.682 Å^{3}
Formula units (Z)	8
Coordination geometry	tetrahedral at Mg^{2+}; octahedral at N^{3−}

Hazards
- GHS labelling
Pictograms	(GHS02: Flammable) (GHS07: Exclamation mark)
Signal word	Danger
Hazard statements	H260, H315, H319, H335
Precautionary statements	P223, P231+P232, P261, P264, P271, P280, P302+P352, P304+P340+P312, P305+P351+P338, P332+P313, P335+P334, P337+P313, P362, P370+P378, P402+P404, P403+P233, P405, P501
NFPA 704 (fire diamond)	2 2 0 W

Related compounds
Other cations	Beryllium nitride; Calcium nitride; Aluminium nitride
- Except where otherwise noted, data are given for materials in their standard state (at 25 °C [77 °F], 100 kPa). verify (what is ?) Infobox references

Magnesium nitride, which possesses the chemical formula Mg_{3}N_{2}, is an inorganic compound of magnesium and nitrogen. At room temperature and pressure it is a greenish yellow powder.

== History ==
When measuring the boiling point of magnesium, Henri Étienne Sainte-Claire Deville and Henri Caron identified that molten magnesium they distilled covered itself by "small colorless and transparent needles which are destroyed fairly quickly by transforming into ammonia and magnesia". In their 1857 publication the chemists interpreted it as a likely nitride similar to those discovered by Friedrich Wöhler and Heinrich Rose.

It was indeed confirmed in 1862 when Friedrich Briegleb and Johann Georg Anton Geuther synthesized the compound on purpose and first studied it.

== Preparation ==
Magnesium nitride may be prepared by passing dry, very pure nitrogen over heated magnesium at 800–850 °C (1,470–1,560 °F) for 90 minutes:

3 Mg + N_{2} → Mg_{3}N_{2}

Or by passing dry ammonia over heated magnesium at 800–850 °C (1,470–1,560 °F) for 4 hours:

3 Mg + 2 NH_{3} → Mg_{3}N_{2} + 3 H_{2}

This second method is preferred despite the additional time required due to the difficulty of fully purifying nitrogen gas to prevent the formation of unwanted oxides.

== Chemistry ==
Magnesium nitride reacts with water to produce magnesium hydroxide and ammonia gas, as do many metal nitrides.

Mg_{3}N_{2}(s) + 6 H_{2}O(l) → 3 Mg(OH)_{2}(aq) + 2 NH_{3}(g)

In fact, when magnesium is burned in air, some magnesium nitride is formed in addition to the principal product, magnesium oxide.

Thermal decomposition of magnesium nitride at 700–1,500 °C (1,292–2,732 °F) gives magnesium and nitrogen gas.

At high pressures, the stability and formation of new nitrogen-rich nitrides (N/Mg ratio equal or greater to one) were suggested and later discovered. These include the Mg_{2}N_{4} and MgN_{4} solids which both become thermodynamically stable near 50 GPa (7.3 million psi). The Mg_{2}N_{4} is composed of exotic cis-tetranitrogen N^{4−}_{4} species with N-N bond orders close to one. This Mg_{2}N_{4} compound was recovered to ambient conditions, along with the N^{4−}_{4} units, marking only the fourth polynitrogen entity bulk stabilized at ambient conditions.

== Uses and history ==
When isolating argon, William Ramsay passed dry air over copper to remove oxygen and over magnesium to remove the nitrogen, forming magnesium nitride.

Magnesium nitride was the catalyst in the first practical synthesis of borazon (cubic boron nitride).

Robert H. Wentorf, Jr. was trying to convert the hexagonal form of boron nitride into the cubic form by a combination of heat, pressure, and a catalyst. He had already tried all the logical catalysts (for instance, those that catalyze the synthesis of diamond), but with no success.

Out of desperation and curiosity (he called it the "make the maximum number of mistakes" approach), he added some magnesium wire to the hexagonal boron nitride and gave it the same pressure and heat treatment. When he examined the wire under a microscope, he found tiny dark lumps clinging to it. These lumps could scratch a polished block of boron carbide, something only diamond was known to do.

From the smell of ammonia, caused by the reaction of magnesium nitride with the moisture in the air, he deduced that the magnesium metal had reacted with the boron nitride to form magnesium nitride, which was the true catalyst.

Magnesium nitride has also been applied to synthesize aluminum nitride nanocrystals, cubic boron nitride and nitrides of aluminum and group 3 elements. It has also been proposed as an intermediate in a fossil-fuel-free nitrogen fixation process.
