= Pernitride =

Names
- IUPAC names: dinitride(4−); diazanetetraide
- Other names: hydrazido(4-); hydrazinetetraide

Identifiers
3D model (JSmol)	Interactive image
ChEBI	CHEBI:29278
ChemSpider	21864932
- InChI: InChI=1S/N2/c1-2/q-4 Key: UXMOGIXOTMNDOH-UHFFFAOYSA-N
- SMILES: [N-2][N-2]

Properties
Chemical formula	N_{2}^{4−}
Molar mass	28.016 g·mol^{−1}
- Except where otherwise noted, data are given for materials in their standard state (at 25 °C [77 °F], 100 kPa). Infobox references

In chemistry, pernitrides are compounds containing the pernitride group, N^{2−}−N^{2−}. Pernitride is isoelectronic to peroxide (O^{−}−O^{−}), from which the name is derived.

== Transition metal pernitrides ==
Pernitrides MN_{2} for each of the platinum group elements in their +4 oxidation state (M = Pt, Ir, Os, Pd, Rh, Ru) have been obtained via direct combination of the elements at high temperature and pressure using a laser heated diamond anvil cell. Titanium(IV) pernitride TiN_{2} can likewise be obtained by combining titanium(III) nitride (TiN) with molecular nitrogen. All these pernitrides are recoverable (kinetically persistent) at ambient temperature and pressure with the exception of PdN_{2}, which was inferred to decompose below 13 GPa.

== Pernitride complexes ==
Pernitrides are related to hydrazine and inorganic hydrazides, from which they may be formally derived via deprotonation. A gallium pernitride complex [(GaMe)_{4}(GaMe_{2})_{4}(N_{2})(NH−NMe)_{4}] has been synthesized via thermolysis of the corresponding hydrazide [(GaMe_{2})_{4}(NH−NMe)(NH−NHMe)_{2}].

== See also ==
- Polynitrides
