= Phosphide =

Compound containing the P3– ion or its equivalent

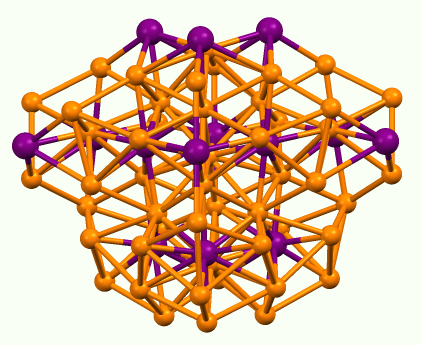
A portion of the structure of Cu_{3}P, highlighting the highly crosslinked nature common to many transition metal phosphides (Cu = orange, P = purple).

In chemistry, a phosphide is a compound containing the P^{3−} ion or its equivalent. Many different phosphides are known, with widely differing structures. Most commonly encountered on the binary phosphides, i.e. those materials consisting only of phosphorus and a less electronegative element. Numerous are polyphosphides, which are solids consisting of anionic chains or clusters of phosphorus. Phosphides are known with the majority of less electronegative elements with the exception of Hg, Pb, Sb, Bi, Te, and Po. Finally, some phosphides are molecular.

== Binary phosphides ==
Binary phosphides include phosphorus and one other element. An example of a group 1 phosphide is sodium phosphide (Na_{3}P). Other notable examples include aluminium phosphide (AlP) and calcium phosphide (Ca_{3}P_{2}), which are used as pesticides, exploiting their tendency to release toxic phosphine upon hydrolysis. Magnesium phosphide (Mg_{3}P_{2}) also is moisture sensitive. Indium phosphide (InP) and gallium phosphide (GaP) are used as a semiconductors, often in combination of related arsenides. Copper phosphide (Cu_{3}P) illustrates a rare stoichiometry for a phosphide. These species are insoluble in all solvents – they are 3-dimensional solid state polymers. For those with electropositive metals, the materials hydrolyze:

Ca_{3}P_{2} + 6 H_{2}O → 3 Ca(OH)_{2} + 2 PH_{3}

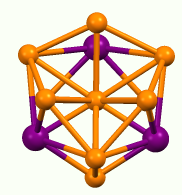
Coordination environment around Cu in Cu_{3}P. Two pairs of Cu atoms are eclipsed.

== Polyphosphides ==
Structure of the P^{3−}_{7} subunit as found in M_{3}P_{7} (M = alkali metal).

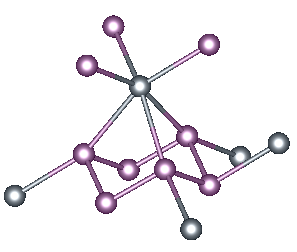
Close up on the structure of SnP_{3}, highlighting the bonding around P (violet) and Sn (gray).

Polyphosphides contain P−P bonds. The simplest polyphosphides would be derivatives of P^{4−}_{2}. The free anions are rarely encountered because they are so basic. Most members follow the octet rule.

Well studied polyphosphides are derivatives of P^{3−}_{7}. This Zintl cluster anion is obtained with diverse alkali metal derivatives.

The nomenclature for polyphosphides can be deceptive. As confirmed by X-ray crystallography tin triphosphide and germanium triphosphide are not triphosphides, but hexaphosphides. They consist of ruffled cyclo-P^{6−}_{6} subunits. Another example of deceptive nomenclature is "thorium pentaphosphide", which consists of a polymeric polyphosphide related to Hittorf's phosphorus.

Several polyphosphides contain the cluster P^{3−}_{11} ions and polymeric chain anions (e.g. the helical (P^{−})_{n} ion) and complex sheet or 3D anions. The range of structures is extensive. Potassium has nine phosphides: K_{3}P, K_{4}P_{3}, K_{5}P_{4}, KP, K_{4}P_{6}, K_{3}P_{7}, K_{3}P_{11}, KP_{10.3}, KP_{15}. Eight mono- and polyphosphides of nickel also exist: (Ni_{3}P, Ni_{5}P_{2}, Ni_{12}P_{5}, Ni_{2}P, Ni_{5}P_{4}, NiP, NiP_{2}, NiP_{3}).

Two polyphosphide ions, P^{4−}_{3} found in K_{4}P_{3} and P^{5−}_{4} found in K_{5}P_{4}, are radical anions with an odd number of valence electrons.

== Preparation of phosphide and polyphosphide materials ==
There are many ways to prepare phosphide compounds. One common way involves heating a metal and red phosphorus (P) under inert atmospheric conditions or vacuum. In principle, all metal phosphides and polyphosphides can be synthesized from elemental phosphorus and the respective metal element in stoichiometric forms. However, the synthesis is complicated due to several problems. The exothermic reactions are often explosive due to local overheating. Oxidized metals, or even just an oxidized layer on the exterior of the metal, causes extreme and unacceptably high temperatures for beginning phosphorination. Hydrothermal reactions to generate nickel phosphides have produced pure and well crystallized nickel phosphide compounds, Ni_{2}P and Ni_{12}P_{5}. These compounds were synthesized through a solid-liquid reaction between NiCl_{2}·12H_{2}O and red phosphorus at 200 °C for 24 and 48 hours, respectively.

Metal phosphides are also produced by reaction of tris(trimethylsilyl)phosphine with metal halides. In this method, the halide is liberated as the volatile trimethylsilyl chloride.

Structure of terminal phosphido complexes of molybdenum.

A method for the preparation of K_{2}P_{16} from red phosphorus and potassium ethoxide has been reported.

== Molecular phosphides ==
Compounds with triple bonds between a metal and phosphorus are rare. The main examples have the formula P≡Mo(NR_{2})_{3}, where R is a bulky organic substituent.

== Organic phosphides ==
Many organophosphides are known. Common examples have the formula R_{2}PM where R is an organic substituent and M is a metal. One example is lithium diphenylphosphide.

== Natural examples ==
The mineral schreibersite (Fe,Ni)_{3}P is common in some meteorites.
