= Carpathian Romani =

Group of dialects of the Romani language

- Central Romani
- Native to: Poland, Czech Republic, Slovakia, Austria, Ukraine, Slovenia
- Native speakers: (150,000 in the Czech Republic, Slovakia, and Ukraine cited 2001 & 2011 censuses)
- Language family: Indo-European: Indo-Iranian; Indo-Aryan; Romani; Carpathian Romani

Language codes
- ISO 639-3: rmc
- Glottolog: carp1235
- ELP: Carpathian Romani

Carpathian Romani, also known as Central Romani, is a group of dialects of the Romani language spoken in the eastern Czech Republic, southern Poland, Slovakia, eastern Austria, eastern Slovenia, northeastern Croatia, Hungary, and northwestern Romania.

Central Romani is one of a dozen major dialect groups within Romani, an Indo-Aryan language of Europe. The Central dialects of Romani are traditionally spoken by some subethnic groups of the Romani people in Hungary, the Czech Republic, Slovakia (with the exception of its southwestern and south-central regions), southeastern Poland, the Transcarpathia province of Ukraine, and parts of Romanian Transylvania. There are also established outmigrant communities of Central Romani speakers in the United States, and recent outmigrant communities in the United Kingdom, Ireland, Belgium, and some other Western European countries.

== Dialects ==
Elšík uses this classification and dialect examples (geographical information from Matras):

Sub-group	Dialect	Modern place
Northern Central	Bohemian	Czech Republic (extinct later after Porajmos)
	West Slovak	Slovakia
	East Slovak	Slovakia, Czech Republic
	South Polish	Poland
Gurvari	Gurvari	Hungary
Southern Central	Romungro	Hungary
	Roman	Austria
	Vend	Hungary, Slovenia

== See also ==
- Languages of Poland
- Languages of Hungary
- Languages of Austria
- Languages of Ukraine

== Bibliography ==
- Boretzky, Norbert. 1999. Die Gliederung der Zentralen Dialekte und die Beziehungen zwischen Südlichen Zentralen Dialekten (Romungro) und Südbalkanischen Romani-Dialekten. In: Halwachs, Dieter W. and Florian Menz (eds.) Die Sprache der Roma. Perspektiven der Romani-Forschung in Österreich im interdisziplinären und internazionalen Kontext. Klagenfurt: Drava. 210–276.
- Elšík, Viktor, Milena Hübschmannová, and Hana Šebková. 1999. The Southern Central (ahi-imperfect) Romani dialects of Slovakia and northern Hungary. In: Halwachs, Dieter W. and Florian Menz (eds.) Die Sprache der Roma. Perspektiven der Romani-Forschung in Österreich im interdisziplinären und internazionalen Kontext. Klagenfurt: Drava. 277–390.
- Elšík, Viktor. 2003. Interdialect contact of Czech (and Slovak) Romani varieties. International Journal of the Sociology of Language, 162, 41–62.
- Elšík, Viktor, and Yaron Matras. 2006. Markedness and language change: The Romani sample. Berlin: Mouton de Gruyter.
- Koptová, Anna. (2011). Slovensko-rómsky, rómsko-slovenský slovník = Slovačiko-romano, romano-slovačiko lavustik = Slovaćiqo-rromano, rromano-slovaćiqo lavustik. Koptová, Martina. (1. vyd ed.). Košice: Nadácia Dobrá Rómska Víla Kesaj. ISBN 978-80-970999-0-9. OCLC 854687874.
