= Lithium arsenide =

Names
- Other names Litium monoarsenide

Identifiers
CAS Number	Li_{3}As: 12044-22-3
3D model (JSmol)	Li_{3}As: Interactive image; LiAs: Interactive image; Li_{3}As_{7}: Interactive image
ChemSpider	Li_{3}As: 74786; LiAs: 9151176
ECHA InfoCard	100.031.761
EC Number	Li_{3}As: 234-950-4
PubChem CID	Li_{3}As: 82878; LiAs: 10975975
CompTox Dashboard (EPA)	Li_{3}As: DTXSID5065221
- InChI: InChI=1S/As.3Li Key: NVMVLBOIYVUMOZ-UHFFFAOYSA-N; LiAs: InChI=1S/As.Li Key: FKQOMXQAEKRXDM-UHFFFAOYSA-N; Li_{3}As_{7}: InChI=1S/As7.3Li/c1-4-2-6-5(1)7(6)3-4;;;/q-3;3*+1 Key: NEEYWAPSSYXKNR-UHFFFAOYSA-N
- SMILES: Li_{3}As: [Li][As]([Li])[Li]; LiAs: [Li][As]; Li_{3}As_{7}: [Li+].[Li+].[Li+].[As]12[As-][As]3[As-][As]1[As]2[As-]3

Properties
Chemical formula	LiAs; Li_{3}As; Li_{3}As_{7}
Molar mass	81.86 g.mol−1 (LiAs); 95.74 g⋅mol^{−1} (Li_{3}As); 545.27 g⋅mol^{−1} (Li_{3}As_{7})
Appearance	red-brown
Density	3.71 g/cm^{3}

Structure(LiAs)
Crystal structure	Monoclinic
Space group	P2_{1}/n
Lattice constant	a = 9.54 Å, b = 5.24 Å, c = 5.79 Å α = 90°, β = 95.267°, γ = 90°
Formula units (Z)	8

Structure(Low Temperature Li3As7)
Crystal structure	Orthorhombic
Space group	Pbca
Lattice constant	a = 12.466 Å, b = 22.489 Å, c = 12.592 Å α = 100.5°, β = 101.5°, γ = 104.5°
Lattice volume (V)	3530.1 Å^{3}
Formula units (Z)	16

Related compounds
Other anions	Lithium sulfide; Lithium antimonide
Other cations	Sodium arsenide; Calcium arsenide
- Except where otherwise noted, data are given for materials in their standard state (at 25 °C [77 °F], 100 kPa). Infobox references

Lithium arsenide describes inorganic compounds with the chemical formula Li_{x}As where x can range from about 0.5 to 3. A common derivative is Li_{3}As, which is prepared by the reduction of arsenic with a solution of lithium in ammonia. It can also be produced by heating the elements.

3 Li + As → Li_{3}As

== Other lithium arsenides ==
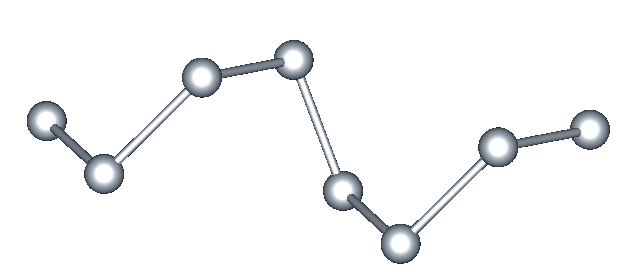
Chain of As atoms in LiAs. The As−As distances are about 2.45 Å.

structure of As^{3−}_{7} cage in Li_{3}As_{7}.

The arsenic-rich arsenides are often classified as zintl phases.
