= Tetraselenium tetranitride =

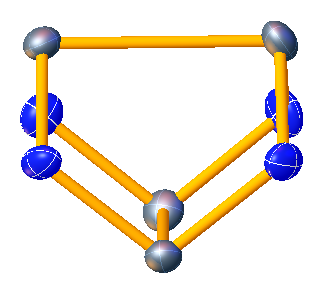

Names
- IUPAC name 2,4,6,8-tetraselena-1,3,5,7-tetrazatricyclo[3.3.0.0^{3,7}]octane
- Other names nitrogen selenide

Identifiers
CAS Number	10102-12-2
3D model (JSmol)	Interactive image
ChemSpider	68007107
PubChem CID	134812014
UNII	K1U2U165UH
CompTox Dashboard (EPA)	DTXSID201349794
- InChI: InChI=1S/N4Se4/c5-1-2-7-3(5)4(6-1)8-2 Key: KEFYKDIPBYQPHW-UHFFFAOYSA-N
- SMILES: N12N3[Se]N([Se]1)N([Se]2)[Se]3

Properties
Chemical formula	Se_{4}N_{4}
Molar mass	371.912 g·mol^{−1}
Appearance	orange solid
Density	4.223 g/cm^{3}

Hazards
- Occupational safety and health (OHS/OSH)
Main hazards	explosive
- Except where otherwise noted, data are given for materials in their standard state (at 25 °C [77 °F], 100 kPa). Infobox references

Tetraselenium tetranitride is the inorganic compound with the formula Se_{4}N_{4}. Like the analogous tetrasulfur tetranitride S_{4}N_{4}, Se_{4}N_{4} is an orange solid. It is however less soluble and more shock-sensitive than S_{4}N_{4}.

As determined by X-ray crystallography, Se_{4}N_{4} adopts a cage structure similar to that of S_{4}N_{4}. The Se−Se and Se−N distances are 2.740 and 1.800 Å, respectively. The N−Se−N angles are 90°.

Among its many reactions, Se_{4}N_{4} reacts with aluminium bromide to form adducts of Se_{2}N_{2}.
