= Potassium nitride =

Names
- IUPAC name Potassium nitride

Identifiers
CAS Number	29285-24-3
3D model (JSmol)	Interactive image
CompTox Dashboard (EPA)	DTXSID901336740
- InChI: InChI=1S/3K.N/q3*+1;-3 Key: TYTMEVSIRLGALE-UHFFFAOYSA-N
- SMILES: [K+].[K+].[K+].[N-3]

Properties
Chemical formula	K_{3}N
Molar mass	131.3016 g/mol
Appearance	Slightly yellow crystalline solid
Melting point	−10 °C (14 °F; 263 K) (decomposes)

Related compounds
Other cations	Lithium nitride Sodium nitride
- Except where otherwise noted, data are given for materials in their standard state (at 25 °C [77 °F], 100 kPa). Infobox references

Potassium nitride is an unstable chemical compound. Several syntheses were erroneously claimed in the 19th century, and by 1894 it was assumed that it did not exist.

However, a synthesis of this compound was claimed in 2004. It is observed to have the anti-TiI_{3} structure below 233 K (−40 °C; −40 °F), although a Li_{3}P-type structure should be more stable. Above this temperature, it converts to an orthorhombic phase. This compound was produced by the reaction of potassium metal and liquid nitrogen at 77 K (−196.2 °C; −321.1 °F) under vacuum:

6K + N_{2} → 2K_{3}N

This compound decomposes back into potassium and nitrogen at room temperature.

This compound is unstable due to steric hindrance.
