= Calcium arsenide =

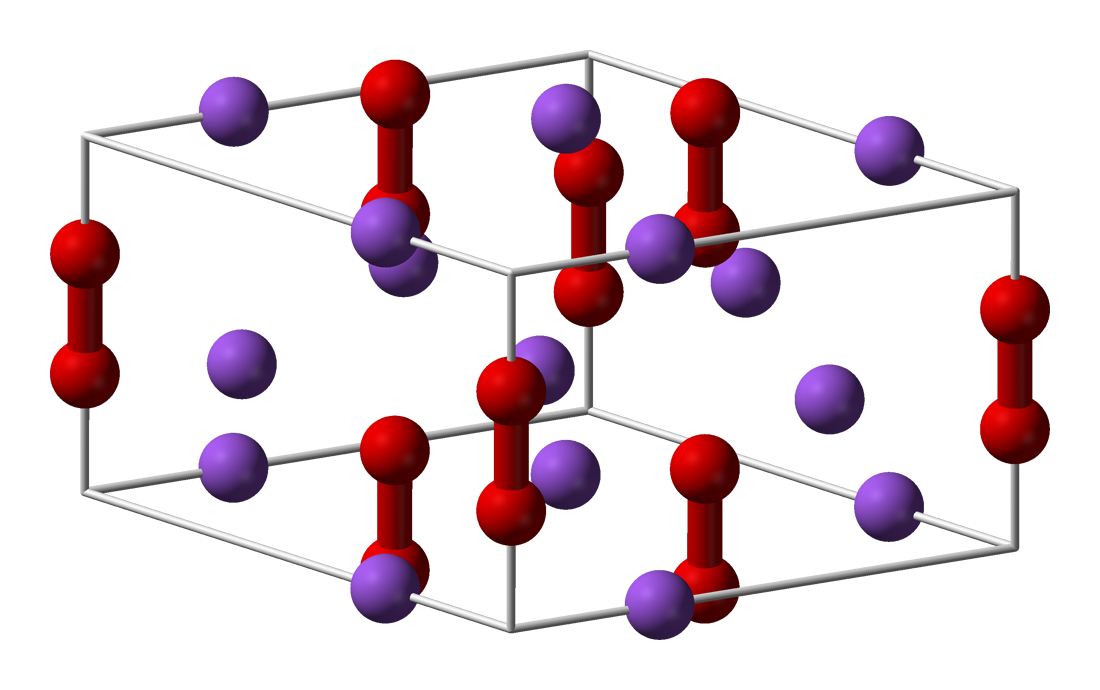

Identifiers
CAS Number	39372-67-3
3D model (JSmol)	Interactive image
ChemSpider	56179
EC Number	248-169-1
PubChem CID	25229865
- InChI: InChI=1S/As.Ca Key: GSYZQGSEKUWOHL-UHFFFAOYSA-N
- SMILES: [Ca+2].[As-2][As-2].[Ca+2]

Properties
Chemical formula	CaAs
Molar mass	115.00
- Except where otherwise noted, data are given for materials in their standard state (at 25 °C [77 °F], 100 kPa). Infobox references

Calcium arsenide is an inorganic compound with the chemical formula Ca_{2}As_{2} and is one of the arsenides of calcium. It is a hexagonal crystal with a space group of P62̅m. It is isostructural with sodium peroxide and can be expressed as (Ca^{2+})_{2}(As-As)^{4−}. It reacts with sodium monoarsenide and silicon in a tantalum container to obtain Na_{4}Ca_{2}SiAs_{4}. It reacts with potassium arsenide, iron arsenide and calcium fluoride at high temperature to obtain KCa_{2}Fe_{4}As_{4}F_{2}.
