= Sodium nitride =

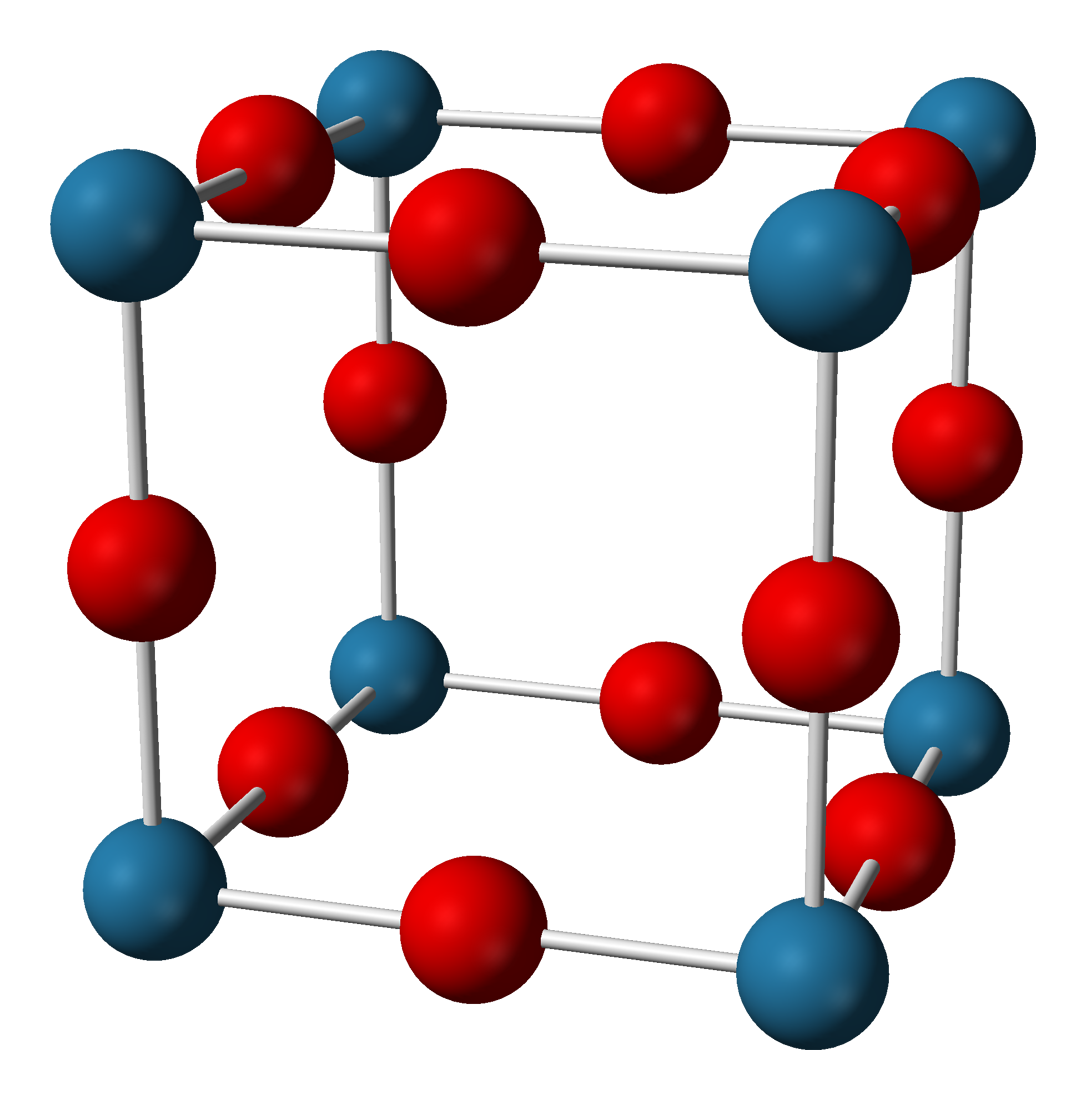

Names
- IUPAC name Sodium nitride

Identifiers
CAS Number	12136-83-3
3D model (JSmol)	Interactive image
ECHA InfoCard	100.032.017
EC Number	235-232-3
- InChI: InChI=1/3Na.N Key: ZOULLXMSYSKRPG-UHFFFAOYNA-N
- SMILES: [Na+].[Na+].[Na+].[N-3]

Properties
Chemical formula	Na_{3}N
Molar mass	82.976 g/mol
Appearance	reddish brown or dark blue solid
Melting point	104 °C (219 °F; 377 K) (decomposes)
Solubility in water	reacts

Structure
Crystal structure	Cubic, cP4
Space group	Pm3̅m

Thermochemistry
Std enthalpy of formation (Δ_{f}H^{⦵}_{298})	-151 J/mol

Related compounds
Other anions	Sodium amide Sodium imide
Other cations	Lithium nitride Potassium nitride
- Except where otherwise noted, data are given for materials in their standard state (at 25 °C [77 °F], 100 kPa). verify (what is ?) Infobox references

Sodium nitride is the inorganic compound with the chemical formula Na_{3}N. In contrast to lithium nitride and some other nitrides, sodium nitride is unstable. It readily decomposes into its elements:

2 Na_{3}N → 6 Na + N_{2}

It can be generated by various methods. The instability of sodium nitride is relevant to the mechanism of action of sodium azide in airbags:

2 NaN_{3} → 2 Na + 3 N_{2}

== Synthesis ==
It can be generated by combining atomic beams of sodium and nitrogen deposited onto a low-temperature sapphire substrate or a metal surface. This synthesis can be further facilitated by introducing liquid Na-K alloy to the compound with the excess liquid removed and washed with fresh alloy. The solid is then separated from the liquid using a centrifuge. However Vajenine’s method is very air-sensitive and can decompose and combust rapidly, so an argon environment is used.

Sodium nitride can be generated also by the thermal decomposition of NaNH_{2}.

== Characteristics ==
Sodium nitride can be of reddish brown or dark blue color depending on the synthetic method. It shows no signs of decomposition after several weeks when at room temperature. The compound does not have a melting point as it decomposes back into its elemental forms as demonstrated using mass spectrometry around 360 K. The estimated enthalpy of formation for the compound is +64 kJ/mol.

== Structure ==
Sodium nitride seems to be about 90% ionic at room temperature, but has the band gap typical for a semiconductor. It adopts the anti-ReO_{3} structure with a simple lattice made up of NNa_{6} octahedra. The compound has N−Na bond lengths of 236.6 pm. This structure has been confirmed through X-ray diffraction and more recently neutron diffraction on powder and single crystals.
