= Cyaphide =

Cyaphide anion
- ^{−}C≡P

Names
- IUPAC name Cyaphide
- Other names Methanidylidynephosphane

Identifiers
3D model (JSmol)	Interactive image
PubChem CID	101418447
- InChI: InChI=1S/CP/c1-2/q-1 Key: UVQWQOUGJCVJLT-UHFFFAOYSA-N
- SMILES: [C-]#P

Properties
Chemical formula	CP^{−}
Molar mass	42.985 g·mol^{−1}
Conjugate acid	Phosphaethyne
- Except where otherwise noted, data are given for materials in their standard state (at 25 °C [77 °F], 100 kPa). Infobox references

In chemistry, the cyaphide ion (C≡P^{−}) is an anionic organophosphorus species that possesses a triple bond between carbon and phosphorus. It is the heavier, phosphorus-containing analogue of cyanide (C≡N^{−}). Organic compounds containing the related R−C≡P functional group are called phosphaalkynes and are phosphorus analogues of organic nitriles (R−C≡N).

The word cyaphide was first coined in 1992, by analogy with cyanide.

== Synthesis ==
=== Initial synthesis ===
The first metal cyaphide compound was synthesized by Angelici and co-workers in 1992 as the bimetallic coordination complex [Pt(PEt_{3})_{2}Cl(μ_{2}−CP)Pt(PEt_{3})_{2}]. The compound features a cyaphido ligand bonded to one platinum center in a terminal fashion through the carbon atom (κC coordination) and bonded side-on to a second platinum center through both the carbon and phosphorus atoms (η^{2} coordination). The complex was generated by reaction of the unobserved intermediate trans-[Pt(PEt_{3})_{2}Cl(CP)] with the platinum(0) complex [Pt(PEt_{3})_{4}].

A further fourteen years passed before a transition metal complex containing a terminal cyaphide ligand was isolated.

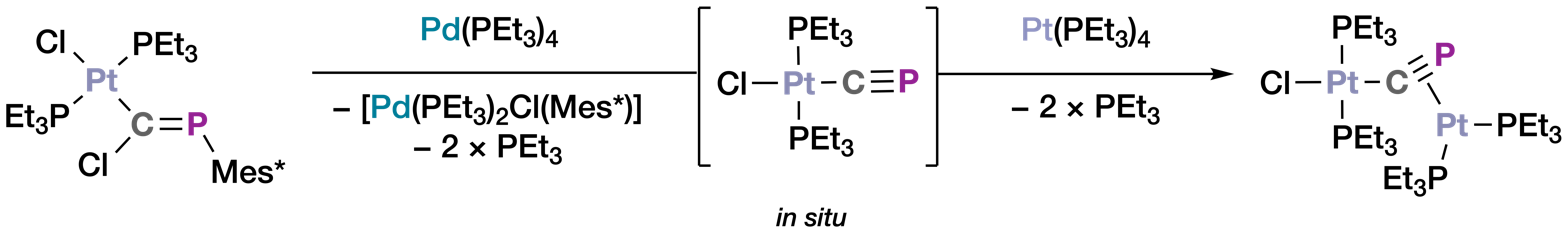
Synthesis of the stable platinum(II)/platinum(0) bridging cyaphide complex.

=== Through elimination of silyl ethers ===
A second strategy for the synthesis of cyaphide complexes uses the formation of strong silicon–oxygen bonds as a thermodynamic driving force. Reaction of a boron compound containing an acyl chloride functional group with lithium bis(trimethylsilyl)phosphide forms a cyaphide ligand on the boron center through elimination of hexamethyldisiloxane (HMDSO). The resulting anionic borate can be regarded as an anionic phosphaalkyne.

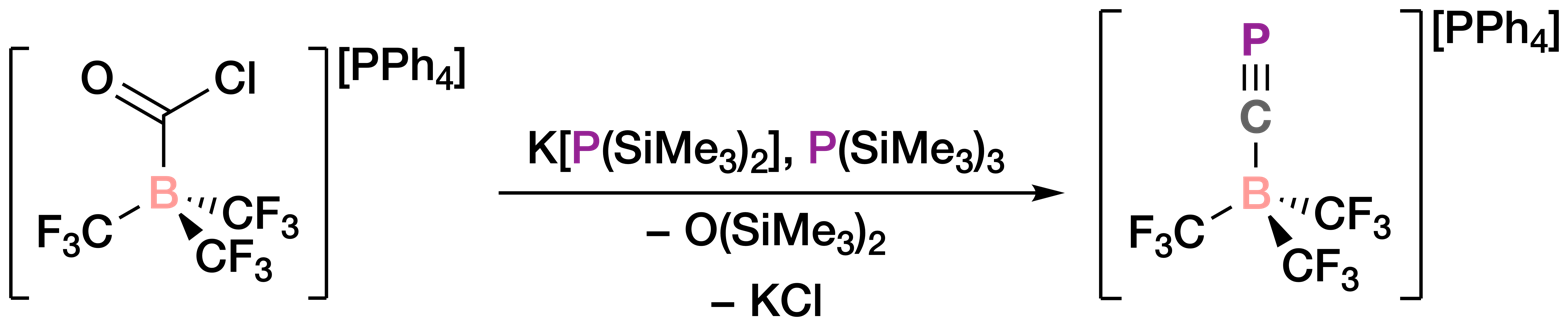
Synthesis of the cyaphidoborate salt.

It is worth noting that the analogous cyaarside ion (C≡As^{−}) derivative of this anionic borate can be accessed by the same method using the corresponding arsenic reagents.

A similar strategy was used for the synthesis of the ruthenium complex trans-[Ru(dppe)_{2}(H)(CP)], which was first prepared in 2006. Grützmacher and co-workers showed that reaction of the cationic phosphaalkyne complex trans-[Ru(dppe)_{2}(H)(PC−SiPh_{3})]^{+} with sodium phenoxide afforded the first example of a terminal transition metal cyaphide complex, trans-[Ru(dppe)_{2}(H)(CP)]. It is thought that the cyaphide ligand is initially generated bound to the ruthenium center through the phosphorus atom (κP coordination), but rapidly rearranges to give the more thermodynamically stable κC isomer.

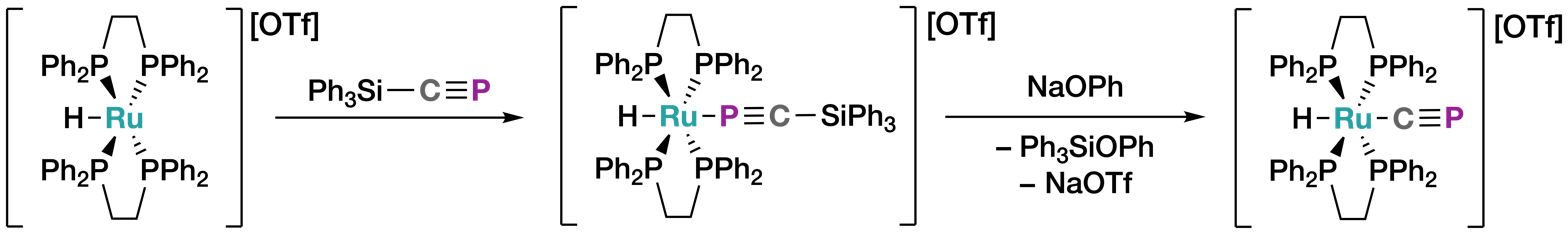
Synthesis of the ruthenium(II) cyaphide complex.

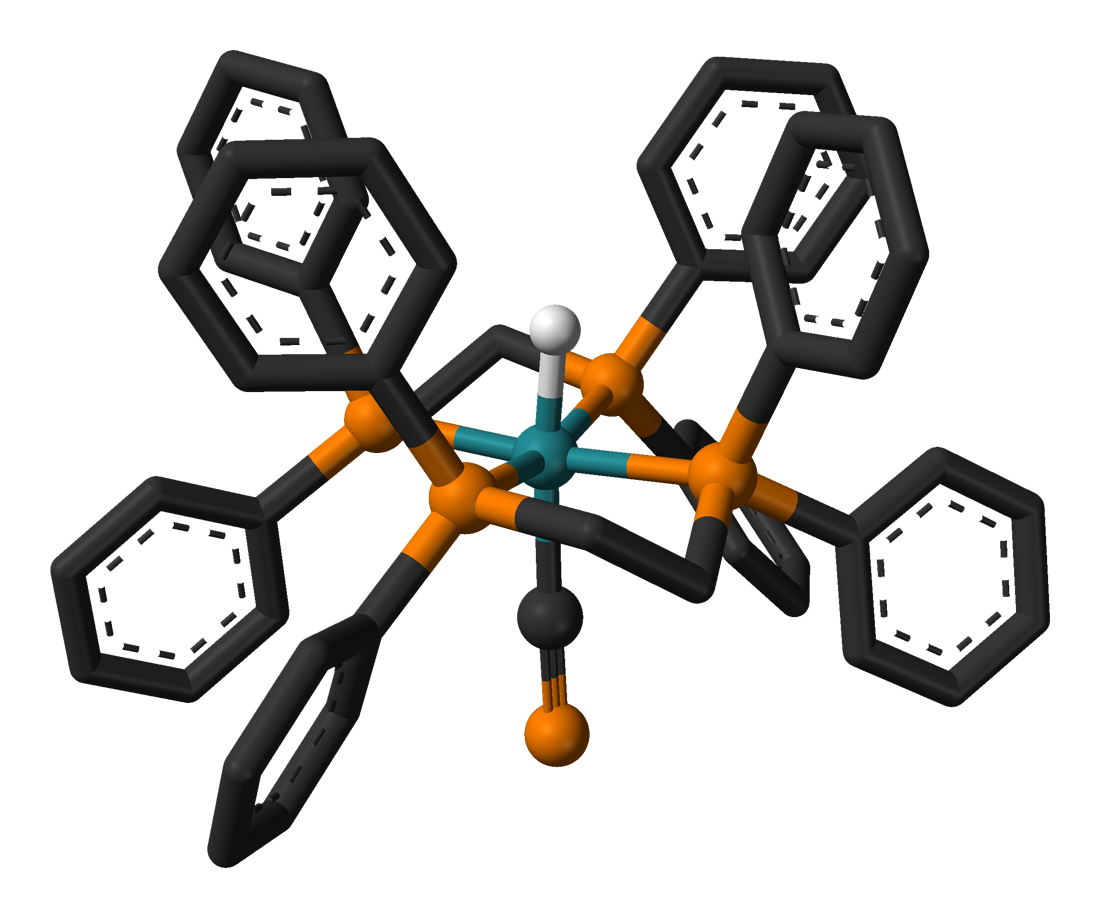
Molecular structure of the first terminal transition metal cyaphide complex trans-[Ru(dppe)_{2}(H)(CP)].

=== From the phosphaethynolate anion ===
Sodium phosphaethynolate, NaOCP, is a salt containing the phosphaethynolate ion (O−C≡P^{−}). Like cyaphide, phosphaethynolate contains a carbon–phosphorus multiple bond and can be used as a precursor to cyaphide complexes. This approach was first used to generate a uranium cyaphide complex by reaction of two molar equivalents of a uranium(III) complex with sodium phosphaethynolate. The reaction produces a bimetallic complex containing two uranium centers in the formal oxidation state of +4. The complex contains a μ_{2}-bridging oxo ligand and a cyaphide ligand bonded to one of the uranium centers.

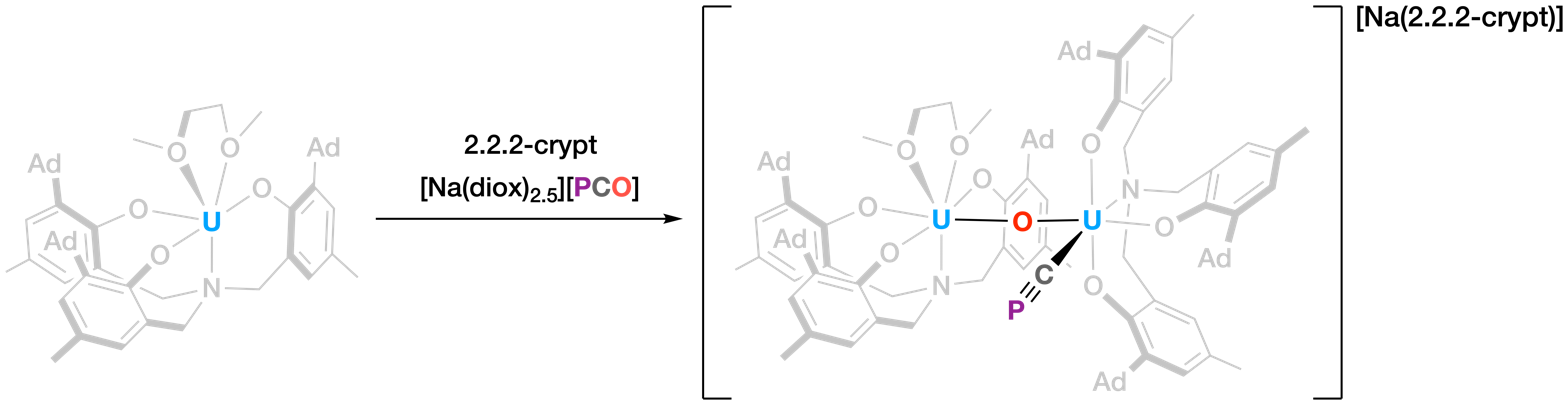
Synthesis of the bimetallic uranium(IV) cyaphide complex.

A related strategy was developed by Goicoechea and co-workers for the synthesis of a magnesium cyaphide transfer reagent. Reaction of the silylated phosphaethynolate compound (^{i}Pr_{3}Si)O−C≡P with the reducing magnesium(I) dimer [Mg(^{Dipp}NacNac)]_{2} in the presence of dioxane affords an equimolar mixture of [Mg(^{Dipp}NacNac)(dioxane)(OSi^{i}Pr_{3})] and [Mg(^{Dipp}NacNac)(dioxane)(CP)]. The latter compound behaves as a Grignard reagent-like cyaphide transfer reagent and can transfer the cyaphide ion to other metal centers through salt metathesis reactions.

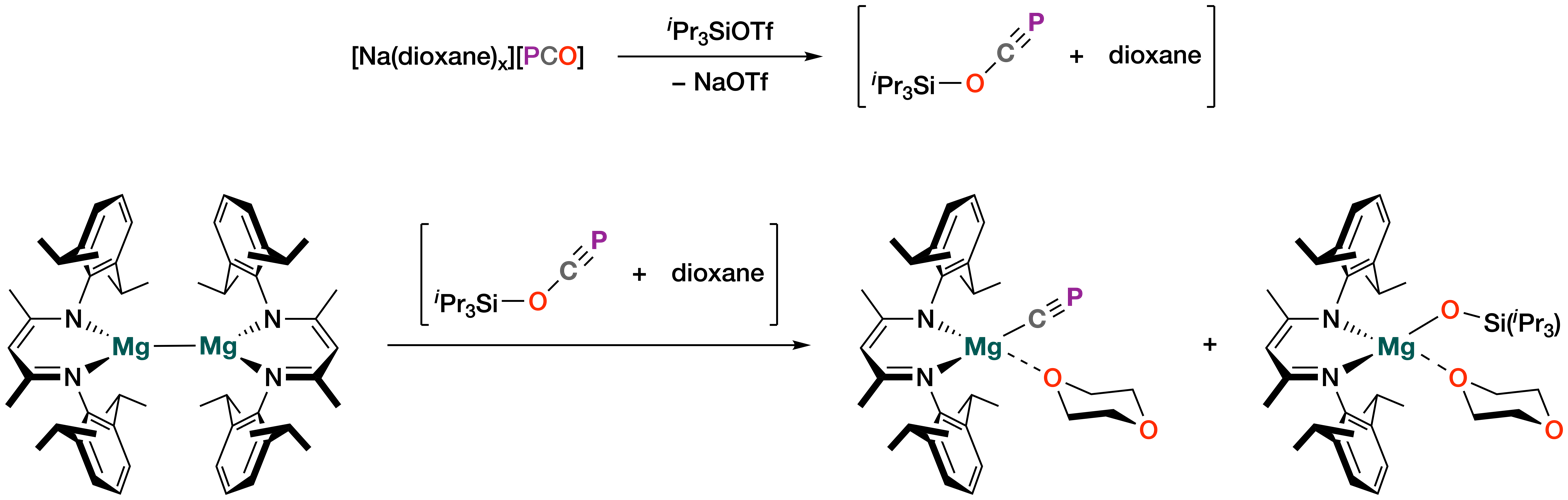
Synthesis of the magnesium(II) cyaphide complex and the siloxide byproduct.

=== By the photolysis of aryl-phosphaalkyne complexes ===
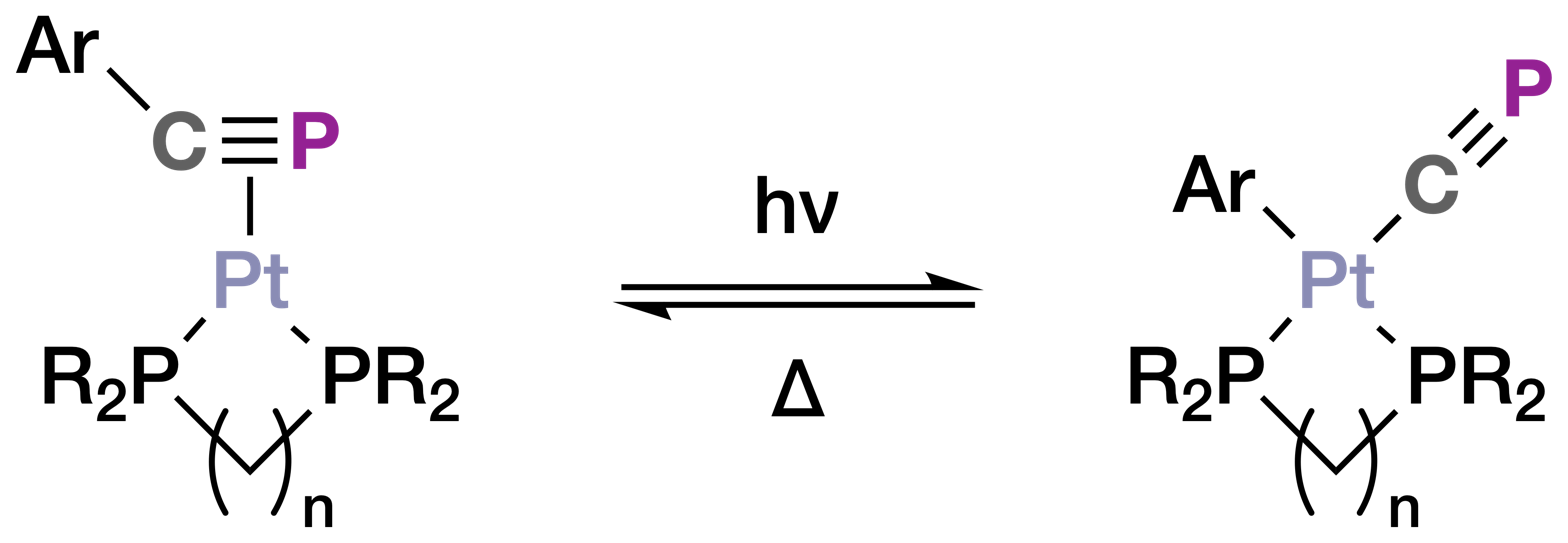
Synthesis of the platinum(II) cyaphide complexes.

The photolysis of platinum(0) complexes containing aryl phosphaalkynes has been shown to undergo oxidative addition reactions to afford platinum(II) cyaphide complexes. These reactions are thermally reversible and undergo reductive elimination reactions to regenerate the corresponding phosphaalkyne precursors above room temperature.

== Coordination Modes ==
As with its lighter congener cyanide, the cyaphide ion is used in coordination chemistry as a ligand and forms coordination complexes with elements from the s-block, p-block, d-block, and f-block of the periodic table. It binds to metal centers through the more electronegative carbon atom in a κC fashion, forming terminal cyaphido complexes with near-linear M–C–P bond angles.

=== Bridging coordination modes ===
In bimetallic complexes, the cyaphide ion can bridge metal centers in two distinct coordination modes. In the first, the ligand binds to one metal through the carbon atom and to a second metal through its π-bonding system in an η^{2} fashion. An example of this binding mode is found in the first reported metal cyaphide complex, Angelici's [Pt(PEt_{3})_{2}Cl(μ_{2}−CP)Pt(PEt_{3})_{2}] complex. This coordination mode is commonly described as η^{1}:η^{2}, or as a σ+π bonding mode.

The cyaphide ion can also bridge two metal centers in an approximately linear metal–cyaphide–metal arrangement, with each metal bound through one end of the ligand. This coordination mode is described as η^{1}:η^{1}, or σ+σ bonding. A representative example was reported by Goicoechea and co-workers in the trimetallic complex [{Fe(depe)_{2}}_{3}(μ−CP)_{2}][OTf]_{2}.

== Structure and Bonding ==
The carbon–phosphorus triple bond in the cyaphide ion represents an exception to the so-called double bond rule, which suggests that heavier p-block elements such as phosphorus generally disfavor the formation of strong multiple bonds with carbon relative to their lighter congeners. Cyaphide complexes typically feature carbon–phosphorus bond lengths of approximately 1.55 Å, in close agreement with the theoretical carbon–phosphorus triple-bond length of 1.54 Å predicted by Pekka Pyykkö.

The electronic structure of the cyaphide ion is similar to that of cyanide. Its highest occupied molecular orbital (HOMO) is strongly polarized toward the carbon atom and can be described predominantly as a carbon-centered lone pair. The degenerate lowest unoccupied molecular orbital (LUMO) and LUMO+1 correspond to the C≡P π* antibonding orbitals, which are substantially less polarized than the analogous C≡N π* orbitals of cyanide.

Because the C≡P π bonds arise from relatively inefficient orbital overlap between the carbon 2p and phosphorus 3p atomic orbitals, the cyaphide ion has a comparatively smaller π–π* energy gap. The low-lying π* orbitals give rise to much of the characteristic LUMO-driven reactivity of the cyaphide ion.

== Reactivity ==
=== Cyclization reactions ===
Cyaphide complexes can undergo cyclization reactions and therefore serve as useful precursors to phosphorus-containing heterocycles. For example, the gold N-heterocyclic carbene cyaphide complex [Au(IDipp)(CP)] has been shown to react with organic azides in a [3+2] cyclization reaction to form five-membered triazaphosphole complexes. This transformation is related to the well-known click chemistry of azide–alkyne cycloaddition reactions. The resulting heterocycles can be released from the gold center by reaction with iodine.

=== Oligomerization reactions ===
Metal cyaphido complexes, particularly those containing highly polar metal–carbon bonds, are known to undergo oligomerization, often necessitating the use of sterically demanding ligands for stabilization. For example, trimerization of the unobserved monometallic scandium cyaphide complex [Sc(Cp*)_{2}(CP)] has been reported to afford the cyclic trimetallic triphosphabenzene complex [Sc(Cp*)_{2}(CP)]_{3}.

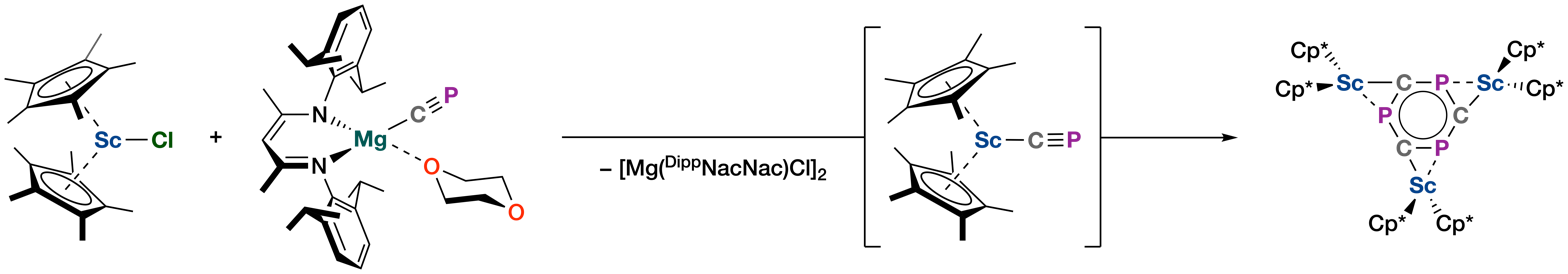
Synthesis of the trimetallic scandium(III) complex from the trimerization of the proposed intermediate [Sc(Cp*)2(CP)].

This behavior contrasts with that of the gold cyaphide complex [Au(IDipp)(CP)], which does not oligomerize despite having a less sterically protected cyaphide ligand. Its greater stability toward oligomerization has been attributed to a more covalent metal–cyaphide interaction.

Examples of dimerization and tetramerization have also been reported for nickel cyaphide complexes and complexes of the larger rare-earth elements, respectively.

== See also ==
- Phosphaalkyne (R−C≡P)
- Methylidynephosphane (H−C≡P)
- Cyanide
- Cyaarside
