= Phosphaalkyne =

Class of chemical compounds

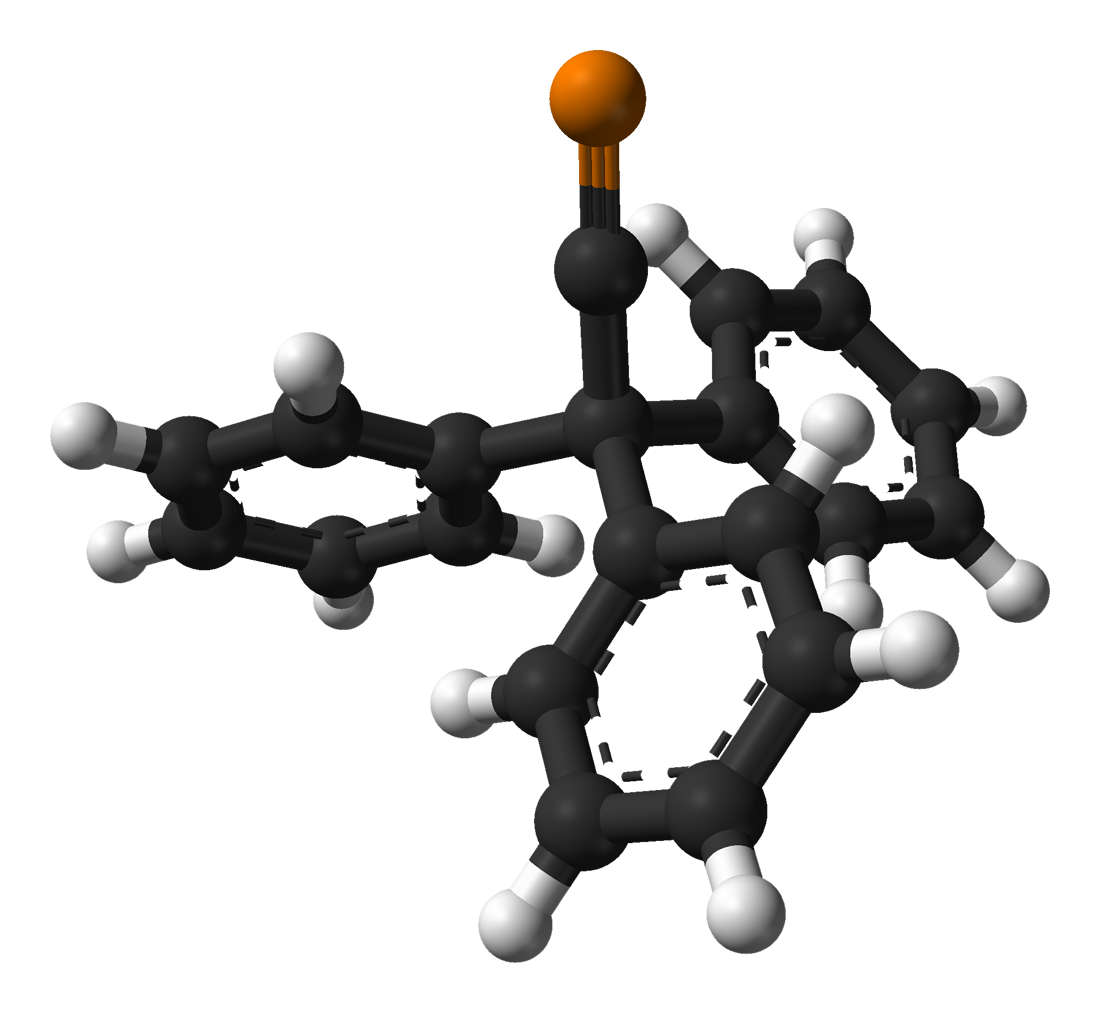
Molecular structure of triphenylmethylphosphaacetylene, a phosphaalkyne.

In chemistry, a phosphaalkyne (IUPAC name: alkylidynephosphane) is an organophosphorus compound containing a triple bond between phosphorus and carbon with the general chemical formula R−C≡P. Phosphaalkynes are the heavier congeners of nitriles, though, due to the similar electronegativities of phosphorus and carbon, possess reactivity patterns reminiscent of alkynes. Due to their high reactivity, phosphaalkynes are not found naturally on earth, but the simplest phosphaalkyne, phosphaethyne (H−C≡P) has been observed in the interstellar medium.

== Synthesis ==
=== From phosphine gas ===
The first of preparation of a phosphaalkyne was achieved in 1961 when Thurman Gier produced phosphaethyne by passing phosphine gas at low pressure over an electric arc produced between two carbon electrodes. Condensation of the gaseous products in a −196 °C (−321 °F) trap revealed that the reaction had produced acetylene, ethylene, and phosphaethyne, which were identified by infrared spectroscopy.

Gier's 1961 synthesis of phosphaethyne from low-pressure phosphine via electric discharge by carbon electrodes.

=== By elimination reactions ===
==== Elimination of hydrogen halides ====
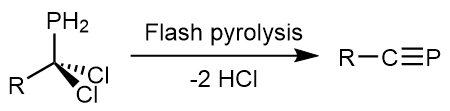
Synthesis of substituted phosphaalkynes by flash pyrolysis of substituted dichloromethylphosphines. Here, R = CH_{3}, CH=CH_{2}, Cl, or F.

Following the initial synthesis of phosphaethyne, it was realized that the same compound can be prepared more expeditiously via the flash pyrolysis of methyldichlorophosphine (CH_{3}PCl_{2}), resulting in the loss of two equivalents of hydrogen chloride. This methodology has been utilized to synthesize numerous substituted phosphaalkynes, including the methyl, vinyl, chloride, and fluoride derivatives. Fluoromethylidynephosphane (F−C≡P) can also be prepared via the potassium hydroxide promoted dehydrofluorination of trifluoromethylphosphine (CF_{3}PH_{2}). It is speculated that these reactions generally proceed via an intermediate phosphaethylene with general structure RClC=PH. This hypothesis has found experimental support in the observation of F_{2}C=PH by ^{31}P NMR spectroscopy during the synthesis of F−C≡P.

==== Elimination of chlorotrimethylsilane ====
The high strength of silicon–halogen bonds can be leveraged toward the synthesis of phosphaalkynes. Heating bis-trimethylsilylated methyldichlorophosphines (((CH_{3})_{3}Si)_{2}C(R)−PCl_{2}) under vacuum results in the expulsion of two equivalents of chlorotrimethylsilane and the ultimate formation of a new phosphaalkyne. This synthetic strategy has been applied in the synthesis of 2-phenylphosphaacetylene and 2-trimethylsilylphosphaacetylene. As in the case of synthetic routes reliant upon the elimination of a hydrogen halide, this route is suspected to involve an intermediate phosphaethylene species containing a C=P double bond, though such a species has not yet been observed.

==== Elimination of hexamethyldisiloxane ====
Like the preceding method, the most popular method for synthesizing phosphaalkynes is reliant upon the expulsion of products containing strong silicon-element bonds. Specifically, it is possible to synthesize phosphaalkynes via the elimination of hexamethyldisiloxane (HMDSO) from certain silylated phosphaalkenes with the general structure RO−(Me_{3}Si)C=P−SiMe_{3}. These phosphaalkenes are formed rapidly following the synthesis of the appropriate acyl bis(trimethylsilyl)phosphine, which undergoes a rapid [1,3]-silyl shift to produce the relevant phosphaalkene. This synthetic strategy is particularly appealing because the precursors (an acyl chloride and tris(trimethylsilyl)phosphine or bis(trimethylsilyl)phosphide) are either readily available or simple to synthesize.

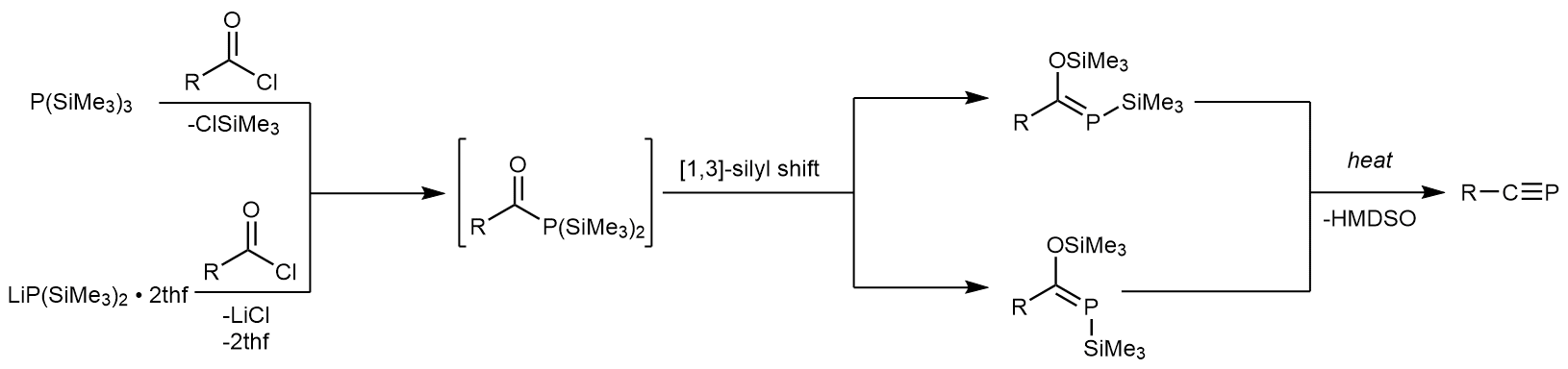
Synthesis of substituted phosphaalkynes via the intermediate silylated phosphaalkene. Heating these phosphaalkenes results in the formation of a phosphaalkyne and the expulsion of hexamethyldisiloxane (HMDSO).

This method has been utilized to produce a variety of kinetically stable phosphaalkynes, including aryl, tertiary alkyl, secondary alkyl, and even primary alkyl phosphaalkynes in good yields.

=== By rearrangement of a putative phospha-isocyanide ===
Dihalophospaalkenes of the general form R−P=CX_{2}, where X is Cl, Br, or I, undergo lithium-halogen exchange with organolithium reagents to yield intermediates of the form R−P=CXLi. These species then eject the corresponding lithium halide salt, LiX, to putatively give a phospha-isocyanide, which can rearrange, much in the same way as an isocyanide, to yield the corresponding phosphaalkyne.

Simulation suggests that simple isophosphiles are not triple-bonded between P and C; instead both atoms bear a lone pair.

=== Other methods ===
It has been demonstrated by Cummins and coworkers that thermolysis of compounds of the general form C_{14}H_{10}PC(=PPh_{3})R leads to the extrusion of C_{14}H_{10} (anthracene), triphenylphosphine, and the corresponding substituted phosphaacetylene: R−C≡P. Unlike the previous method, which derives the phosphaalkyne substituent from an acyl chloride, this method derives the substituent from a Wittig reagent.

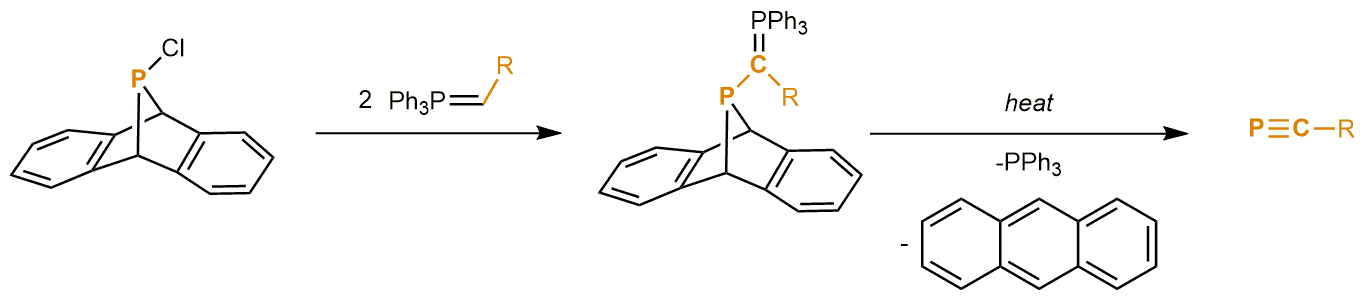
Synthesis of phosphaalkynes from an anthracene based phosphine chloride and a Wittig reagent, as demonstrated by Cummins and coworkers. Here, R = H, Me, Et, ^{i}Pr, or ^{s}Bu.

== Structure and bonding ==
The carbon-phosphorus triple bond in phosphaalkynes represents an exception to the so-called "double bond rule", which would suggest that phosphorus tends not to form multiple bonds to carbon, and the nature of bonding within phosphaalkynes has therefore attracted much interest from synthetic and theoretical chemists. For simple phosphaalkynes such as H−C≡P and Me−C≡P, the carbon-phosphorus bond length is known by microwave spectroscopy, and for certain more complex phosphaalkynes, these bond lengths are known from single-crystal X-ray diffraction experiments. These bond lengths can be compared to the theoretical bond length for a carbon-phosphorus triple bond predicted by Pekka Pyykkö of 1.54 Å. By bond length metrics, most structurally characterized alkyl and aryl substituted phosphaalkynes contain triple bonds between carbon and phosphorus, as their bond lengths are either equal to or less than the theoretical bond distance.

Table of some representative C–P bond lengths in several substituted phosphaalkynes with general form R−C≡P.
R	Bond Length (Å)
H	1.5442
Me	1.544(4)
tert-butyl	1.542(2)
triphenylmethyl	1.538(2)
2,4,6-tri(tert-butyl)phenyl	1.533(3)

The carbon-phosphorus bond order in phosphaalkynes has also been the subject of computational inquiry, where quantum chemical calculations have been utilized to determine the nature of bonding in these molecules from first principles. In this context, natural bond orbital (NBO) theory has provided valuable insight into the bonding within these molecules. Lucas and coworkers have investigated the electronic structure of various substituted phosphaalkynes, including the cyaphide anion (−C≡P), using NBO, natural resonance theory (NRT), and quantum theory of atoms in molecules (QTAIM) in an attempt to better describe the bonding in these molecules. For the simplest systems, −C≡P and H−C≡P, NBO analysis suggests that the only relevant resonance structure is that in which there is a triple bond between carbon and phosphorus. For more complex molecules, such as Me−C≡P and Me_{3}C−C≡P, the triple bonded resonance structure is still the most relevant, but accounts for only some of the overall electron density within the molecule (81.5% and 72.1%, respectively). This is due to interactions between the two carbon-phosphorus pi-bonds and the C−H or C−C sigma-bonds of the substituents, which can be visualized by inspecting the C≡P pi-bonding molecular orbitals in these molecules.

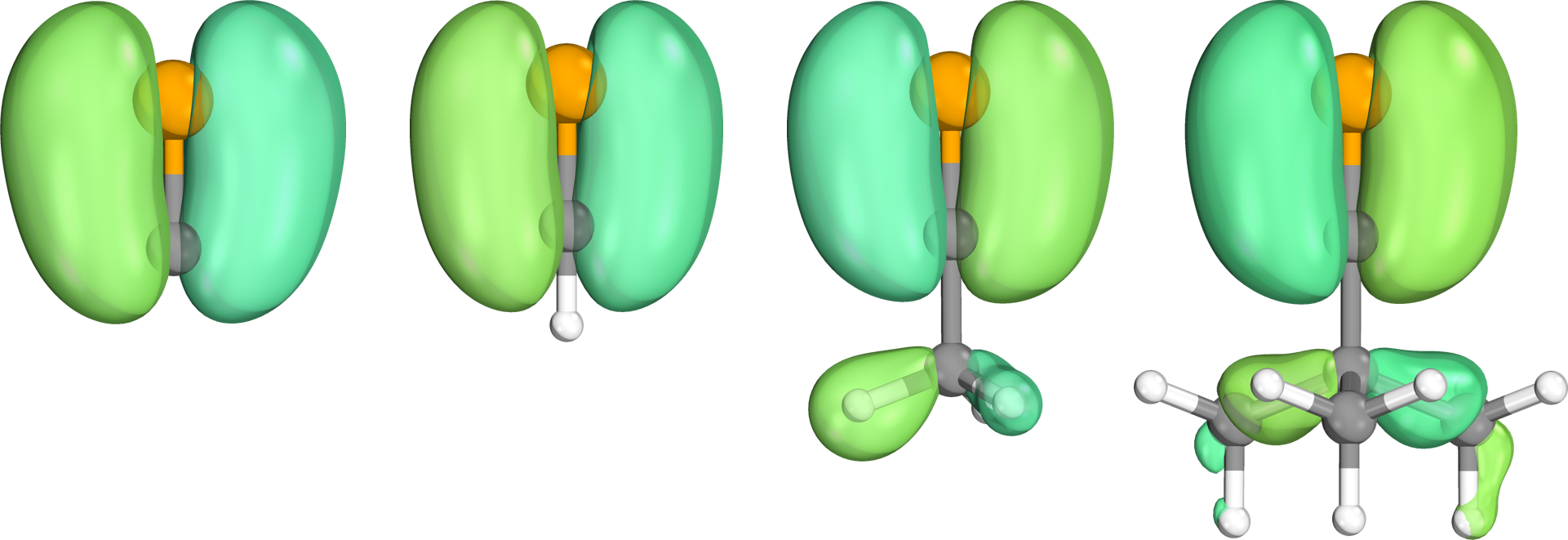
One of two degenerate pi-bonds in various phosphaalkyne species showing the interactions between C≡P pi-bonds and substituent sigma bonds in Me−C≡P and Me_{3}C−C≡P, but not in the cyaphide anion or in H-C≡P. Surfaces were calculated at the B3LYP level of theory using the def2-tzvpp basis set in ORCA. Molecules shown are (from left to right) the cyaphide anion, H−C≡P, Me−C≡P, and Me_{3}C−C≡P. Geometries utilized in creating this figure are those reported by Lucas and coworkers.

== Reactivity ==
Phosphaalkynes possess diverse reactivity profiles, and can be utilized in the synthesis of various phosphorus-containing saturated of unsaturated heterocyclic compounds.

=== Cycloaddition reactivity ===
One of the most developed areas of phosphaalkyne chemistry is that of cycloadditions. Like other multiply bonded molecular fragments, phosphaalkynes undergo myriad reactions such as [1+2]-cycloadditions, [3+2]-cycloadditions, and [4+2]-cycloadditions. This reactivity is summarized in graphical format below, which includes some examples of 1,2-addition reactivity (which is not a form of cycloaddition).

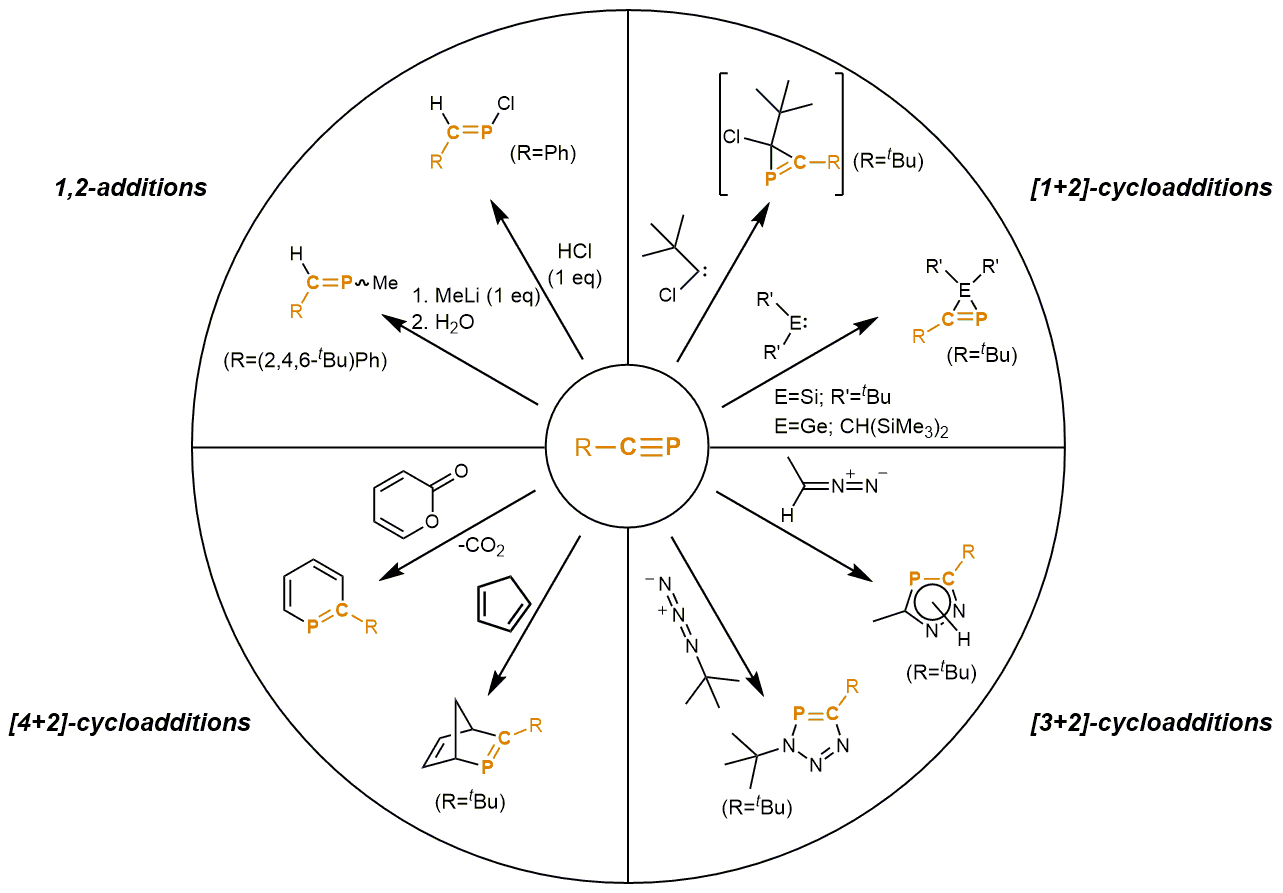
A graphic showing some prototypical reactivity espoused by the phosphaalkyne functional group, including 1,2-additions, [2+1]-cycloadditions, [2+3]-cycloadditions, and [2+4]-cycloadditions. The phosphaalkyne core is shown in orange throughout the graphic.

=== Oligomerization ===
The pi-bonds of phosphaalkynes are weaker than most carbon-phosphorus sigma bonds, rendering phosphaalkynes reactive with respect to the formation of oligomeric species containing more sigma bonds. These oligomerization reactions are triggered thermally, or can be catalyzed by transition or main-group metals.

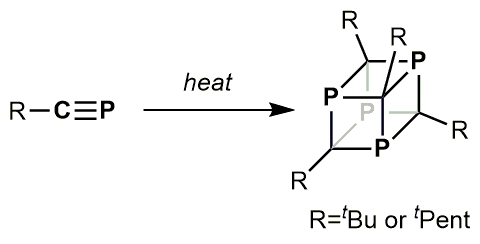
Synthesis of a cuboidal phosphaalkyne tetramer by heating a kinetically stable phosphaalkyne.

==== Uncatalyzed ====
Phosphaalkynes with small substituents (H, F, Me, Ph, etc.) undergo decomposition at or below room temperature by way of polymerization/oligimerization to yield mixtures of products which are challenging to characterize. The same is largely true of kinetically stable phosphaalkynes, which undergo oligomerization reactions at elevated temperature. In spite of the challenges associated with isolating and identifying the products of these oligimerizations, however, cuboidal tetramers of tert-butylphosphaalkyne and tert-pentylphosphaalkyne have been isolated (albeit in low yield) and identified following heating of the respective phosphaalkyne.

Computational chemistry has proved a valuable tool for studying these synthetically complex reactions, and it has been shown that while the formation of phosphaalkyne dimers is thermodynamically favorable, the formation of trimers, tetramers, and higher order oligomeric species tends to be more favorable, accounting for the generation of intractable mixtures upon inducing oligomerization of phosphaalkynes experimentally.

==== Metal-mediated ====
Unlike thermally initiated phosphaalkyne oligomerization reactions, transition metals and main group metals are capable of oligomerizing phosphaalkynes in a controlled manner, and have led to the isolation of phosphaalkyne dimers, trimers, tetramers, pentamers, and even hexamers. A nickel complex is capable of catalytically homocoupling ^{t}Bu−C≡P to yield a diphosphatetrahedrane.

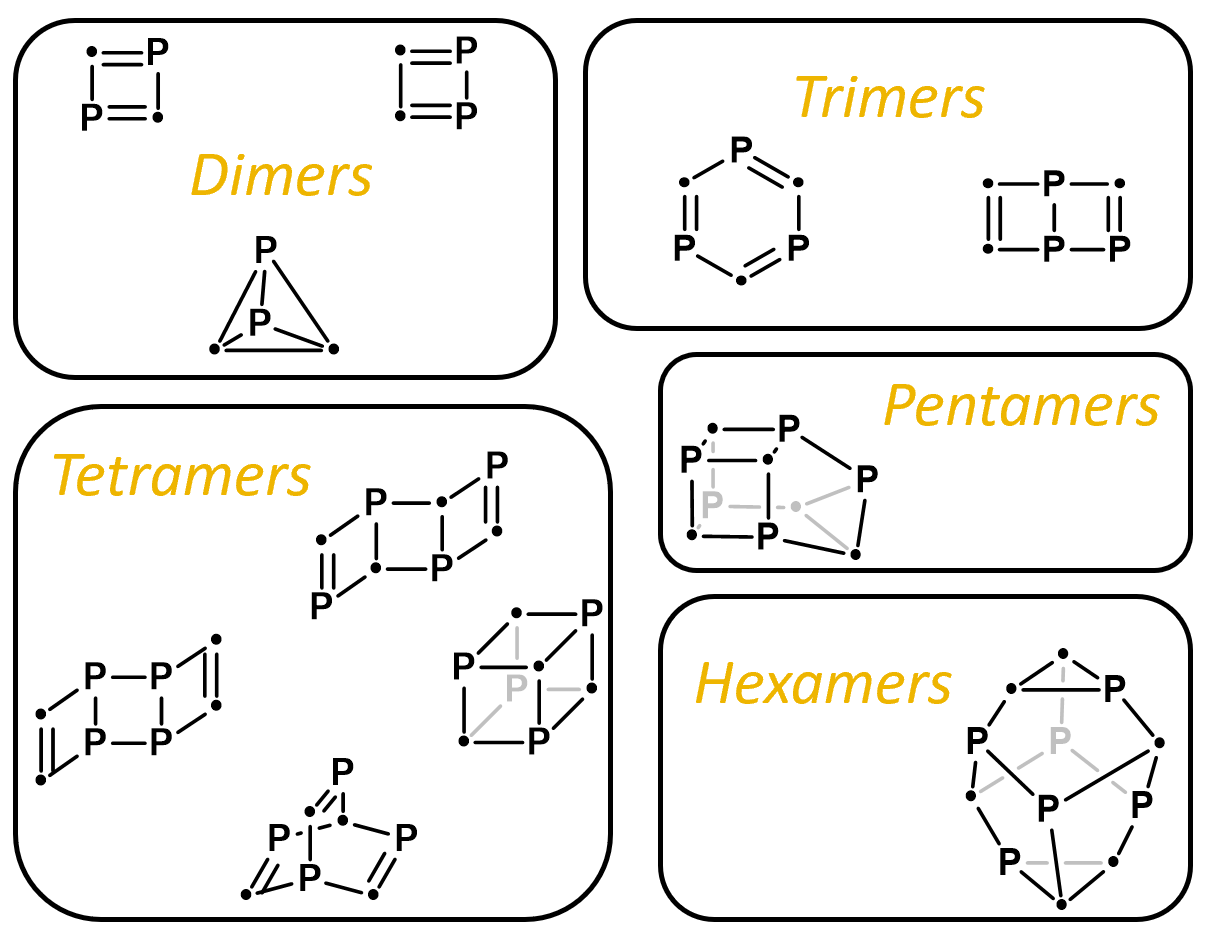
Some of the reported phosphaalkyne oligomers generated upon treatment of a phosphaalkyne (usually ^{t}Bu−C≡P) with a transition metal or main group metal complex. Note that several of these species are unstable in their free forms, and instead exist stably only when bound to a transition metal. In this figure, the • symbols individually represent one C−R unit, and are utilized for clarity.

== See also ==
- Arsaalkyne
- Cyaphide
