= Arsaalkyne =

Organoarsenic compound

Chemical structure of the arsaalkyne As≡C−C_{6}H_{2}-2,4,6-(t-Bu)_{3}.

In chemistry, a arsaalkyne (IUPAC name: alkylidynearsane) is an organoarsenic compound containing a triple bond between arsenic and carbon with the general chemical formula R−C≡As. Arsaalkynes are rare, especially in comparison with the phosphaalkynes. The parent H−C≡As has been characterized spectroscopically, otherwise the only arsaalkynes have bulky organic substituents.

== Synthesis and isolation ==
Arsaalkynes are produced by dehydrohalogenation or related base-induced elimination reactions. The case of HCAs is illustrative:

Cl−CH_{2}−AsH_{2} + 2 Na_{2}CO_{3} → H−C≡As + 2 NaHCO_{3} + 2 NaCl

Owing to the principles of the double bond rule, arsaalkynes tend to oligomerize more readily than the phosphorus analogues. Thus attempts to prepare Me_{3}C−C≡As produce the tetramer, which has a cubane structure. The very bulky substituent −C_{6}H_{2}-2,4,6-(t-Bu)_{3} does however allow the crystallization of the monomeric arsaalkyne. Its As-C bond length is 1.657(7) Å.

== See also ==
- Cyaarside
