= Cyaarside =

Cyaarside anion

Names
- Preferred IUPAC name Cyaarside
- Systematic IUPAC name Arsenidocarbonate(II)
- Other names Cyarside

Identifiers
3D model (JSmol)	Interactive image
- InChI: InChI=1S/CAs/c1-2/q-1 Key: LSOQRAIANSLHSE-UHFFFAOYSA-N
- SMILES: [As]#[C-]

Properties
Chemical formula	CAs^{−}
Molar mass	86.933 g·mol^{−1}
Conjugate acid	Methylidynearsine

Related compounds
Related compounds	CP^{−}; CN^{−}; As≡C−As^{2−}
- Except where otherwise noted, data are given for materials in their standard state (at 25 °C [77 °F], 100 kPa). Infobox references

Cyaarside, also called cyarside, is the ^{−}C≡As anion. Featuring a triple bond between arsenic and carbon, it is the arsenic analogue of cyanide and cyaphide.

== Preparation ==
An actinide cyaarside complex can be prepared by C−O bond cleavage of the arsaethynolate anion [OCAs]^{−}, the arsenic analogue of cyanate and phosphaethynolate. Reaction of the uranium complex [((^{Ad,Me}ArO)_{3}N)U^{III}(DME)] with one molar equivalent of [Na^{+}[OCAs]^{−}(dioxane)_{2.5}] in the presence of 2.2.2-cryptand results in the formation of a dinuclear, oxo-bridged uranium complex featuring a C≡As ligand.

== See also ==
- arsaalkyne (R−C≡As)
