= Methylidynephosphane =

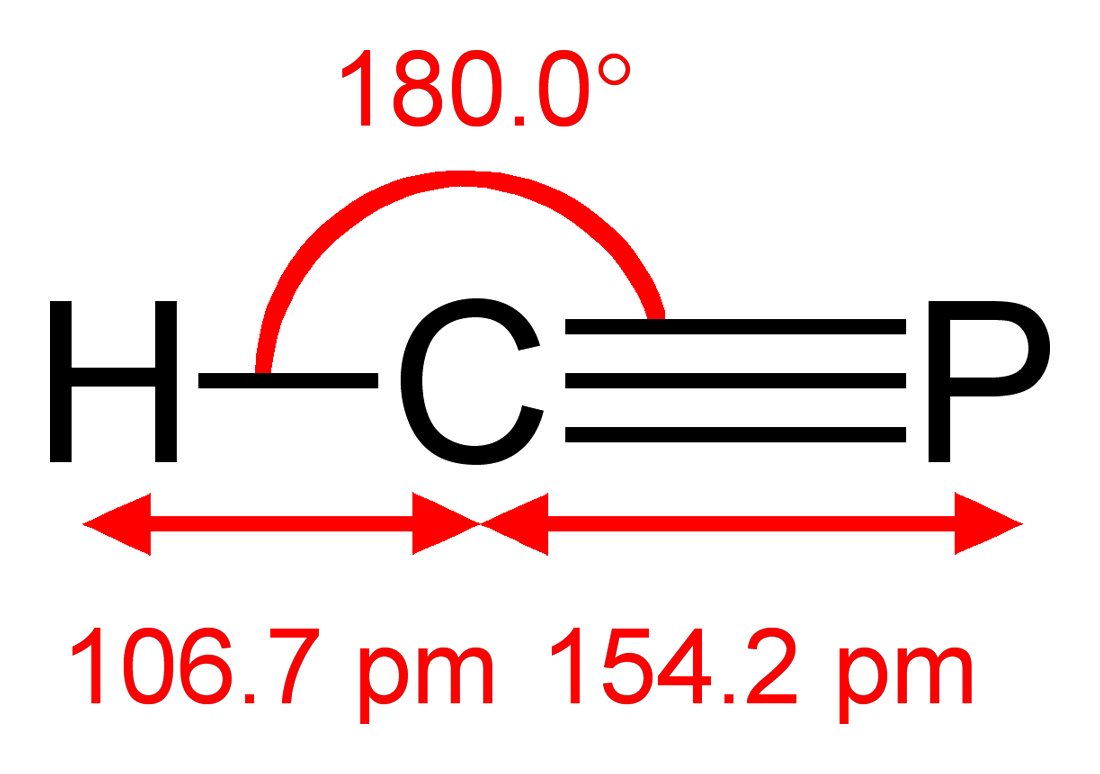
Methylidynephosphane chemical structure
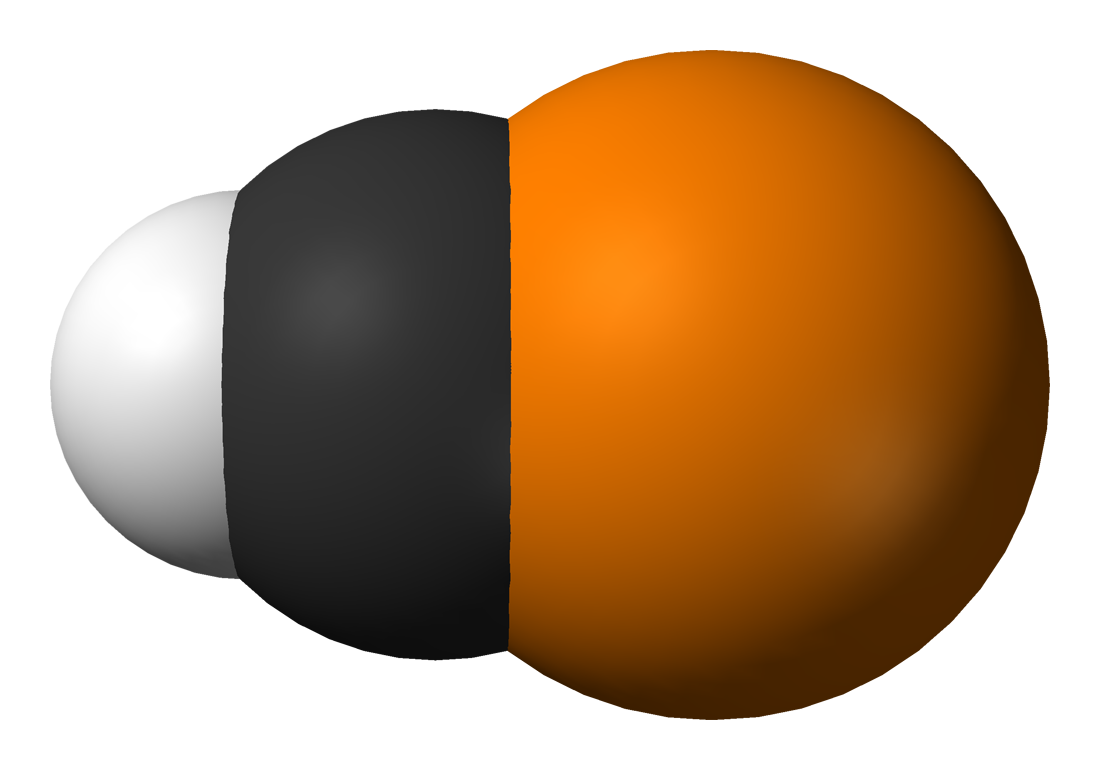
Space filling model

Names
- Preferred IUPAC name Methylidynephosphane
- Other names: Hydrogen cyaphide; Phosphaethyne

Identifiers
CAS Number	6829-52-3
3D model (JSmol)	Interactive image
ChemSpider	122445
PubChem CID	138843
CompTox Dashboard (EPA)	DTXSID80218444
- InChI: InChI=1S/CHP/c1-2/h1H Key: DPYPSJGRRFKXBE-UHFFFAOYSA-N
- SMILES: C#P

Properties
Chemical formula	HCP
Molar mass	43.993 g·mol^{−1}
Conjugate base	Cyaphide
- Except where otherwise noted, data are given for materials in their standard state (at 25 °C [77 °F], 100 kPa). Infobox references

Methylidynephosphane (phosphaethyne) is a chemical compound with the chemical formula HC≡P. It was the first phosphaalkyne compound discovered, containing the unusual C≡P carbon-phosphorus triple bond. Although isolated samples of methylidynephosphane are impractical, other derivatives have been well studied such as tert-butylphosphaacetylene. The conjugate base of methylidynephosphane is cyaphide.

== Description ==
Methylidynephosphane is the phosphorus analogue of hydrogen cyanide, with the nitrile nitrogen replaced by phosphorus. Methylidynephosphane can be synthesized via the reaction of phosphine with carbon, but it is extremely reactive and polymerises readily at temperatures above −120 °C. However, several types of derivatives, with bulky groups, such as tert-butyl or trimethylsilyl, substituted for the hydrogen atom, are much more stable, and are useful reagents for the synthesis of various organophosphorus compounds. The [OCP]^{−} (cyaphate) and [SCP]^{−} (thiocyaphate) anions are also known.

HCP has been detected in the interstellar medium.

== History ==
While the existence of the molecule had been discussed, and early attempts had been made to prepare it, methylidynephosphane was first successfully synthesised in 1961, by T.E. Gier of E. I. duPont de Nemours, Inc. Earlier reports of preparing its sodium salt were reported as unreproducible by Gier. Methylidynephosphane may have contributed to an explosion that killed Vera Bogdanovskaia, an early chemist pursuing it, one of the first female chemists in Russia, and perhaps the first woman to die from her own research.
