= Thiosulfoxide =

Category of chemical compounds

A thiosulfoxide or thiothionyl compound is a chemical compound containing a sulfur to sulfur double bond, with the formula (R−)(R'−)S=S, where R and R' represent any group (typically fluorine, chlorine, alkoxy, alkyl, aryl or other organyl residues. The thiosulfoxide has a molecular shape known as trigonal pyramidal. Its coordination is also trigonal pyramidal. The point group of the thiosulfoxide is C_{s}. A 1982 review concluded that there was as yet no definitive evidence for the existence of stable thiosulfoxides which can be attributed to the double bond rule which states that elements of period 3 and beyond do not form multiple bonds. The related sulfoxides of the type (R−)(R'−)S=O are very common. Many compounds containing a sulfur-sulfur double bond have been reported in the past although only a few verified classes of actually stable compounds exist, closely related to thiosulfoxides.

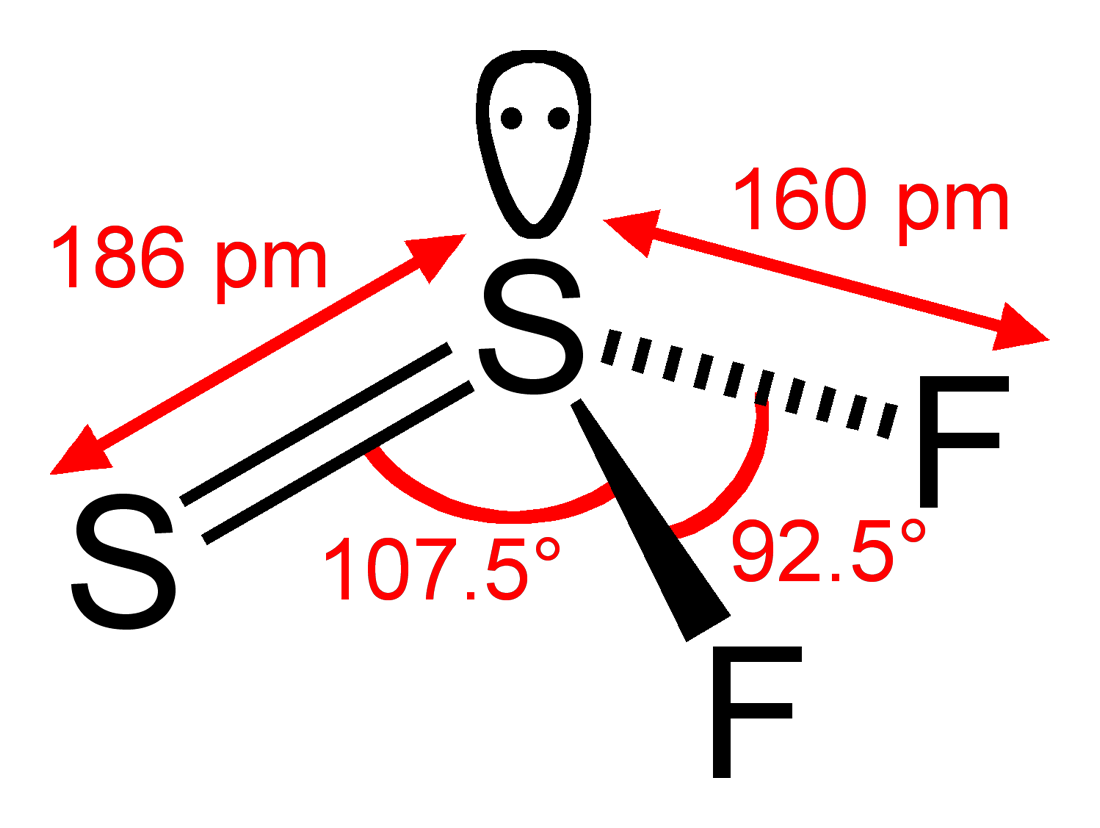
Structure of thiothionyl fluoride, F_{2}S=S

Sulfur-sulfur double bonds can be stabilized with electron-withdrawing groups in so-called thionosulfites of the type (R−O−)(R'−O−)S=S. These compounds can be prepared by reaction of diols with disulfur dichloride. Sulfur halides such as disulfur dichloride, Cl−S−S−Cl, can convert to the branched isomer thiothionyl chloride, Cl_{2}S=S; disulfur difluoride exists as an equilibrium mixture with thiothionyl fluoride, F_{2}S=S, which is thermodynamically more stable. These disulfide isomerizations are occasionally studied in silico.

N-(Thiosulfinyl)amines of the type R−N=S=S are another group of stable compounds containing a S=S bond. The first such compound was prepared in 1974 reaction of the nitroso compound N,N-dimethyl-p-nitrosoaniline with tetraphosphorus decasulfide. Heating to 200 °C extrudes sulfur in this compound and forms the corresponding azo compound. Disulfur monoxide S=S=O is stable at 20 °C for several days.

Occasionally thiosulfates are depicted as having a S=S unit but the sulfur-sulfur bond in it is in fact a single bond.
