= Magnesium(I) dimer =

Compound with a magnesium to magnesium bond

A magnesium(I) dimer is a molecular compound containing a magnesium to magnesium bond (Mg-Mg), giving the metal an apparent +1 oxidation state. Alkaline earth metals are commonly found in the +2-oxidation state, such as magnesium. The M^{2+} are considered as redox-inert, meaning that the +2 state is significant. However, recent advancements in main group chemistry have yielded low-valent magnesium(I) dimers, also given as Mg(I), with the first compound being reported in 2007. They can be generally represented as LMg-MgL, with L being a monoanionic ligand. For example, β-diketiminate, commonly referred to as Nacnac, is a useful chelate regarding these complexes. By tuning the ligand, the thermodynamics of the complex change. For instance, the ability to add substituents onto Nacnac can contribute to the steric bulk, which can affect reactivity and stability. As their discovery has grown, so has their usefulness. They are employed in organic and inorganic reduction reactions. It is soluble in a hydrocarbon solvent, like toluene, stoichiometric, selective, and safe.

== Discovery ==
=== Role of zinc ===
The first zinc(I) dimer was isolated in 2004, with more being synthesized in subsequent years. The chemical similarities between magnesium and zinc led researchers to believe that a Mg(I) dimer could then be achieved. With a calculated stability of Mg—Mg bonded dimers, a synthesis route was needed.

=== Initials calculations and techniques ===
S-block compounds with low oxidation states can be short lived. There are various techniques available for use. However, the generation and detection of these molecules rely on frozen inert gas matrices, low pressures, high temperatures in the gas phase, or a combination of these. This can then be combined with theoretical studies to gain more information regarding the complex. Matrix isolation techniques were carried out for gaining spectroscopic insight on how the Mg(I) dimer may behave.

By heating magnesium diboride, MgB_{2}, at 700 °C with a pressure of 0.1 mbar, and passing HCl gas over it several products are formed, such as magnesium chloride, MgCl. The generation of •MgCl and subsequent compounds from the reaction then underwent further study. At 10 K, the solution was combined with an inert gas, undergoing IR and Raman spectroscopic techniques, combined with density functional theory (DFT) calculations. This showed the monomeric and dimeric Mg(I) halides, •MgCl and ClMgMgCl, a linear molecule. While these studies were useful in gaining more insight on the Mg-Mg bond characteristics, it failed to yield a stable Mg(I) dimer in ambient conditions.

== Synthesis ==
=== Precursors ===
The stability of the Mg-Mg bond needed to be dealt with. Researchers began to investigate sterically demanding guanidinates and amidinates. Their stabilizing abilities in low-oxidation state chemistry was attractive since it allowed for other low-valent main group complexes to be achieved. This research also allowed for the first stable dimer Mg(I) dimer, [{(Priso)Mg}_{2}]. Potassium reduction of heteroleptic Mg(II) iodide precursor complexes were then carried out. The ligands guanidinato and, β-diketiminato Mg(II) iodide etherate complexes can be prepared from free NH ligands and methyl magnesium iodide in diethyl ether. An example of the synthesis of the precursor synthesis can be shown below. An additional precursor synthesis is shown, needed for [{(^{tBu}Nacnac)Mg}_{2}], which can be explained in the section below.

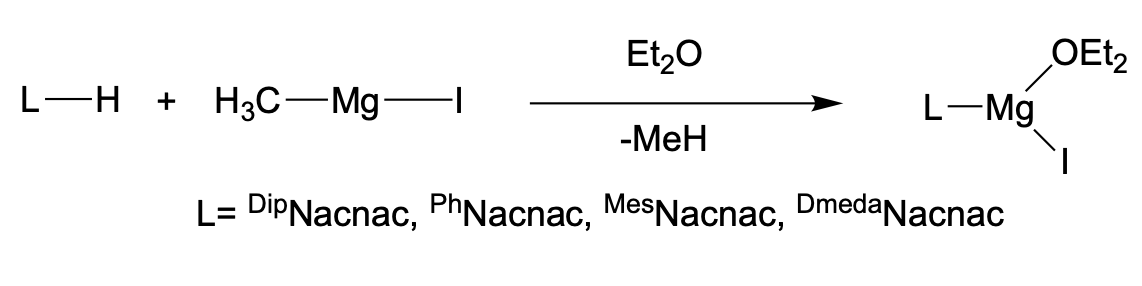
Gives the general synthetic route with a Grignard reagent for the precursor molecule needed in order to synthesize a Mg(I) dimer.

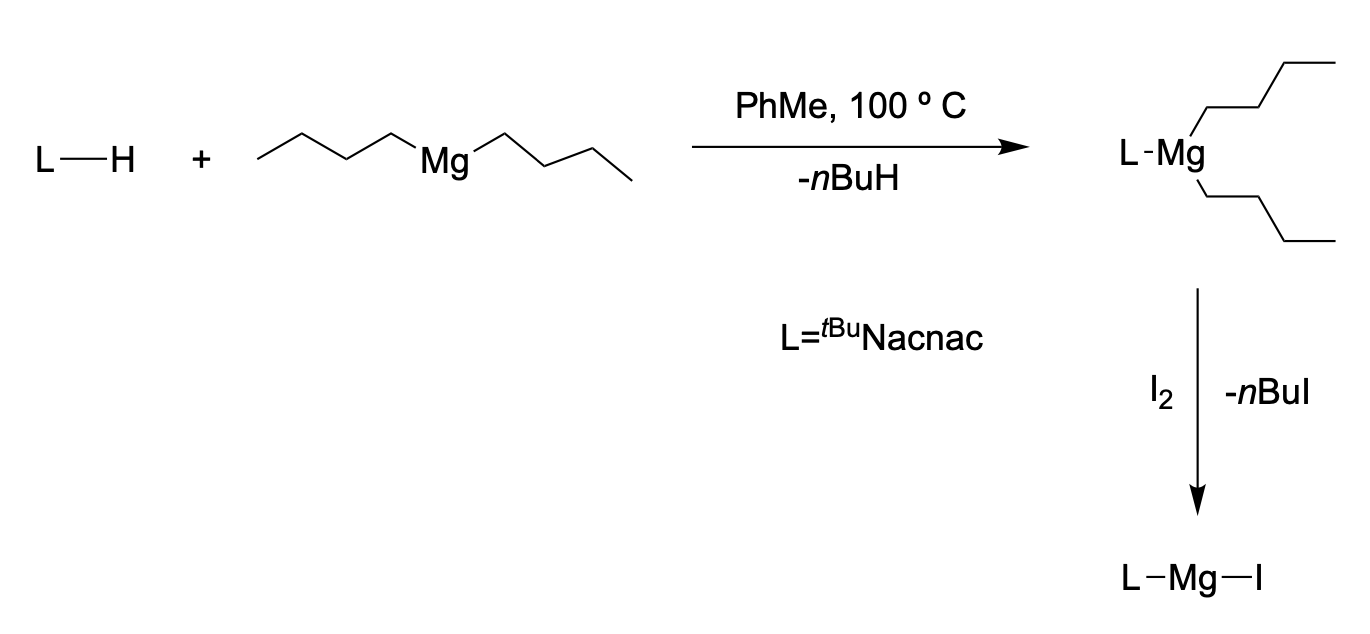
Shows the synthetic route for the precursor molecule needed in order to synthesize a Mg(I) dimer.

=== Mg(I) dimer species ===
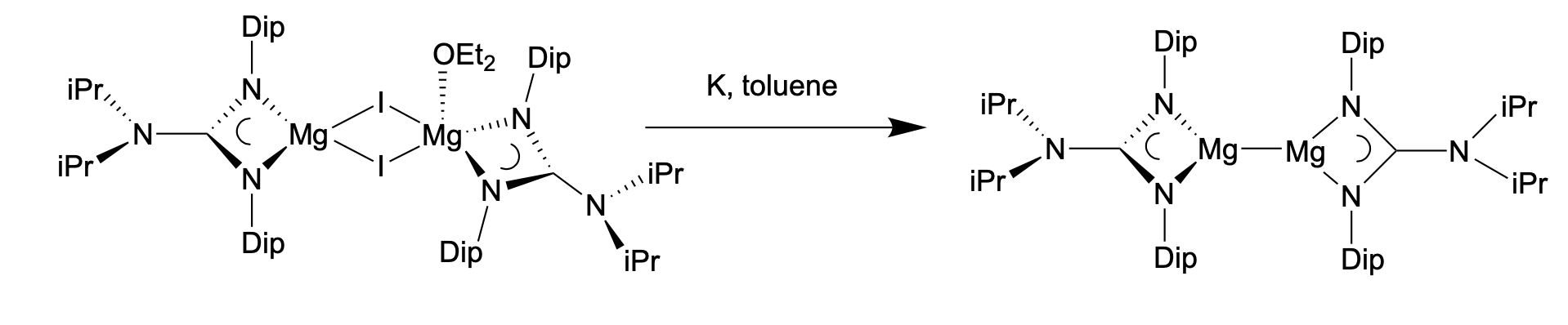
Successful synthesis of [{(Priso)Mg}^{2}].

Reducing the species and its related precursors with sodium or potassium have given dimeric magnesium(I) compounds such as [{(Priso)Mg}_{2}] and other compounds with substituted versions of β-diketiminato. These compounds, with a general formula of [{(ArNacnac)Mg}_{2}]. However, as the size of the substituent on Nacnac decreased, the difficulty to isolate a magnesium(I) dimer increased. This can be shown by phenol, where only a Mg(II) dimer was gained, given by [(PhNacnac)_{2}Mg]. For a bulkier analogue such as [{(^{tBu}Nacnac)Mg}_{2}] a different synthesis route was carried out. Dibutyl magnesium and iodine were chosen since the free β -diketimine, tBuNacnacH has a different reactivity.This is due to tBuNacnacH not reacting with the Grignard reagent shown above. Instead, it can be heated with dibutylmagnesium and become deprotonated.

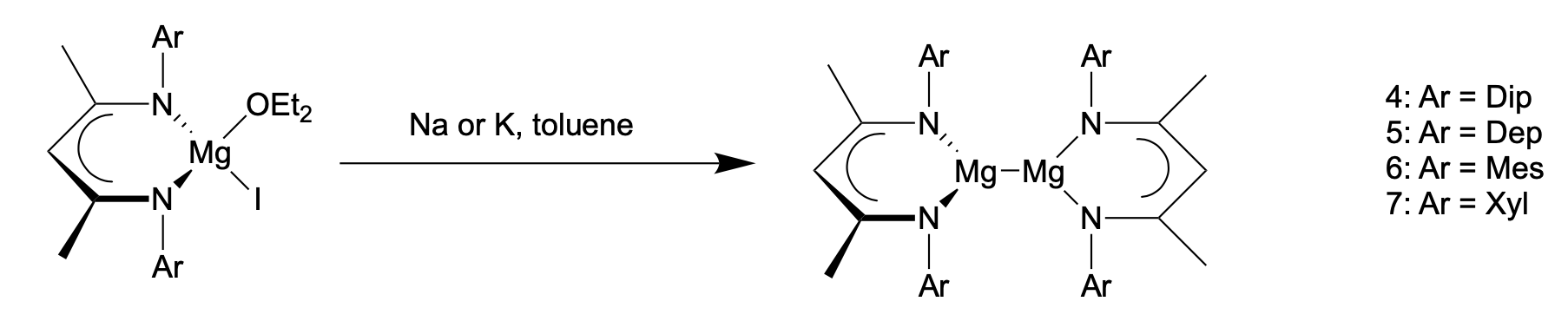
Successful synthesis of β -diketimine coordinated systems with respective group.

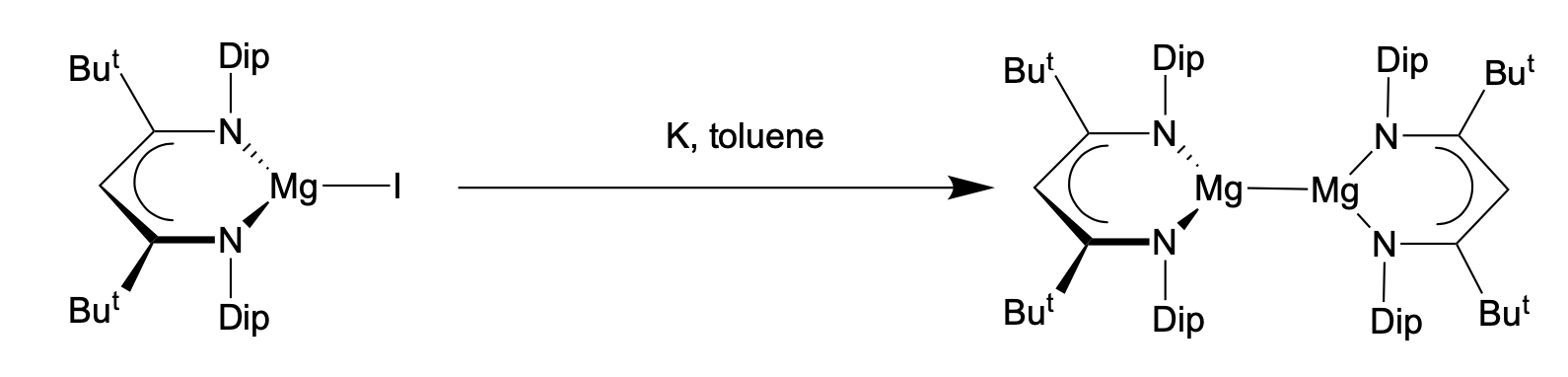
Successful synthesis [{(tBuNacnac)Mg}^{2}].

For the reactant, the was stabilized by utilizing a bulkier, or more sterically demanding, N-ligand. This reaction is carried out through potassium reduction of the α-diimine, ^{MeDip}DAB and Mg(II) chloride in tetrahydrofuran (THF). It can be noted that ^{MeDip}DAB can be shown by the chemical formula as [(DipNCMe)_{2}]). The shown Mg(I) complexes are all thermally stable. Some can even tolerate temperatures up to 300 °C. They also range in colors from colorless to orange. As these compounds are investigated further, the dimers have been found to be kinetically stabilized by multiple β-diketiminate derivatives, a guanidinate, a diiminophosphinate, an enediamide, and several diimine-enolates.

== Bond properties ==
The Mg(I) dimer formula, LMgMgL, has undergone multiple theoretical investigations regarding the bonds. Furthermore, L, a monoanionic ligand, can also include halides, hydrogen, small alkyl groups, aryl groups, cyclopentadienyl with respective derivatives and chelating monoanionic nitrogen ligands. Mg—Mg bonded molecules underwent the primary investigation, with the bond length found to be 2.76-2.89 Å. Additionally, the bond dissociation energy was found to be between 45 and 48 kcal mol^{−1}. Specifically, for ClMgMgCl, it was found to be 47.1 kcal mol^{−1}.

=== s and p-orbital overlap ===
The Mg-Mg bond for a neutral magnesium(I) dimer has shown to be significantly sigma-bonding. This arises from the s-orbital overlap of the two metals. The bonding interaction that occurs may be connected to the highest occupied molecular orbital (HOMO), giving the highest energy bond of the molecule. This can be reflected through the Wiberg Bond Index (WBI). The sigma single bond gives a WBI value of 0.9, having 90% s-character. Further theoretical investigations have proved that this does not hold for every complex. There can be notable p-orbital contribution to the Mg—Mg, with it being determined to be 55% in some complexes as the charge changes. There were also findings regarding the lowest unoccupied molecular orbital (LUMO). For example, bonding character was also discovered in nearly degenerate LUMO and LUMO+1, with a HOMO–LUMO gap of 93 kcal mol^{−1}.

== Potential applications ==
=== Mg(I) dimer benefits ===
Reducing agents can also be considered in demand as the rapid rise of low oxidation state chemistry has been reliant on them. Common compounds include but are not limited to potassium graphite (KC_{8}), sodium naphthalenide and its alkali derivatives, or s-block metals in their elemental form, such as lithium. However, these reducing agents can have drawbacks, especially concerning accessing low oxidation states. For instance, these complexes may not be soluble in certain solutions, may lack certain selectivity, or can have an over-reduction effect of the initial precursor. Additionally, other side reactions can occur. More importantly, corrosion can be considered. Pure magnesium can be employed as an example. As the humidity increases, the corrosion rate of pure magnesium increases. At 10% humidity, there is no corrosion; at 30% there is a small layer of surface oxide, with slight corrosion evident; at 80% an amorphous phase coats about 30% of the surface and shows significant corrosion. Instances like these concerning the disadvantages of reducing agents, can make the dimers more appealing to certain chemical synthesizes.

=== Mg(I) reagent potential for complexes ===
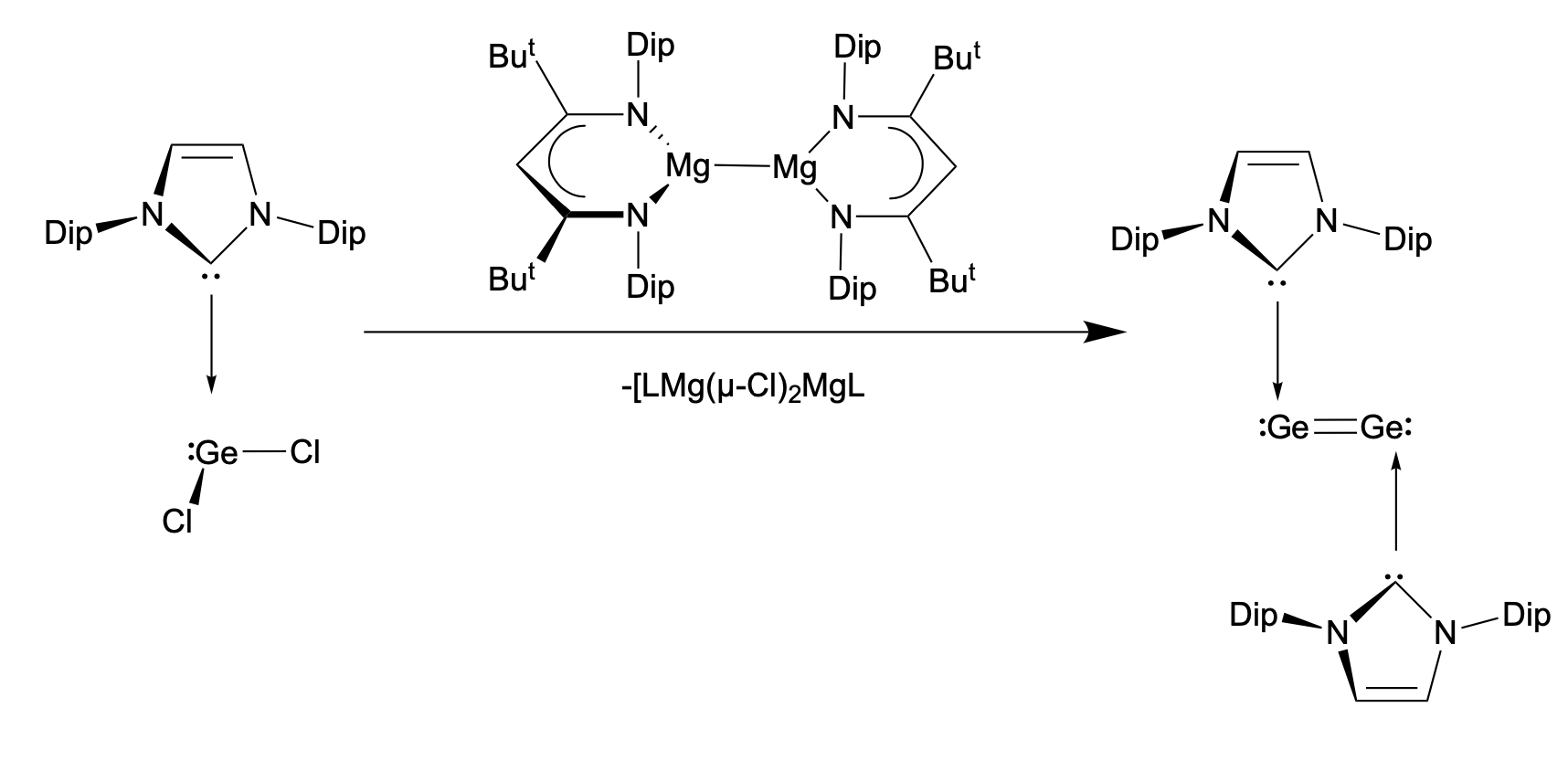
Ge double bond attained by using Mg(I) dimers.

Mg(I) dimers have the potential to be reducing agents that can be utilized in organic and organometallic synthesis. The thermal stability, moderate air and water sensitivity, and wide range of solubility in organic solvents may make the dimer attractive to chemists. An example of this can be shown through low oxidation state germanium (Ge) chemistry. Using Mg(I) dimers led to a Ge double bond. It can also be noted that the product had low yield. Additionally, the ligand, ^{Dip}Nacnac has poor solubility in the reaction solvent of ether. This allows for easy separation too.

Additionally, hydrogen storage has been gained significant research attention as an alternative to fossil fuels.

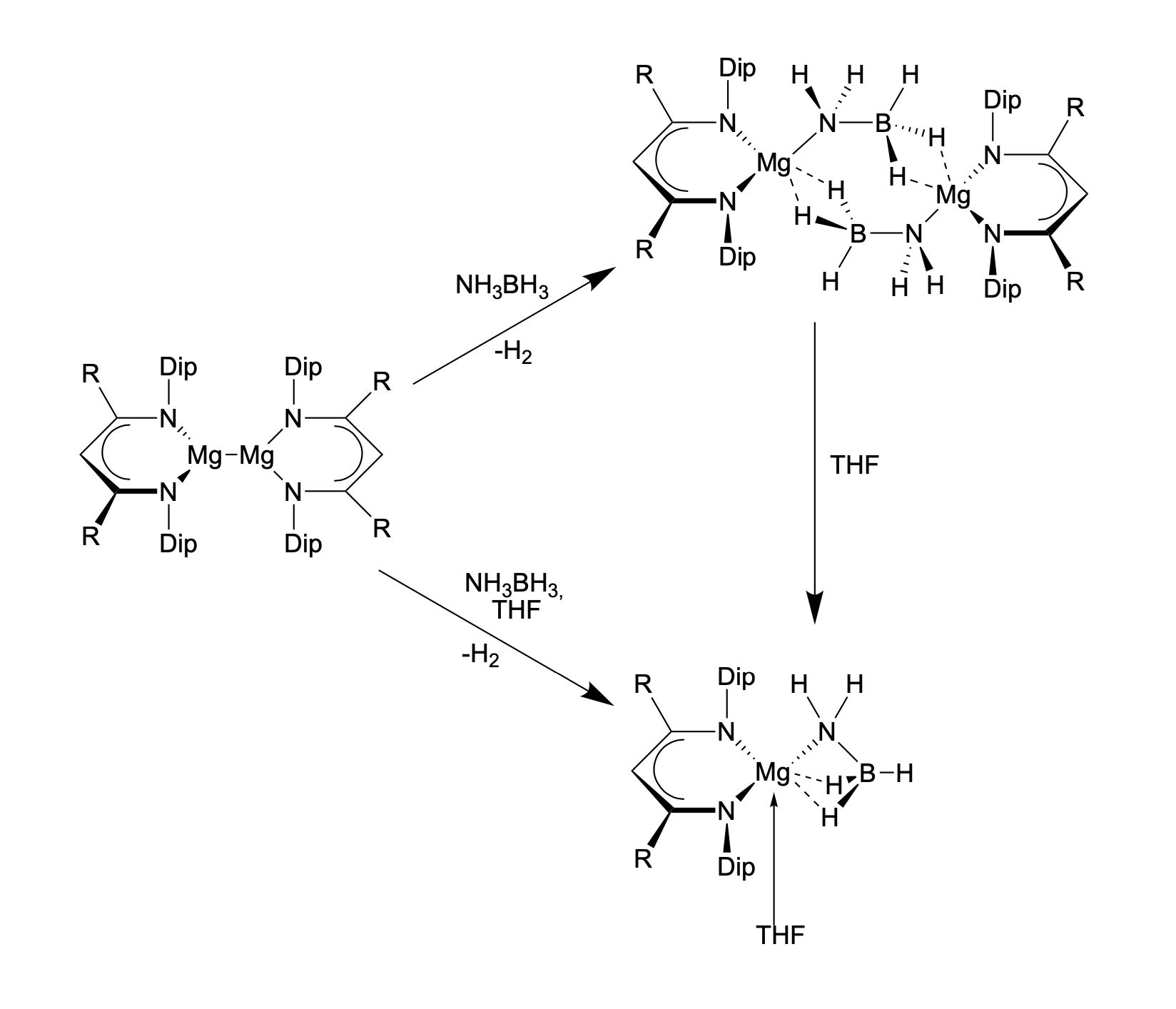
Reductive dehydrogenation of ammonia borane attained by Mg(I) dimers.

Ammonia borane, NH_{3}BH_{3}, has a high H-content, at 19.6%, concerning hydrogen storage material. However, there are issues regarding the safety, kinetics, and practical characteristics of the compound. Alternatively, more s-block amidoboranes have been researched as an alternative, with some interest lying in magnesium amidoborane. Some studies have shown that using reductive dehydrogenation of ammonia borane can be achieved using Mg(I) dimers.

=== Grignard reagent potential ===
Grignard reagents, given by RMgX, with R being a monoanionic organic substituent and X being a halide, are thought to proceed through some magnesium(I) intermediates, such as RMgMgX. It is believed that some of the transformations that occur with Grignard reagents may proceed via single electron transfer. This proceeds from the RMg to the substrate. Organic one electron reductions are also believed to be in equilibrium with a univalent magnesium compounds such as XMgMgX. This reagent could have potential to be more selective when compared to other reducing agents, such as samarium(II) Iodide, SmI_{2}, that also acts as a one electron reductant.

=== Carbon activation ===
Scheme given on the reaction capabilities with magnesium(I) dimers as a reactant.

Mg(I) dimers have also been researched for carbon monoxide, CO, activation. Further research regarding the synthesis of these complexes revealed that their behavior can be compared to low-valent f-blocks compounds concerning the reduction of CO_{2}, isocyanides, and nitriles.

Computational studies carried out further reinforced this idea by showing parallels between CO activation with f-block metal hydride complexes. The researchers first started with Mg(I) dimers. These dimers were then hydrogenated in hopes of generating magnesium(II) dimers. Additionally, the hydrogenation of Mg(I) dimers in a CO atmosphere, led to Cross-Coupled alkoxy products. The mechanism in which this reaction proceeded was shown by the computational studies to proceed similarly to related reactions of f-block metal hydride complexes. More specifically, researchers drew a close analogy to the reactivity of [{(DippNacnac)Mg}_{2}] towards CO_{2}. After the reaction was carried out, the dimer was shown to have a similar reactivity towards CO_{2} that could also be shown in samarium(II) or uranium(III) complexes. This reaction could also illustrate the potential magnesium(I) dimers have for the conversion of H_{2}/CO mixtures. By using more reactive dimers, it was hypothesized that uses for the stoichiometric or catalytic transformation of CO/H_{2} mixtures to value added oxygenate products. Finally, the similarity to low-valent f-block complexes can give rise to a more affordable, nontoxic, and nonradioactive practices. Comparatively, the diamagnetic dimer could also a difference in electronic properties when compared to paramagnetic nature of the lanthanides and actinides.
