= Double bond rule =

Chemistry rule of thumb

In chemistry, the double bond rule states that elements with a principal quantum number (n) greater than 2 for their valence electrons (period 3 elements and higher) tend not to form multiple bonds (e.g. double bonds and triple bonds). Double bonds for these heavier elements, when they exist, are often weak due to poor orbital overlap between the n>2 orbitals of the two atoms. Although such compounds are not intrinsically unstable, they instead tend to dimerize or even polymerize. Moreover, the multiple bonds of the elements with n=2 are much stronger than usual, because lone pair repulsion weakens their sigma bonding but not their pi bonding. An example is the rapid polymerization that occurs upon condensation of disulfur, the heavy analogue of O_{2}. Numerous exceptions to the rule exist.

Double bonds for carbon and nearest neighbours
	B boron (n=2)	C carbon (n=2)	N nitrogen (n=2)	O oxygen (n=2)	Si silicon (n=3)	P phosphorus (n=3)	S sulfur (n=3)
B	diborenes	alkylideneboranes	aminoboranylidenes, rare	oxoboranes, rare, rapid oligomerization	borasilenes (rare)	boranylidenephosphanes, rare, stable compounds are known	thioxoboranes, rare
C		alkenes	imines	carbonyls	silenes	phosphaalkenes	thioketones
N			azo compounds	nitroso compounds	silanimines, rare, easy oligomerization, observed only at low temp	phosphazene (P=N)	sulfilimines
O				Singlet oxygen	silanones, Si=O bonds extremely reactive, oligomerization to siloxanes	numerous, e.g. phosphine oxides, phosphonates, phosphinates, phosphates	numerous, e.g. sulfuric acid, sulfates, sulfoxides (R-S(=O)-R′, compounds with a sulfinyl group), and sulfones (R-S(=O)_{2}-R′, the sulfonyl group)
Si					disilenes	silylidenephosphanes a.k.a. phosphasilenes, rare	silanethiones, rare, easy oligomerization
P						diphosphenes	common compounds such as thiophosphates and phosphine sulfides, for example, triphenylphosphine sulfide and certain dithiadiphosphetanes
S							disulfur, thiosulfoxides

== Triple bonds ==
Triple bonds for carbon and nearest neighbours
	B boron (n=2)	C carbon (n=2)	N nitrogen (n=2)	O oxygen (n=2)	Si silicon (n=3)	P phosphorus (n=3)	S sulfur (n=3)	Ge germanium (n=4)	As arsenic (n=4)
B	diborynes	Borataalkynes have been observed	Observed in (t-Bu)BN(t-Bu) (an iminoborane)	oxoboranes					
C		alkynes	cyanides	Carbon monoxide (C≡O)	silynes	phosphaalkynes	Carbon monosulfide (C≡S)		arsaalkynes
N			Dinitrogen, Diazonium			Phosphorus mononitride (P≡N)			Arsa-diazonium
O					Silicon monoxide has some triple-bond character				
Si					disilynes				
P						Diphosphorus			
S							Observed in (I_{2})_{2}S^{2+}_{2}		
Ge								Digermyne	
As						Arsenic monophosphide (As≡P)			
