= C4H9Li =

The molecular formula C_{4}H_{9}Li (molar mass: 64.06 g/mol) may refer to:

- n-Butyllithium
- sec-Butyllithium
- tert-Butyllithium
