= Trapp mixture =

Low-melting mixture of organic solvents

The Trapp mixture is a specific mixture of organic solvents that allows chemical reactions to take place at very low temperatures. It is made up of THF:diethyl ether:pentane in a 4:4:1 ratio which remains liquid down to −110 °C and the same solvents in a 4:1:1 ratio remain a liquid down to −120 °C. This solvent system retains a low viscosity until just before freezing and it allows a lower temperature reaction than pure THF, which melts at −108.4 °C. An illustrative application of Trapp solvent is the preparation of vinyllithium by lithium halogen exchange from vinyl bromide and tert-butyllithium. The low temperatures suppress the reaction of the strongly basic organolithium reagent with the THF.
