= Butyllithium =

Butyllithium may refer to one of 5 isomeric organolithium reagents of which 3 are commonly used in chemical synthesis:

- n-Butyllithium, abbreviated BuLi or ^{n}BuLi
- sec-Butyllithium, abbreviated sec-BuLi or ^{s}BuLi, has 2 stereoisomers, but is commonly used as racemate
- tert-Butyllithium, abbreviated tert-BuLi or ^{t}BuLi
- Isobutyllithium
