= Dehalogenation =

Chemical reaction in which a carbon-halogen bond is cleaved

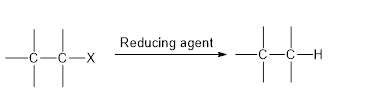
Scheme for dehalogenation reaction (R = alkyl or aryl group, X = I, Cl, Br, F)

In organic chemistry, dehalogenation is a set of chemical reactions that involve the cleavage of carbon-halogen bonds; as such, it is the inverse reaction of halogenation. Dehalogenations come in many varieties, including defluorination (removal of fluorine), dechlorination (removal of chlorine), debromination (removal of bromine), and deiodination (removal of iodine). Incentives to investigate dehalogenations include both constructive and destructive goals. Complicated organic compounds such as pharmaceutical drugs are occasionally generated by dehalogenation. Many organohalides are hazardous, so their dehalogenation is one route for their detoxification.

== Mechanistic and thermodynamic concepts ==
Removal of a halogen atom from an organohalide generates a radical. Such reactions are difficult to achieve and, when they can be achieved, these processes often lead to complicated mixtures. When a pair of halides are mutually adjacent (vicinal), their removal is favored. Such reactions give alkenes in the case of vicinal alkyl dihalides:

R_{2}C(X)C(X)R_{2} + M → R_{2}C=CR_{2} + MX_{2}

Most desirable from the perspective of remediation are dehalogenations by hydrogenolysis, i.e. the replacement of a C−X bond by a C−H bond. Such reactions are amenable to catalysis:

R−X + H_{2} → R−H + HX

The rate of dehalogenation depends on the strength of the bond between the carbon and halogen atom. The bond dissociation energies of carbon-halogen bonds are described as: H_{3}C−I (234 kJ/mol), H_{3}C−Br (293 kJ/mol), H_{3}C−Cl (351 kJ/mol), and H_{3}C−F (452 kJ/mol). Thus, for the same structures the bond dissociation rate for dehalogenation will be: F < Cl < Br < I. Additionally, the rate of dehalogenation for alkyl halide also varies with steric environment and follows this trend: primary > secondary > tertiary halides.

== Applications ==
Since organochlorine compounds are the most abundant organohalides, most dehalogenations entail manipulation of C-Cl bonds.

=== Organic synthesis ===
Of some interest in organic synthesis, electropositive metals react with many organic halides in a metal-halogen exchange:

RX + 2 M → RM + MX

The resulting organometallic compound is susceptible to hydrolysis:

RM + H_{2}O → RH + MOH

Heavily studied examples are found in organolithium chemistry and organomagnesium chemistry. Some illustrative cases follow.

Lithium-halogen exchange is essentially irrelevant to remediation, but the method is useful for fine chemical synthesis. Sodium metal has been used for dehalogenation process. Removal of halogen atom from arene-halides in the presence of Grignard agent and water for the formation of new compound is known as Grignard degradation. Dehalogenation using Grignard reagents is a two steps hydrodehalogenation process. The reaction begins with the formation of alkyl/arene-magnesium-halogen compound, followed by addition of proton source to form dehalogenated product. Egorov and his co-workers have reported dehalogenation of benzyl halides using atomic magnesium in 3P state at 600 °C. Toluene and bi-benzyls were produced as the product of the reaction. Morrison and his co-workers also reported dehalogenation of organic halides by flash vacuum pyrolysis using magnesium.

=== With transition metal complexes ===
Many low-valent and electron-rich transition metals effect stoichiometric dehalogenation. The reaction achieves practical interest in the context of organic synthesis, e.g. Cu-promoted Ullmann coupling.

The reaction is mainly conducted as stoichiometrically. Some metalloenzymes Vitamin B12 and coenzyme F430 are capable of dehalogenations catalytically. Of great interest are hydrodehalogenations, especially for chlorinated precursors:

R−Cl + H_{2} → R−H + HCl

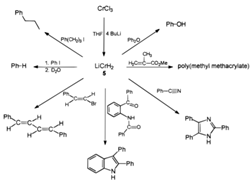
Dehalogenation using lithium chromium(I) dihydride

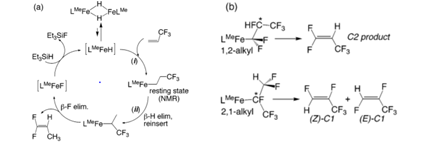
Hydrodefluorination of fluorinated alkenes
