= Vinyllithium =

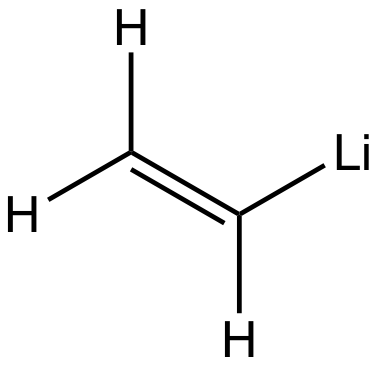

Identifiers
CAS Number	917-57-7
3D model (JSmol)	Interactive image
Beilstein Reference	3587231
ChEBI	CHEBI:51472
ChemSpider	10254403
ECHA InfoCard	100.011.844
EC Number	213-028-5
Gmelin Reference	723
PubChem CID	637931
CompTox Dashboard (EPA)	DTXSID10238670
- InChI: InChI=1S/C2H3.Li/c1-2;/h1H,2H2; Key: PGOLTJPQCISRTO-UHFFFAOYSA-N
- SMILES: [Li]C=C

Properties
Chemical formula	C_{2}H_{3}Li
Molar mass	33.99 g·mol^{−1}
Appearance	white solid

Hazards
- Occupational safety and health (OHS/OSH)
Main hazards	pyrophoric
- Except where otherwise noted, data are given for materials in their standard state (at 25 °C [77 °F], 100 kPa). Infobox references

Vinyllithium is an organolithium compound with the formula LiC_{2}H_{3}. A colorless or white solid, it is encountered mainly as a solution in tetrahydrofuran (THF). It is a reagent in synthesis of organic compounds, especially for vinylations.

== Preparation and structure ==
Solutions of vinyllithium are prepared by lithium-halogen exchange reactions. A halide-free route entails reaction of tetravinyltin with butyllithium:

Sn(CH=CH_{2})_{4} + 4 BuLi → SnBu_{4} + 4 LiCH=CH_{2}

The reaction of ethylene and lithium affords vinyl lithium and lithium hydride, together with other organolithium compounds,

Like most organolithium compounds, vinyllithium crystallizes from THF as a cluster compound as a cubane-type cluster.

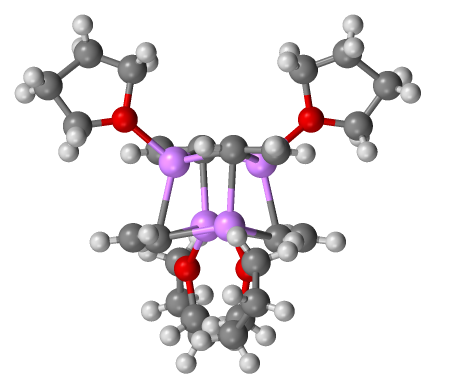
Structure of [LiC_{2}H_{3}(THF)]_{4}.

== Reactions ==
Vinyllithium is used to install vinyl groups on metal-based reagents, i.e., vinylations. It is a precursor to vinylsilanes, vinylcuprates, and vinylstannanes. It adds to ketones compounds to give allylic alcohols. Vinylmagnesium bromide is often used in place of vinyllithium.

== Alternative reagents ==
Vinyl magnesium bromide, a Grignard reagent, is in many ways easier to generate in the laboratory and behaves similarly to vinyllithium.
