= Sheri Sangji case =

Legal action resulting from an academic laboratory accident

The Sheri Sangji case is the first criminal case resulting from an academic laboratory accident.

The case arose from a fatal accident that occurred in the chemistry laboratory of Patrick Harran at the University of California, Los Angeles (UCLA). Research assistant Sheharbano "Sheri" Sangji suffered severe burns from a fire that occurred on December 29, 2008, when a plastic syringe she was using to transfer the pyrophoric reagent tert-butyllithium from one sealed container to another came apart, spilling the chemical, and igniting a fire. Sangji was not wearing a protective lab coat and her clothing caught fire, resulting in severe burns that led to her death 18 days later.

An investigation was conducted by the California Occupational Safety and Health Administration (Cal/OSHA), which protects the public and workers from safety hazards and enforces the U.S. State of California's occupational and public safety laws.

In 2009, Cal/OSHA fined UCLA $31,875 for violations relating to the fire and in 2012, the Los Angeles District Attorney filed four felony charges against the Regents of the University of California and Patrick Harran for "willful violation of safety regulations". However, prosecutors reached a deferred prosecution agreement after Harran agreed to pay a donation to a local burn center and do community service. On September 6, 2018, the court announced that Harran had fulfilled the terms of the agreement, and dismissed the charges against him.

Sangji's death and Harran's legal proceedings have led to a significant increase in the safety standards of research laboratories in academic settings.

Sangji's family was unhappy with the terms of the settlement with Harran. Sangji's sister, Naveen, remarked "[t]his settlement, like the previous one with UCLA, is barely a slap on the wrist for the responsible individual." She noted that previous safety violations in his lab were not corrected before her sister's death and that UCLA had ignored the "wake-up calls" of earlier accidents in other labs. She decried the nearly $4.5 million in legal fees the public university spent defending itself and Harran.
