= Patrick Harran =

American organic chemist

Patrick Harran (born 13 July 1969) is an American organic chemist who has held the D. J. & J. M. Cram Chair in Organic Chemistry, an endowed chair at the University of California, Los Angeles, since 2008. Prior to taking this position he was a professor at the University of Texas Southwestern Medical Center. Harran was educated at Skidmore College graduating in 1990. He went on to Yale University, where he was awarded a Ph.D. in 1995.

In 2009, a research assistant in his lab, Sheri Sangji, died from burn injuries after a chemical fire. A California Division of Occupational Safety and Health report faulted Harran for willfully neglecting safety protocols. He was charged with four felony counts in the first criminal case stemming from a laboratory accident in U.S. history, but avoided jailtime through a plea deal with prosecutors, which was finalized in 2018. In 2015, the AAAS Chemistry Section nominated, but then did not proceed with the nomination of Harran for AAAS Fellow, after concerns about the Sangji case were raised by the ACS Committee on Chemical Safety.

== Research ==
Harran's research is focused on the total synthesis of natural products, design of novel chemical compounds to study protein–protein interactions, and medicinal chemistry.

== Awards and honors ==
Sources:

- J. Clarence Karcher Medal, University of Oklahoma, 17 March 2017
- Hanson-Dow Award for Excellence in Teaching, 2013
- Glenn T. Seaborg Award - Alpha Chi Sigma, 2009
- Norman Hackerman Prize of the Robert A. Welch Foundation, 2007
- E. Bright Wilson Prize - Harvard University, 2005
- Merck Research Laboratories Chemistry Council Award, 2005-2007
- Mar Nell and F. Andrew Bell Distinguished Chair, 2005
- Pfizer Award for Creativity in Organic Synthesis, 2003
- Distinguished Alumni Award, Skidmore College, 2003
- Eli Lilly Grantee, 2003-2004
- AstraZeneca Excellence in Chemistry Award, 2002
- Alfred P. Sloan Research Fellow, 2002-2004
- National Science Foundation CAREER Award, 2000-2004
- National Research Service Award, Stanford University, 1995-1997
- Bristol-Myers Squibb Research Fellow, Yale University, 1993
- American Institute of Chemists Award, Skidmore College, 1990
- Highest Departmental Honors in Chemistry, Skidmore College, 1990
- One Year Advanced Admission, Skidmore College, 1986

== Laboratory fire ==
On December 29, 2008, a fire in Harran's UCLA laboratory fatally burned research assistant Sheri Sangji. Harran in 2011 was charged with four felony counts of willfully violating occupational safety standards in the case, carrying a maximum jail term of 4.5 years. It was the first time any American academic had been criminally charged for a laboratory accident. Representatives of Harran, and the university's Board of Regents who were also charged in the incident, disputed the charges.

Harran and prosecutors in 2014 reached a deferred prosecution agreement in which Harran was ordered to pay $10,000 to a local burn center and do 800 hours of community service. Deputy District Attorney Craig W. Hum said that the penalty was similar to any sentence Harran would have received if convicted, while Sangji's family criticized it as "barely a slap on the wrist". The charges were subsequently dropped in 2018, in accordance with the settlement terms.
