= Tetravinyltin =

Chemical compound

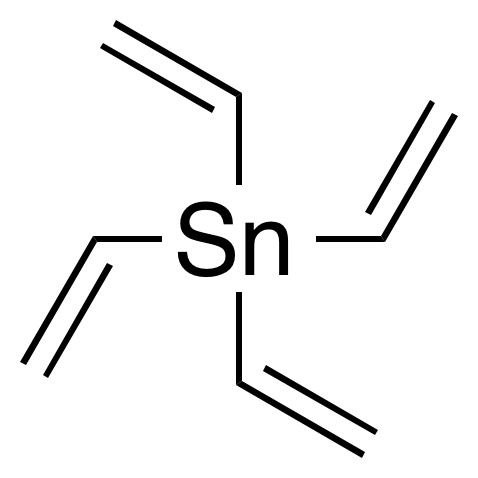

Names
- IUPAC name tetrakis(ethenyl)stannane
- Other names tetravinylstannane

Identifiers
CAS Number	1112-56-7
3D model (JSmol)	Interactive image
ChemSpider	25939952
ECHA InfoCard	100.012.903
EC Number	214-193-6
PubChem CID	66189
CompTox Dashboard (EPA)	DTXSID7074450
- InChI: InChI=1S/4C2H3.Sn/c4*1-2;/h4*1H,2H2; Key: MZIYQMVHASXABC-UHFFFAOYSA-N
- SMILES: C=C[Sn](C=C)(C=C)C=C

Properties
Chemical formula	C_{8}H_{12}Sn
Molar mass	226.894 g·mol^{−1}
Appearance	Colorless liquid
Density	1.246 g/mL
Boiling point	160–163 °C (320–325 °F; 433–436 K)

Hazards
- Occupational safety and health (OHS/OSH)
Main hazards	Flammable, Toxic
- GHS labelling
Pictograms	(GHS02: Flammable) (GHS06: Toxic)
Signal word	Danger
Hazard statements	H226, H301, H311, H331
Precautionary statements	P210, P233, P240, P241, P242, P243, P261, P264, P270, P271, P280, P301+P310, P302+P352, P303+P361+P353, P304+P340, P311, P312, P321, P322, P330, P361, P363, P370+P378, P403+P233, P403+P235, P405, P501
Flash point	105 °F
- Safety data sheet (SDS)
- Except where otherwise noted, data are given for materials in their standard state (at 25 °C [77 °F], 100 kPa). (what is ?) Infobox references

Tetravinyltin (also known as tetravinylstannane) is an organotin compound with a chemical formula of C_{8}H_{12}Sn.

== Uses ==
Upon heating, a mixture of tetravinyltin and tin tetrachloride undergo disproportionation to form divinyltin dichloride, vinyltin trichloride, and trivinyltin chloride in high yields. A study about this can be found in the Journal of American Chemical Society.

Tetravinyltin cannot be used for therapeutic or diagnostic purposes and must only be used for research. It can also be used for thin film deposition.

== Hazards ==
According to the European Chemicals Agency, tetravinyltin is flammable in liquid and gas form. It is also toxic when in contact with skin, inhaled, and swallowed. Therefore, personal protective equipment must be used in handling and proper caution applied during use.
