= Sec-Butyllithium =

sec-Butyllithium
- Skeletal formula of sec-butyllithium

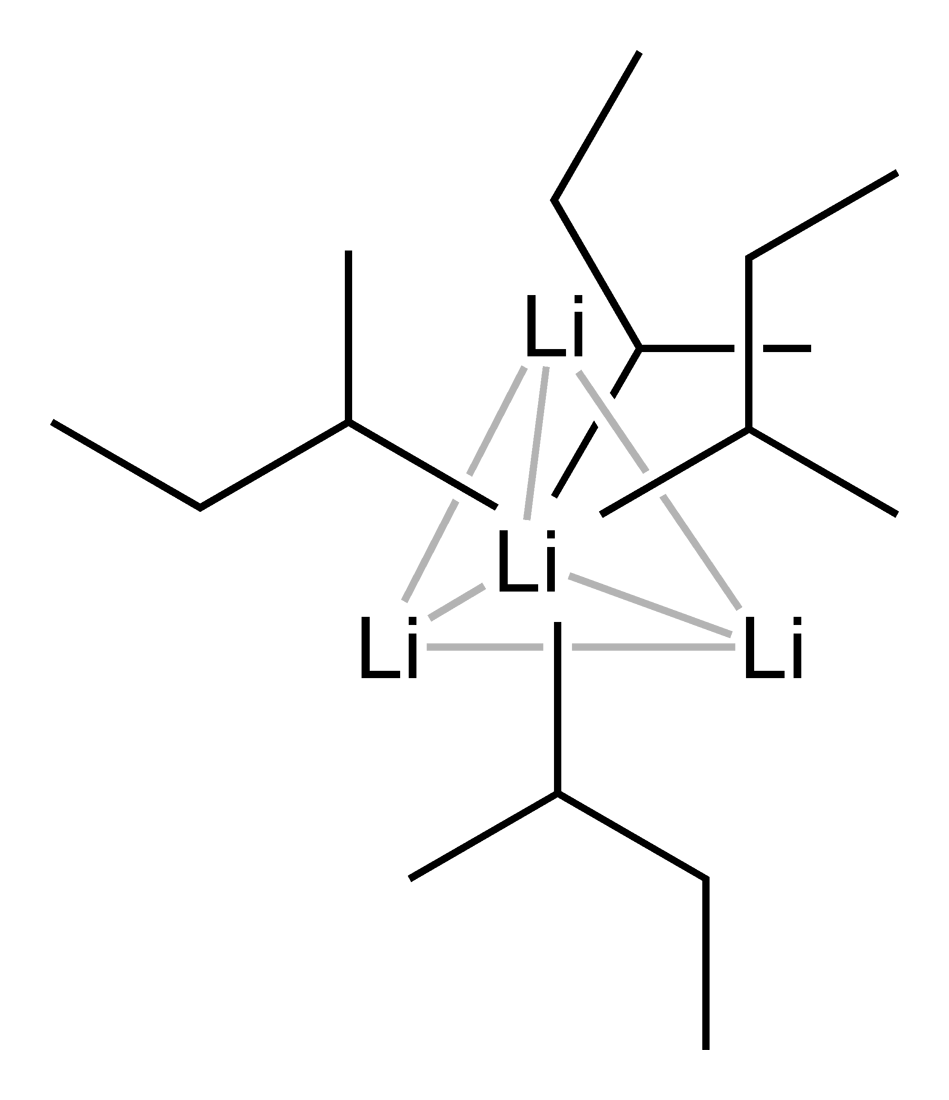
- Skeletal formula of tetrameric sec-butyllithium

Names
- IUPAC name sec-Butyllithium
- Systematic IUPAC name Butan-2-yllithium

Identifiers
CAS Number	598-30-1
3D model (JSmol)	Interactive image; Interactive image
Abbreviations	SBL s-BuLi sBuLi^{s}BuLi
Beilstein Reference	3587206
ChemSpider	10254345
ECHA InfoCard	100.009.026
EC Number	209-927-7
PubChem CID	102446
UNII	5YV3GII1TB
CompTox Dashboard (EPA)	DTXSID80883459
- InChI: InChI=1S/C4H9.Li/c1-3-4-2;/h3H,4H2,1-2H3; Key: VATDYQWILMGLEW-UHFFFAOYSA-N; InChI=1/C4H9.Li/c1-3-4-2;/h3H,4H2,1-2H3;/rC4H9Li/c1-3-4(2)5/h4H,3H2,1-2H3 Key: VATDYQWILMGLEW-MHILWDCKAX
- SMILES: [Li]C(C)CC; CC([Li])CC

Properties
Chemical formula	C_{4}H_{9}Li
Molar mass	64.06 g·mol^{−1}
Solubility in water	Reacts
Acidity (pK_{a})	51

Hazards
- GHS labelling
Pictograms	(GHS02: Flammable) (GHS05: Corrosive)
Signal word	Danger
Hazard statements	H250, H260, H314
Precautionary statements	P210, P222, P223, P231, P231+P232, P233, P260, P264, P264+P265, P280, P301+P330+P331, P302+P335+P334, P302+P361+P354, P304+P340, P305+P354+P338, P316, P317, P321, P363, P370+P378, P402+P404, P405, P501
Safety data sheet (SDS)	Fisher MSDS

Related compounds
Related organolithium reagents	n-butyllithium tert-butyllithium
- Except where otherwise noted, data are given for materials in their standard state (at 25 °C [77 °F], 100 kPa). verify (what is ?) Infobox references

sec-Butyllithium is an organometallic compound with the formula CH_{3}CHLiCH_{2}CH_{3}, abbreviated sec-BuLi or s-BuLi. This chiral organolithium reagent is used as a source of sec-butyl carbanion in organic synthesis.

== Synthesis ==
sec-BuLi can be prepared by the reaction of sec-butyl halides with lithium metal:

== Properties ==
=== Physical properties ===
sec-Butyllithium is a colorless viscous liquid. Using mass spectrometry, it was determined that the pure compound has a tetrameric structure. It also exists as tetramers when dissolved in organic solvents such as benzene, cyclohexane or cyclopentane. The cyclopentane solution has been detected with ^{6}Li-NMR spectroscopy to have a hexameric structure at temperatures below −41 °C. In electron-donating solvents such as tetrahydrofuran, there exists an equilibrium between monomeric and dimeric forms.

=== Chemical properties ===
The carbon-lithium bond is highly polar, rendering the carbon basic, as in other organolithium reagents. Sec-butyllithium is more basic than the primary organolithium reagent, n-butyllithium. It is also more sterically hindered. sec-BuLi is employed for deprotonations of particularly weak carbon acids where the more conventional reagent n-BuLi is unsatisfactory. It is, however, so basic that its use requires greater care than for n-BuLi. For example diethyl ether is attacked by sec-BuLi at room temperature in minutes, whereas ether solutions of n-BuLi are stable.

The compound decomposes slowly at room temperature and more rapidly at higher temperatures, giving lithium hydride and a mixture of butenes.

== Applications ==
Many transformations involving sec-butyllithium are similar to those involving other organolithium reagents.

In combination with sparteine as a chiral auxiliary, sec-butyllithium is useful in enantioselective deprotonations. It is also effective for lithiation of arenes.
