= Tert-Butyllithium =

tert-Butyllithium

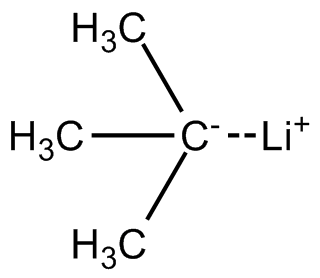
- Skeletal formula of tert-butyllithium with all implicit hydrogens shown, and partial charges added

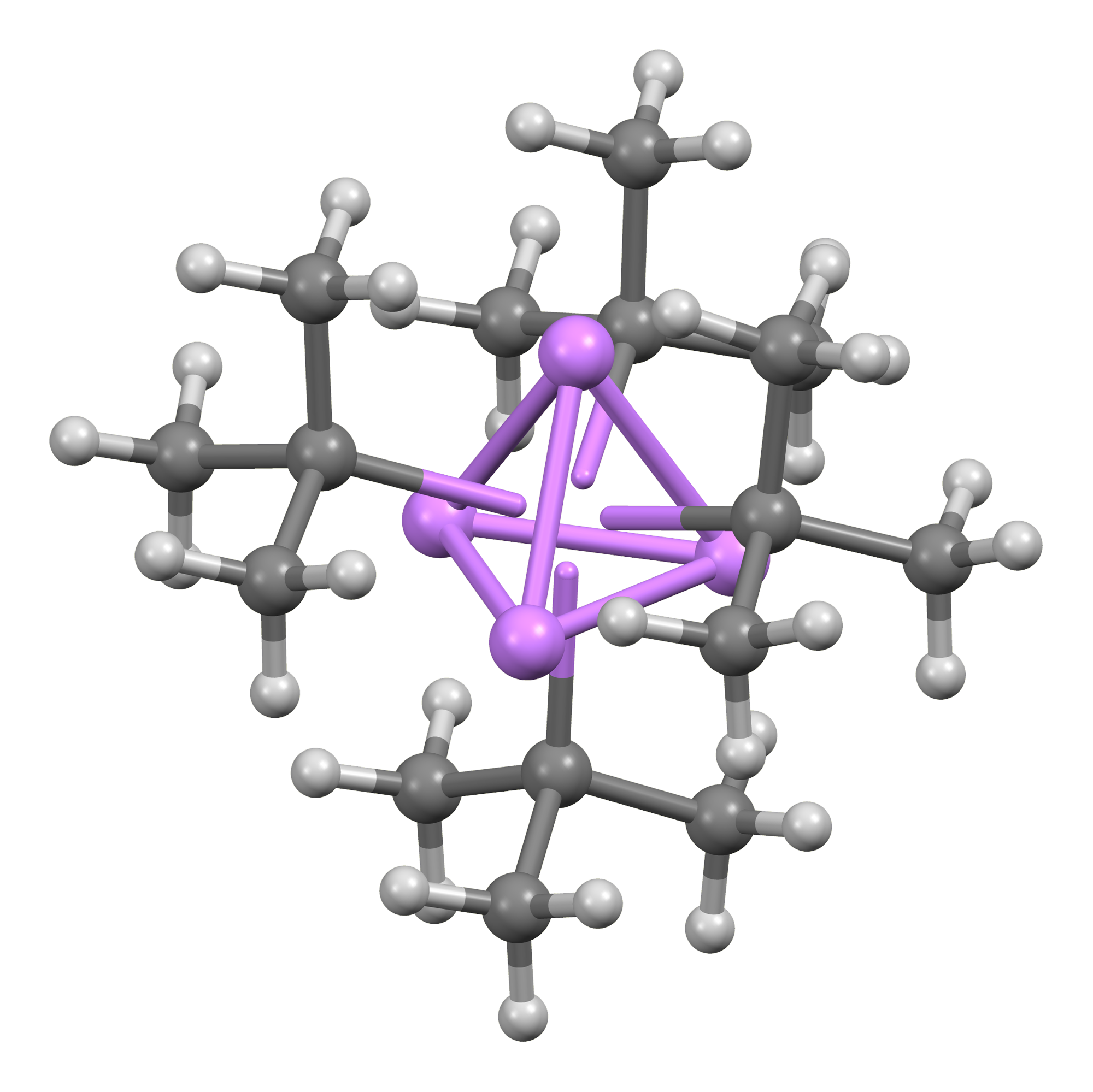

Names
- Preferred IUPAC name tert-Butyllithium

Identifiers
CAS Number	594-19-4
3D model (JSmol)	Interactive image
Abbreviations	TBL; Me_{3}CLi t-BuLi tBuLi^{t}BuLi
Beilstein Reference	3587204
ChemSpider	10254347
ECHA InfoCard	100.008.939
EC Number	209-831-5
PubChem CID	638178
UN number	3394
CompTox Dashboard (EPA)	DTXSID60883457
- InChI: InChI=1S/C4H9.Li/c1-4(2)3;/h1-3H3; Key: BKDLGMUIXWPYGD-UHFFFAOYSA-N
- SMILES: [Li]C(C)(C)C

Properties
Chemical formula	C_{4}H_{9}Li
Molar mass	64.06 g·mol^{−1}
Appearance	Colorless solid
Density	660 mg cm^{−3}
Boiling point	36 to 40 °C (97 to 104 °F; 309 to 313 K)
Solubility in water	Reacts
Acidity (pK_{a})	45–53

Hazards
- GHS labelling
Pictograms	(GHS02: Flammable) (GHS05: Corrosive) (GHS07: Exclamation mark) (GHS08: Health hazard) (GHS09: Environmental hazard)
Signal word	Danger
Hazard statements	H225, H250, H260, H300, H304, H310, H314, H330, H336, H411
Precautionary statements	P210, P222, P223, P231+P232, P370+P378, P422
NFPA 704 (fire diamond)	4 4 4 W
Flash point	−6.6 °C (20.1 °F; 266.5 K)

Related compounds
Related compounds	n-Butyllithium sec-Butyllithium
- Except where otherwise noted, data are given for materials in their standard state (at 25 °C [77 °F], 100 kPa). verify (what is ?) Infobox references

tert-Butyllithium is a chemical compound with the formula (CH_{3})_{3}CLi. As an organolithium compound, it has applications in organic synthesis since it is a strong base, capable of deprotonating many carbon molecules, including benzene. tert-Butyllithium is available commercially as solutions in hydrocarbons (such as pentane); it is not usually prepared in the laboratory.

== Preparation ==
tert-Butyllithium is produced commercially by treating tert-butyl chloride with lithium. Its synthesis was first reported by R. B. Woodward in 1941.

== Structure and bonding ==
Like other organolithium compounds, tert-butyllithium is a cluster compound. Whereas n-butyllithium exists both as a hexamer and a tetramer, tert-butyllithium exists exclusively as a tetramer with a cubane structure. Bonding in organolithium clusters involves sigma delocalization and significant Li−Li bonding. Despite its complicated structure, tert-butyllithium is usually depicted in equations as a monomer.

The lithium–carbon bond in tert-butyllithium is highly polarized, having about 40 percent ionic character. The molecule reacts like a carbanion, as is represented by these two resonance structures:

== Reactions ==
tert-Butyllithium is renowned for deprotonation of carbon acids (C-H bonds). One example is the double deprotonation of allyl alcohol. Other examples are the deprotonation of vinyl ethers.

In combination with n-butyllithium, tert-butyllithium monolithiates ferrocene. tert-Butyllithium deprotonates dichloromethane:

H_{2}CCl_{2} + RLi → HCCl_{2}Li + RH

Similar to n-butyllithium, tert-butyllithium can be used for lithium–halogen exchange reactions.

=== Solvent compatibility ===
To minimize degradation by solvents, reactions involving tert-butyllithium are often conducted at very low temperatures in special solvents, such as the Trapp solvent mixture.

More so than other alkyllithium compounds, tert-butyllithium reacts with ethers. In diethyl ether, the half-life of tert-butyllithium is about 60 minutes at 0 °C. It is even more reactive toward tetrahydrofuran (THF); the half-life in THF solutions is about 40 minutes at −20 °C. In dimethoxyethane, the half-life is about 11 minutes at −70 °C.

In this example, the reaction of tert-butyllithium with (THF) is shown:

== Safety ==
tert-butyllithium is a pyrophoric substance, meaning that it spontaneously ignites on exposure to air. Air-free techniques are important so as to prevent this compound from reacting violently with oxygen and moisture:

t-BuLi + O_{2} → t-BuOOLi
t-BuLi + H_{2}O → t-BuH + LiOH

The solvents used in common commercial preparations are themselves flammable. While it is possible to work with this compound using cannula transfer, traces of tert-butyllithium at the tip of the needle or cannula may ignite and clog the cannula with lithium salts. While some researchers take this "pilot light" effect as a sign that the product is "fresh" and has not degraded due to time or improper storage/handling, others prefer to enclose the needle tip or cannula in a short glass tube, which is flushed with an inert gas and sealed at each end with septa. Serious laboratory accidents involving tert-butyllithium have occurred. For example, in 2008 a staff research assistant, Sheharbano Sangji, in the lab of Patrick Harran at the University of California, Los Angeles, died after being severely burned by a fire ignited by tert-butyllithium.

Large-scale reactions may lead to runaway reactions, fires, and explosions when tert-butyllithium is mixed with ethers such as diethyl ether, and tetrahydrofuran. The use of hydrocarbon solvents may be preferred.

== See also ==
- Sheri Sangji case
