= N-Butyllithium =

Chemical compound

n-Butyllithium
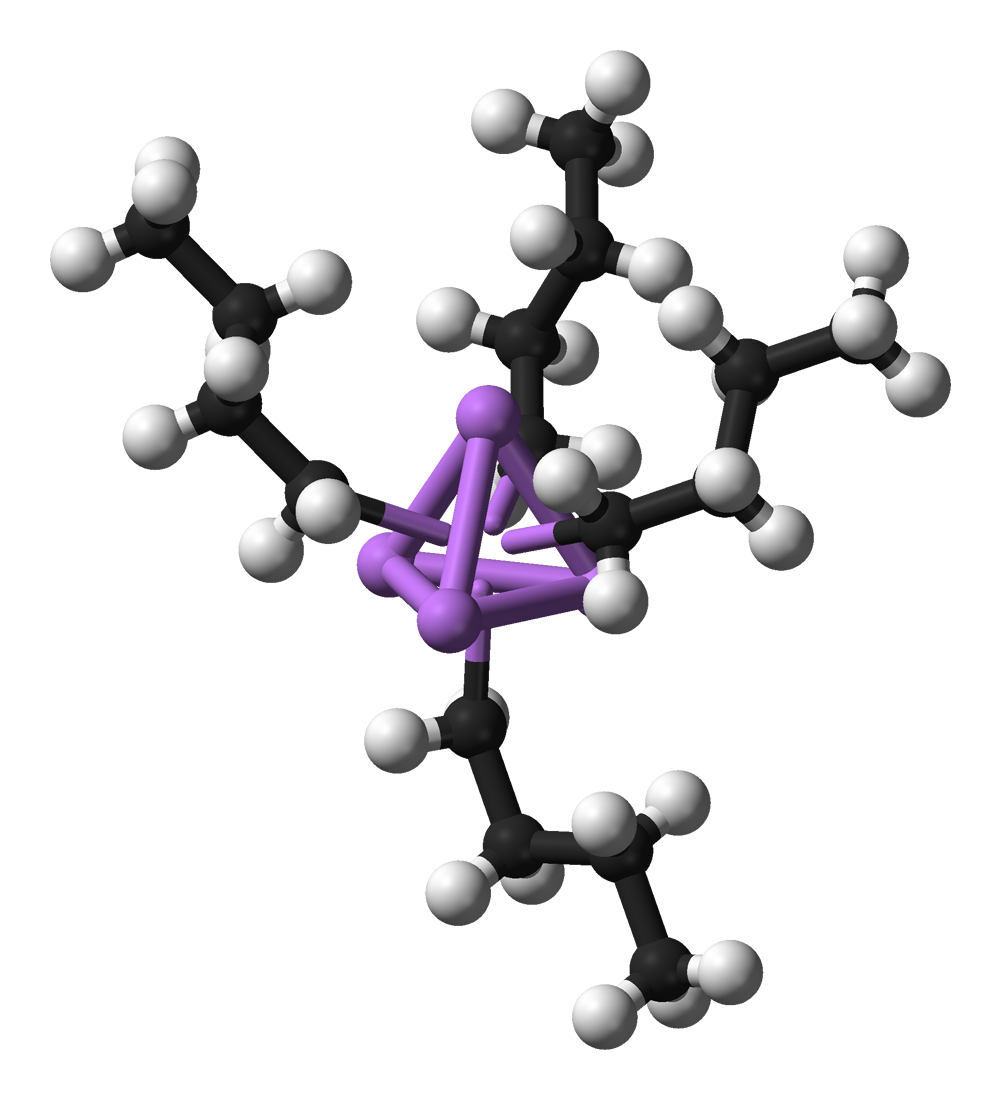
n-Butyllithium tetramer
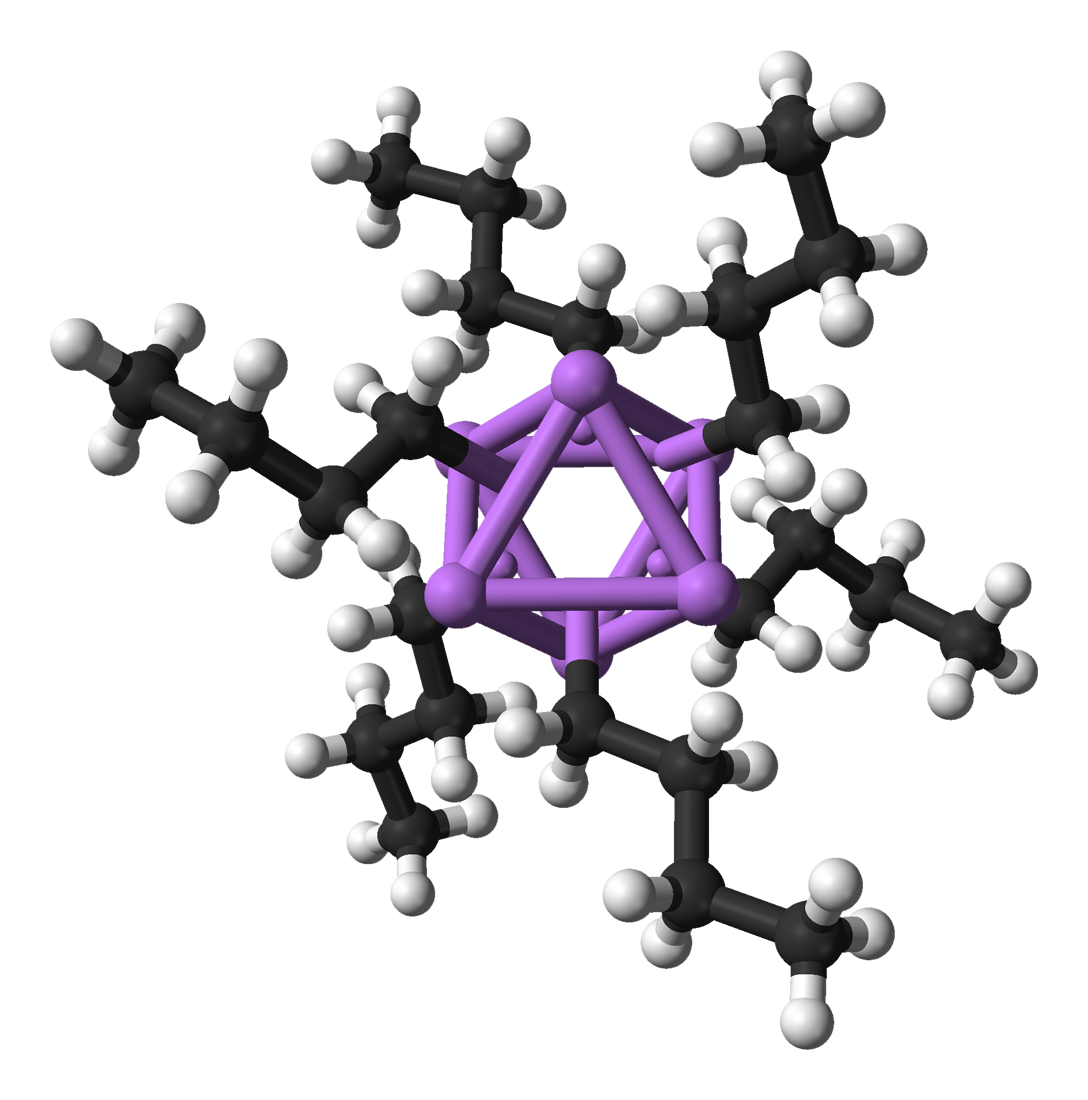
n-Butyllithium hexamer
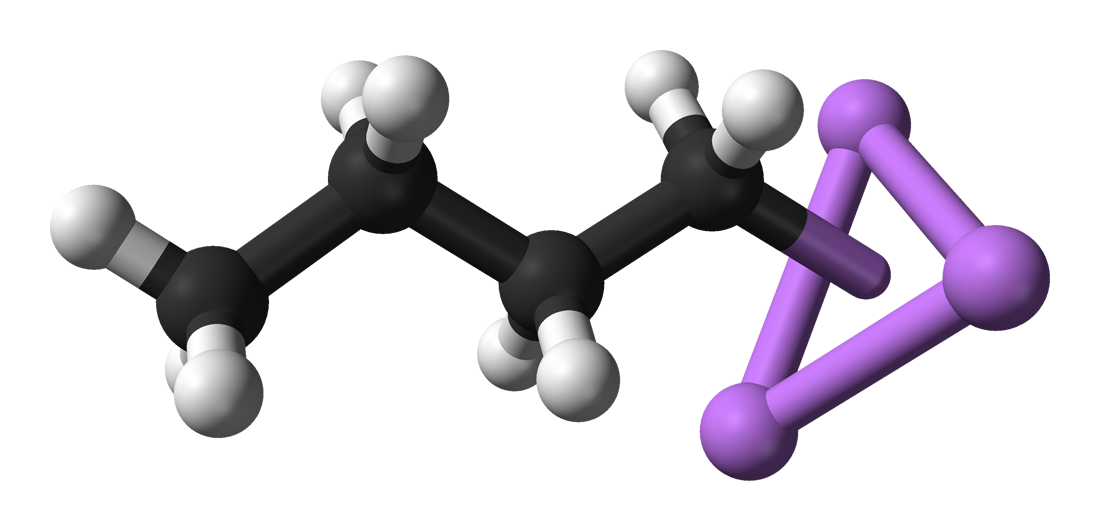
- Close-up of the delocalized bonds between butyl and lithium

Names
- IUPAC name butyllithium, tetra-μ_{3}-butyl-tetralithium
- Other names 1-lithiobutane

Identifiers
CAS Number	109-72-8
3D model (JSmol)	Interactive image
Abbreviations	BL; NBL; BuLi n-BuLi nBuLi^{n}BuLi
ChEBI	CHEBI:51469
ChemSpider	10254339
ECHA InfoCard	100.003.363
PubChem CID	61028
UNII	09W9A6B8ZC
CompTox Dashboard (EPA)	DTXSID1026821
- InChI: InChI=1S/C4H9.Li/c1-3-4-2;/h1,3-4H2,2H3; Key: MZRVEZGGRBJDDB-UHFFFAOYSA-N; InChI=1/C4H9.Li/c1-3-4-2;/h1,3-4H2,2H3;/rC4H9Li/c1-2-3-4-5/h2-4H2,1H3 Key: MZRVEZGGRBJDDB-NESCHKHYAE
- SMILES: CCCC[Li]

Properties
Chemical formula	C_{4}H_{9}Li
Molar mass	64.06 g·mol^{−1}
Appearance	colorless liquid unstable usually obtained as solution
Density	0.68 g/cm^{3}, solvent defined
Melting point	−76 °C (−105 °F; 197 K) (<273 K)
Boiling point	80 C
Solubility in water	Exothermic decomposition
Solubility	Ethers such as THF, hydrocarbons
Acidity (pK_{a})	50 (of the conjugate acid)

Structure
Molecular shape	tetrameric in solution
Dipole moment	0 D

Hazards
- Occupational safety and health (OHS/OSH)
Main hazards	Pyrophoric (spontaneously combusts in air), decomposes to corrosive LiOH
NFPA 704 (fire diamond)	3 4 3 W

Related compounds
Related organolithium reagents	sec-butyllithium tert-butyllithium hexyllithium methyllithium
Related compounds	lithium hydroxide
- Except where otherwise noted, data are given for materials in their standard state (at 25 °C [77 °F], 100 kPa). verify (what is ?) Infobox references

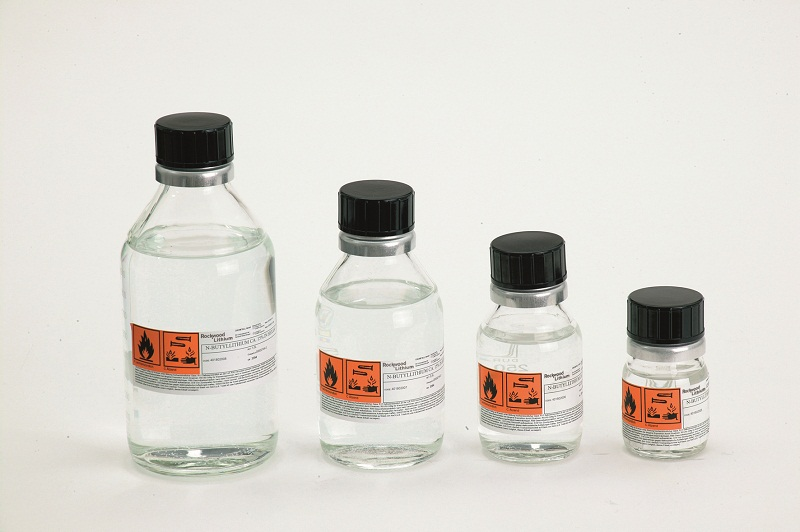
Glass bottles containing butyllithium

n-Butyllithium C_{4}H_{9}Li (abbreviated n-BuLi) is an organolithium reagent. It is widely used as a polymerization initiator in the production of elastomers such as polybutadiene or styrene-butadiene-styrene (SBS). Also, it is broadly employed as a strong base (superbase) in the synthesis of organic compounds, such as in the pharmaceutical industry.

Butyllithium is commercially available as solutions (15%, 25%, 1.5 M, 2 M, 2.5 M, 10 M, etc.) in alkanes such as pentane, hexanes, and heptanes. Solutions in diethyl ether and THF can be prepared, but are not stable enough for storage. Annual worldwide production and consumption of butyllithium and other organolithium compounds is estimated at 2000 to 3000 tonnes.

Although butyllithium is colorless, n-butyllithium is usually encountered as a pale yellow solution in alkanes. Such solutions are stable indefinitely if properly stored, but in practice, they degrade upon aging, where a fine white precipitate (lithium hydride) is deposited and the color changes to orange.

== Structure and bonding ==
n-BuLi exists as a cluster both in the solid state and in a solution. The tendency to aggregate is common for organolithium compounds. The aggregates are held together by delocalized covalent bonds between lithium and the terminal carbon of the butyl chain. In the case of n-BuLi, the clusters are tetrameric (in ether) or hexameric (in cyclohexane). The cluster is a distorted cubane-type cluster with Li and CH_{2}R groups at alternating vertices. An equivalent description describes the tetramer as a Li_{4} tetrahedron interpenetrated with a tetrahedron [CH_{2}R]_{4}. Bonding within the cluster is related to that used to describe diborane, but more complex since eight atoms are involved. Reflecting its electron-rich character, n-butyllithium is highly reactive toward Lewis acids.

Due to the large difference between the electronegativities of carbon (2.55) and lithium (0.98), the C−Li bond is highly polarized. The charge separation has been estimated to be 55–95%. For practical purposes, n-BuLi can often be considered to react as the butyl anion, n-Bu^{−}, and a lithium cation, Li^{+}.

== Preparation ==
The standard preparation for n-BuLi is reaction of 1-bromobutane or 1-chlorobutane with Li metal:

2 Li + C_{4}H_{9}X → C_{4}H_{9}Li + LiX (X = Cl, Br)

If the lithium used for this reaction contains 1–3% sodium, the reaction proceeds more quickly than if pure lithium is used. Solvents used for this preparation include benzene, cyclohexane, and diethyl ether. When BuBr is the precursor, the product is a homogeneous solution, consisting of a mixed cluster containing both LiBr and BuLi, together with a small amount of octane. BuLi forms a weaker complex with LiCl, so that the reaction of BuCl with Li produces a precipitate of LiCl.

Solutions of butyllithium, which are susceptible to degradation by air, are standardized by titration. A popular weak acid is biphenyl-4-methanol, which gives a deeply colored dilithio derivative at the end point.

== Applications ==
Butyllithium is principally valued as an initiator for the anionic polymerization of dienes, such as butadiene. The reaction is called "carbolithiation":

C_{4}H_{9}Li + CH_{2}=CH−CH=CH_{2} → C_{4}H_{9}−CH_{2}−CH=CH−CH_{2}Li

Isoprene can be polymerized stereospecifically in this way. Also of commercial importance is the use of butyllithium for the production of styrene-butadiene polymers. Even ethylene will insert into BuLi.

== Reactions ==
Butyllithium is a strong base (pK_{b} ≈ −36), but it is also a powerful nucleophile and reductant, depending on the other reactants. Furthermore, in addition to being a strong nucleophile, n-BuLi binds to aprotic Lewis bases, such as ethers and tertiary amines, which partially disaggregate the clusters by binding to the lithium centers. Its use as a strong base is referred to as metalation. Reactions are typically conducted in tetrahydrofuran and diethyl ether, which are good solvents for the resulting organolithium derivatives (see below).

=== Metalation ===
One of the most useful chemical properties of n-BuLi is its ability to deprotonate a wide range of weak Brønsted acids. t-Butyllithium and s-butyllithium are more basic. n-BuLi can deprotonate (that is, metalate) many types of C−H bonds, especially where the conjugate base is stabilized by electron delocalization or one or more heteroatoms (non-carbon atoms). Examples include acetylenes (H−CC−R), methyl sulfides (H−CH_{2}SR), thioacetals (H−CH(SR)_{2}, e.g. dithiane), methylphosphines (H−CH_{2}PR_{2}), furans, thiophenes and ferrocene (Fe(H−C_{5}H_{4})(C_{5}H_{5})). In addition to these, it will also deprotonate all more acidic compounds such as alcohols, amines, enolizable carbonyl compounds, and any overtly acidic compounds, to produce alkoxides, amides, enolates and other salts of lithium, respectively. The stability and volatility of the butane resulting from such deprotonation reactions is convenient, but can also be a problem for large-scale reactions because of the volume of a flammable gas produced.

LiC_{4}H_{9} + RH → C_{4}H_{10} + RLi

The kinetic basicity of n-BuLi is affected by the solvent or cosolvent. Ligands that complex Li^{+} such as tetrahydrofuran (THF), tetramethylethylenediamine (TMEDA), hexamethylphosphoramide (HMPA), and 1,4-diazabicyclo[2.2.2]octane (DABCO) further polarize the Li−C bond and accelerate the metalation. Such additives can also aid in the isolation of the lithiated product, a famous example of which is dilithioferrocene.

Fe(C_{5}H_{5})_{2} + 2 LiC_{4}H_{9} + 2 TMEDA → 2 C_{4}H_{10} + Fe(C_{5}H_{4}Li)_{2}(TMEDA)_{2}

Schlosser's base is a superbase produced by treating butyllithium with potassium t-butoxide. It is kinetically more reactive than butyllithium and is often used to accomplish difficult metalations. While some n-butylpotassium is present and is a stronger base than n-BuLi, the reactivity of the mixture is not exactly the same as isolated n-butylpotassium.

An example of the use of n-butyllithium as a base is the addition of an amine to methyl carbonate to form a methyl carbamate, where n-butyllithium serves to deprotonate the amine:

n-BuLi + R_{2}NH + (MeO)_{2}CO → R_{2}NCO_{2}Me + LiOMe + BuH

=== Halogen–lithium exchange ===
Butyllithium reacts with some organic bromides and iodides in an exchange reaction to form the corresponding organolithium derivative. The reaction usually fails with organic chlorides and fluorides:

C_{4}H_{9}Li + RX → C_{4}H_{9}X + RLi (X = Br, I)

This lithium–halogen exchange reaction is useful for preparation of several types of RLi compounds, particularly aryllithium and some vinyllithium reagents. The utility of this method is significantly limited, however, by the presence in the reaction mixture of n-BuBr or n-BuI, which can react with the RLi reagent formed, and by competing dehydrohalogenation reactions, in which n-BuLi serves as a base:

2 C_{4}H_{9}Br + RLi → 2 C_{4}H_{9}R + LiBr

2 C_{4}H_{9}Li + R′CH=CHBr → 2 C_{4}H_{10} + R′C≡CLi + LiBr

These side reaction are significantly less important for RI than for RBr, since the iodine–lithium exchange is several orders of magnitude faster than the bromine–lithium exchange. For these reasons, aryl, vinyl and primary alkyl iodides are the preferred substrates, and t-BuLi rather than n-BuLi is usually used, since the formed t-BuI is immediately destroyed by the t-BuLi in a dehydrohalogenation reaction (thus requiring two equivalents of t-BuLi). Alternatively, vinyl lithium reagents can be generated by direct reaction of the vinyl halide (e.g. cyclohexenyl chloride) with lithium or by tin–lithium exchange (see next section).

=== Transmetalations ===
A related family of reactions are the transmetalations, wherein two organometallic compounds exchange their metals. Many examples of such reactions involve lithium exchange with tin:

C_{4}H_{9}Li + Me_{3}SnAr → C_{4}H_{9}SnMe_{3} + LiAr (where Ar is aryl and Me is methyl)

The tin–lithium exchange reactions have one major advantage over the halogen–lithium exchanges for the preparation of organolithium reagents, in that the product tin compounds (C_{4}H_{9}SnMe_{3} in the example above) are much less reactive towards lithium reagents than are the halide products of the corresponding halogen–lithium exchanges (C_{4}H_{9}Br or C_{4}H_{9}Cl). Other metals and metalloids which undergo such exchange reactions are organic compounds of mercury, selenium, and tellurium.

=== Carbonyl additions ===
Organolithium reagents, including n-BuLi are used in synthesis of specific aldehydes and ketones. One such synthetic pathway is the reaction of an organolithium reagent with disubstituted amides:

R^{1}Li + R^{2}CONMe_{2} → LiNMe_{2} + R^{2}C(O)R^{1}

=== Degradation of THF ===
THF is deprotonated by butyllithium, especially in the presence of TMEDA, by loss of one of four protons adjacent to oxygen. This process, which consumes butyllithium to generate butane, induces a ring opening to give enolate of acetaldehyde and ethylene. Therefore, reactions of BuLi in THF are typically conducted at low temperatures, such as −78 °C, as is conveniently produced by a freezing bath of dry ice and acetone. Higher temperatures (−25 °C or even −15 °C) are also used.

=== Thermal decomposition ===
When heated, n-BuLi, analogously to other alkyllithium reagents with "β-hydrogens", undergoes β-hydride elimination to produce 1-butene and lithium hydride (LiH):

C_{4}H_{9}Li → LiH + CH_{3}CH_{2}CH=CH_{2}

== Safety ==
Alkyl-lithium compounds are stored under inert gas to prevent loss of activity and for reasons of safety. n-BuLi reacts violently with water:

C_{4}H_{9}Li + H_{2}O → C_{4}H_{10} + LiOH

This is an exergonic and highly exothermic reaction. If oxygen is present the butane produced may ignite.

BuLi also reacts with CO_{2} to give lithium pentanoate:

C_{4}H_{9}Li + CO_{2} → C_{4}H_{9}CO_{2}Li

== See also ==
- Propynyllithium, an organometallic compound.
