= Metal–halogen exchange =

Chemical reaction

In organometallic chemistry, metal–halogen exchange is a fundamental reaction that converts an organic halide into an organometallic product. The reaction commonly involves the use of electropositive metals (Li, Na, Mg) and organochlorides, bromides, and iodides. Particularly well-developed is the use of metal–halogen exchange for the preparation of organolithium compounds.

== Lithium–halogen exchange ==
Two kinds of lithium–halogen exchange can be considered: reactions involving organolithium compounds and reactions involving lithium metal. Commercial organolithium compounds are produced by the heterogeneous (slurry) reaction of lithium with organic bromides and chlorides:

2 Li + R−X → LiX + R−Li

Often the lithium halide remains in the soluble product.

Most of this article is about the homogeneous (one-phase) reaction of preformed organolithium compounds:

R−Li + R′−X → R−X + R′−Li

Butyllithium is commonly used. Gilman and Wittig independently discovered this method in the late 1930s. It is not a salt metathesis reaction, as no salt is produced.

Lithium–halogen exchange is frequently used to prepare vinyl-, aryl- and primary alkyllithium reagents. Vinyl halides usually undergo lithium–halogen exchange with retention of the stereochemistry of the double bond. The presence of alkoxyl or related chelating groups accelerates lithium–halogen exchange. Lithium halogen exchange is typically a fast reaction. It is usually faster than nucleophilic addition and can sometimes exceed the rate of proton transfer.

Exchange rates usually follow the trend I > Br > Cl. Alkyl- and arylfluoride are generally unreactive toward organolithium reagents. Lithium–halogen exchange is kinetically controlled, and the rate of exchange is primarily influenced by the stabilities of the carbanion intermediates (sp > sp^{2} > sp^{3}) of the organolithium reagents.

=== Mechanism and scope ===
Two mechanisms have been proposed for lithium–halogen exchange. One proposed pathway involves a nucleophilic mechanism that generates a reversible "ate-complex" intermediate. Farnham and Calabrese crystallized an "ate-complex" lithium bis(pentafluorophenyl) iodinate complexed with TMEDA. The "ate-complex" further reacts with electrophiles and provides pentafluorophenyl iodide and C_{6}H_{5}Li. A number of kinetic studies also support a nucleophilic pathway in which the carbanion on the lithium species attacks the halogen atom on the aryl halide. Another proposed mechanism involves single electron transfer with the generation of radicals. In reactions of secondary and tertiary alkyllithium and alkyl halides, radical species were detected by EPR spectroscopy. The mechanistic studies of lithium–halogen exchange are complicated by the formation of aggregates of organolithium species.

== Other metals ==
Magnesium–halogen exchange

Grignard reagents can be prepared by treating a preformed Grignard reagent with an organic halide. This method offers the advantage that the Mg transfer tolerates many functional groups. A typical reaction involves isopropylmagnesium chloride and aryl bromide or iodides:

i-PrMgCl + ArBr → i-PrBr + ArMgCl

Zinc–halogen exchange

Zinc–halogen exchange:

LiBu_{3}Zn + R−I → Li[R−ZnBu_{2}] + BuI

== Applications ==
Several examples can be found in organic syntheses.

Below lithium–halogen exchange is a step in the synthesis of morphine. Here n-butyllithium is used to perform lithium–halogen exchange with bromide. The nucleophilic carbanion center quickly undergoes carbolithiation to the double bond, generating an anion stabilized by the adjacent sulfone group. An intramolecular S_{N}2 reaction by the anion forms the cyclic backbone of morphine.

Synthesis of morphine using lithium–halogen exchange

Lithium–halogen exchange is a crucial part of Parham cyclization. In this reaction, an aryl halide (usually iodide or bromide) exchanges with organolithium to form a lithiated arene species. If the arene bears a side chain with an electrophillic moiety, the carbanion attached to the lithium will perform intramolecular nucleophilic attack and cyclize. This reaction is a useful strategy for heterocycle formation. In the example below, Parham cyclization was used to in the cyclization of an isocyanate to form isoindolinone, which was then converted to a nitrone. The nitrone species further reacts with radicals and can be used as "spin traps" to study biological radical processes.

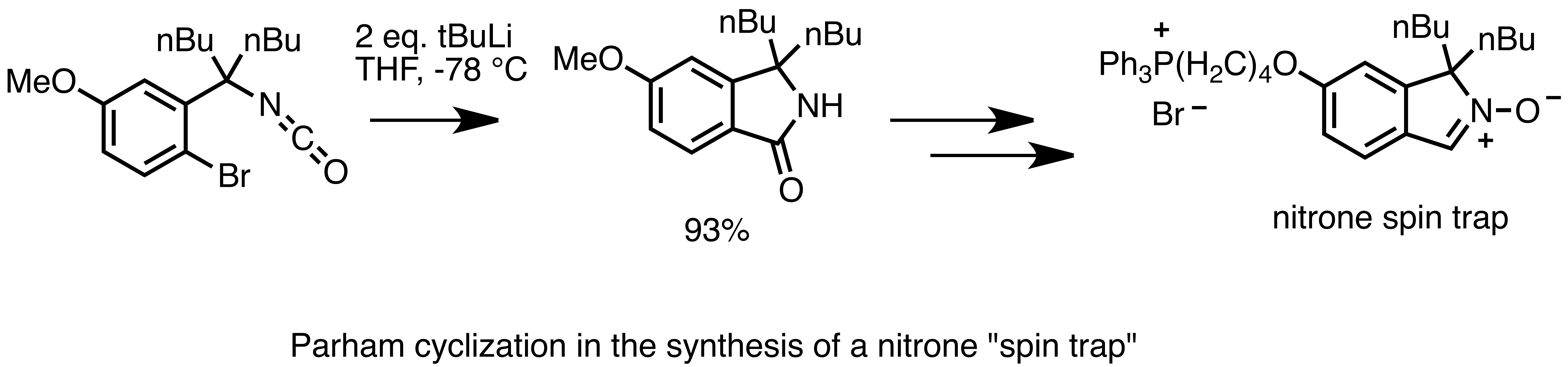
Parham cyclization in MitoSpin
