= Naphthalenide =

Naphthalenide is a radical anion of naphthalene.

It is found in the following compounds:

- Lithium naphthalenide
- Sodium naphthalenide
