= Organolithium chemistry =

Science of organolithium compounds

Organolithium chemistry is the science of organolithium compounds describing their physical properties, synthesis, and reactions. Organolithium compounds in organometallic chemistry contain carbon-lithium chemical bonds. A major subset and perhaps the most used organolithium compounds are organolithium reagents, such as butyllithium

== Classification ==
=== Alkyl and aryl monolithium compounds ===
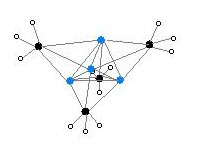
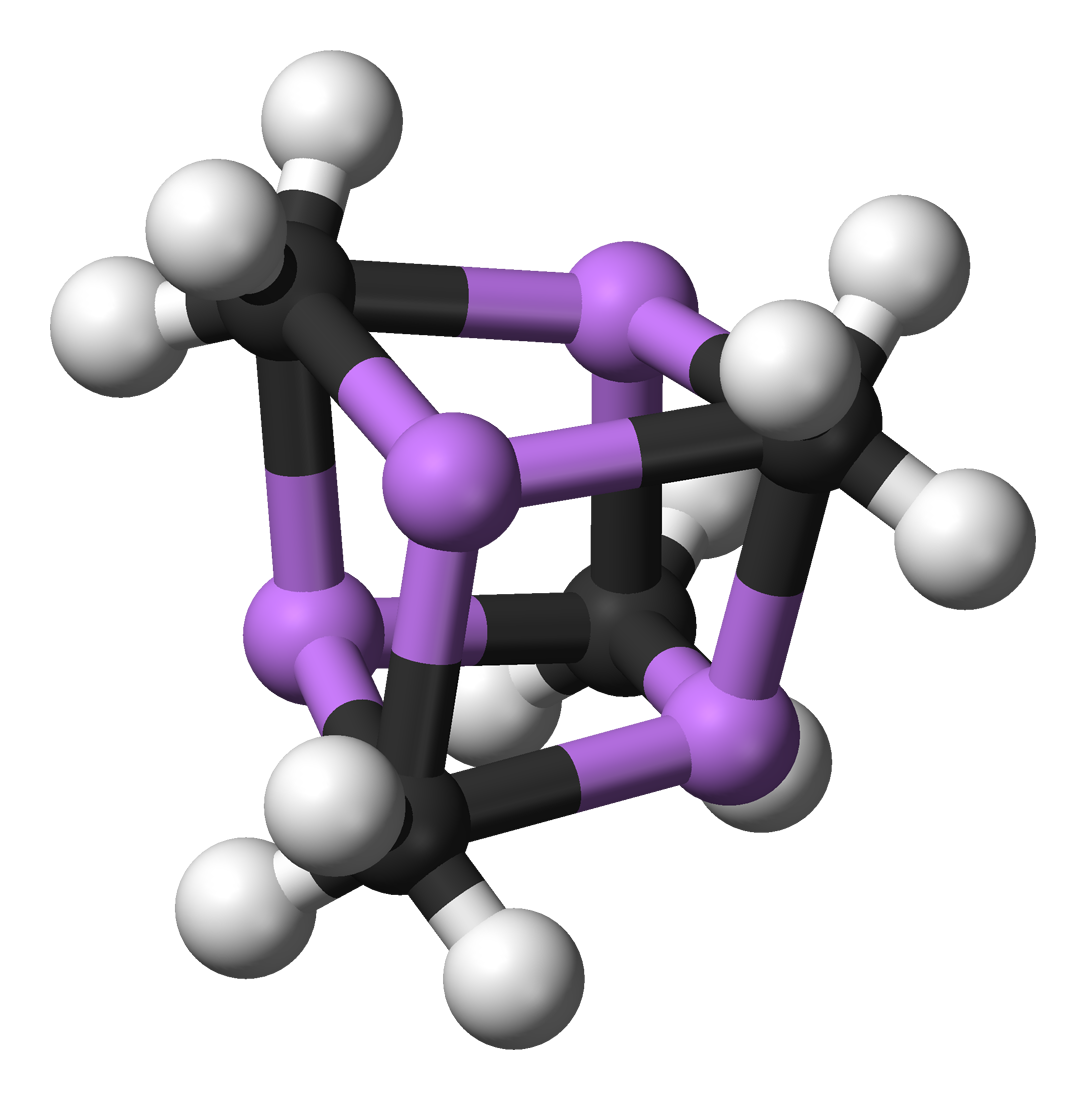
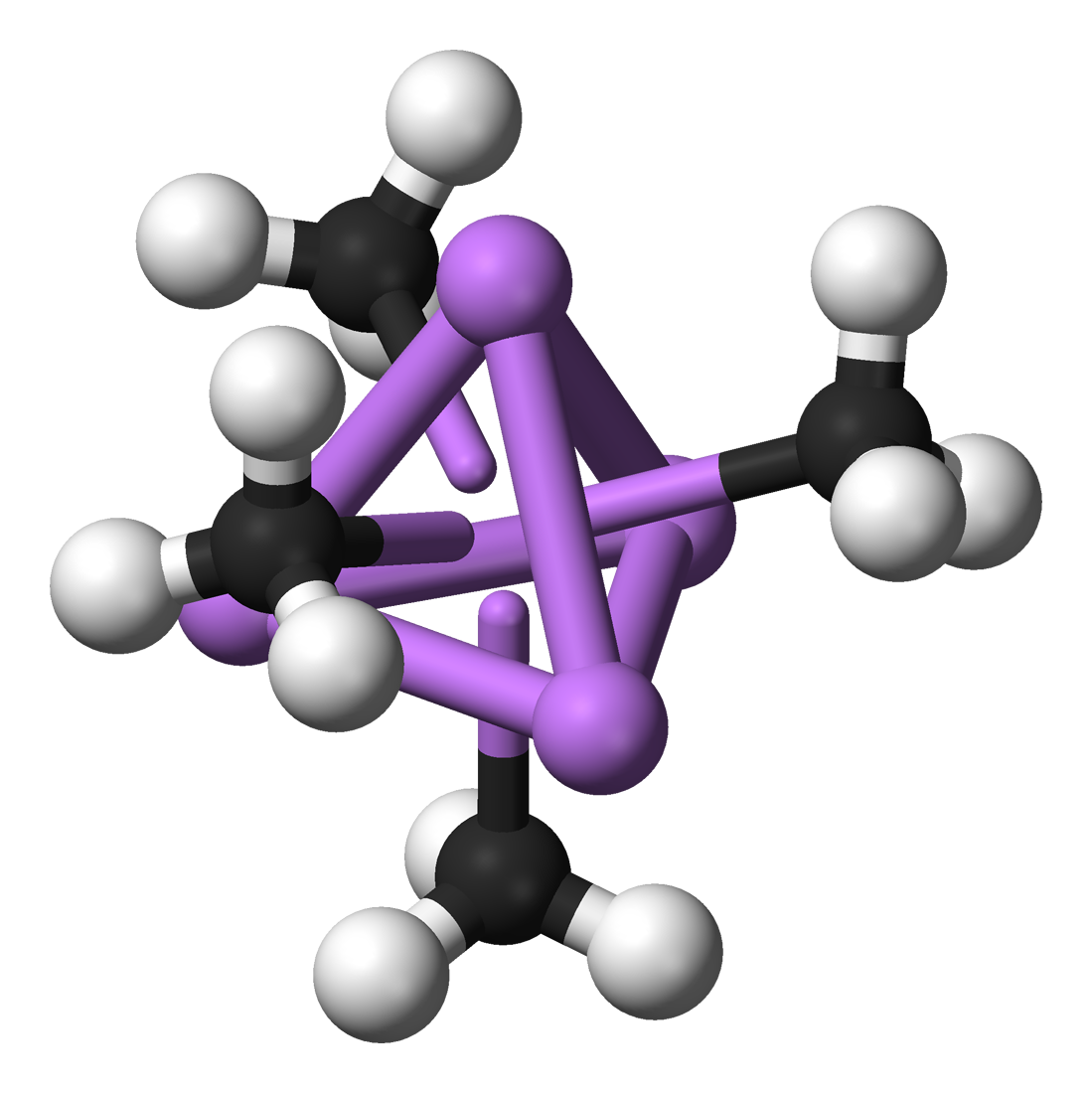
Various depictions of the methyl lithium tetramer. Colour code: Li- purple C- black H- white

Alkyl and aryl monolithium are illustrated by their simplest members, methyl lithium and phenyl lithium. These useful reagents have complicated structures owing to the tendency of the C-Li unit to aggregate, forming clusters. These compounds are prepared by metal-halogen exchange, which entails stirring solutions of the alkyl halide with lithium metal:

CH_{3}Br + Li → CH_{3}Li + LiBr

=== Lithium-reduced polycyclic aromatics ===
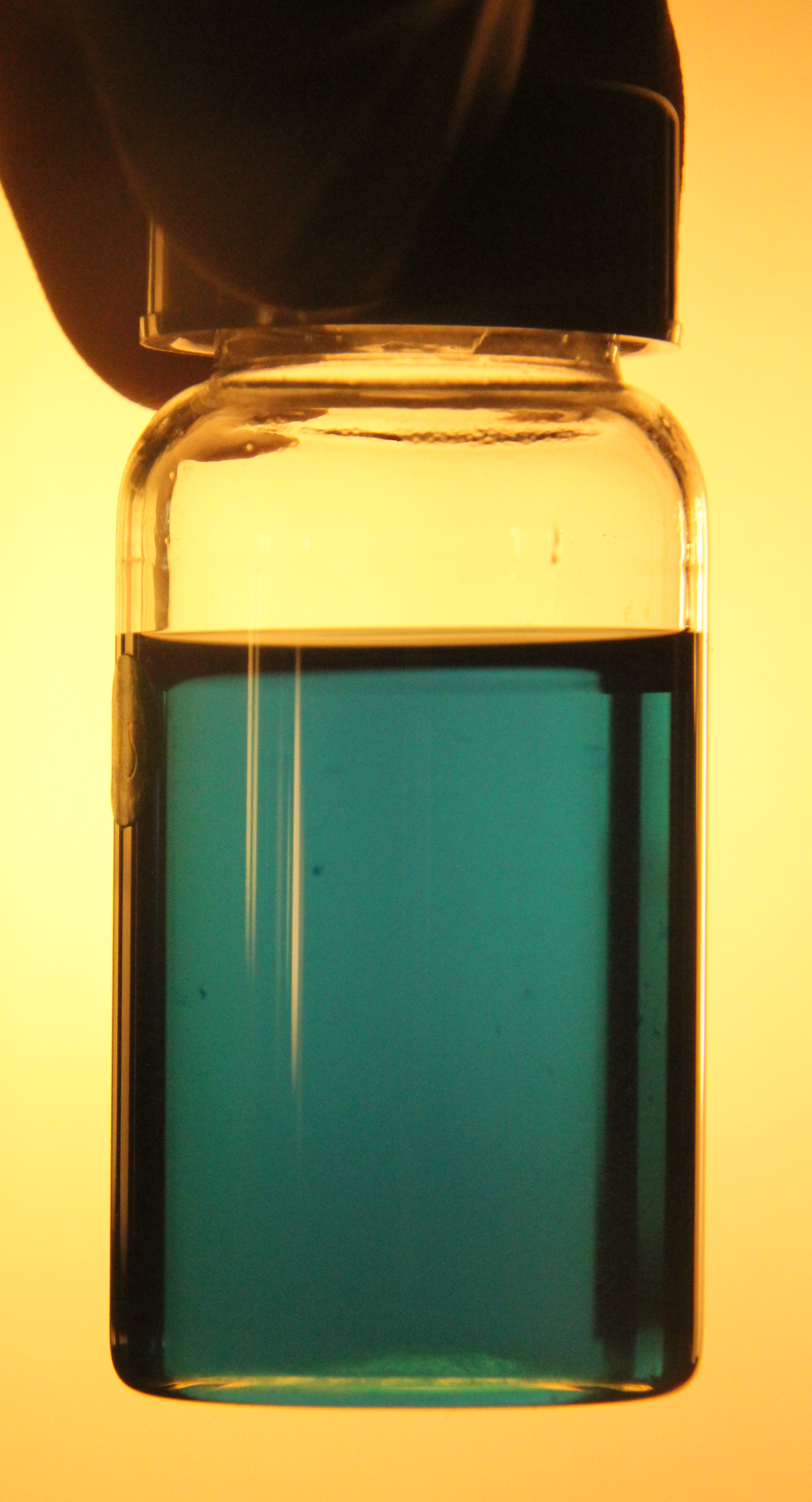
A solution of lithium naphthenide in tetrahydrofuran

Naphthalene, anthracene, and related polycyclic aromatic compounds are reduced by lithium to give Li^{+} salts of their radical anions:

C_{10}H_{8} + Li → Li^{+}C_{10}H^{−}_{8}

Lithium naphthalene (Li^{+}[C_{10}H_{8}]^{−}) is used as a reductant in the synthesis of organic, organometallic, and inorganic chemistry.

=== Dilithio compounds ===
These compounds, which have two C-Li bonds can be classified into two distinct groups. Simplest but rare is dilithiomethanide (CH_{2}Li_{2}) and its many derivatives. Some derivatives have even been characterized by X-ray crystallography.

The more common dilithiated organic compounds the Li atoms are bound to separate carbon atoms. 1,4-dilithiobutane (LiCH_{2}CH_{2}CH_{2}CH_{2}Li) would be an example.

Dilithioacetylide (Li_{2}C_{2}, again is not a salt, but adopts a distorted anti-fluorite crystal structure, similar to that of rubidium peroxide (Rb_{2}O_{2}).

=== Tetralithio compounds ===
Tetralithiomethane has attracted attention mainly for theoretical reasons. Its structure remains uncertain, but some speculation posited planar carbon.
