= C10H10 =

C_{10}H_{10} may refer to:

Compounds sharing the molecular formula:

- Basketene
- Bullvalene
- Cyclodecapentaene
- Dihydronaphthalene
  - Dialin (1,2-Dihydronaphthalene)
  - 1,4-Dihydronaphthalene
- Divinylbenzene
- Diisopropenyldiacetylene
- Pentaprismane ([5]Prismane)
- Triquinacene
