= 1,4-Dihydronaphthalene =

- Structural formula of 1,4-dihydronaphthalene

Names
- IUPAC name 1,4-Dihydronaphthalene
- Other names: Δ^{2}-Dialin

Identifiers
CAS Number	612-17-9
3D model (JSmol)	Interactive image
ChEBI	CHEBI:38143
ChemSpider	62370
ECHA InfoCard	100.009.362
EC Number	210-297-0
PubChem CID	69155
UNII	C56X9SYS4F
CompTox Dashboard (EPA)	DTXSID9060607
- InChI: InChI=1S/C10H10/c1-2-6-10-8-4-3-7-9(10)5-1/h1-6H,7-8H2 Key: FUPIVZHYVSCYLX-UHFFFAOYSA-N
- SMILES: C1C=CCC2=CC=CC=C21

Properties
Chemical formula	C_{10}H_{10}
Molar mass	130.190 g·mol^{−1}
Appearance	Colorless liquid (25 °C)
Density	0.9928 g/cm^{3} (33 °C)
Melting point	24.6 °C (76.3 °F; 297.8 K)
Boiling point	210 °C (410 °F; 483 K)
Refractive index (n_{D})	1.5577 (20 °C)

Hazards
- GHS labelling
Pictograms	(GHS02: Flammable)
Signal word	Danger
Hazard statements	H225
Precautionary statements	P210, P233, P240, P241, P242, P243, P280, P303+P361+P353, P370+P378, P403+P235, P501

Related compounds
Related compounds	Naphthalene; 1,2-Dihydronaphthalene
- Except where otherwise noted, data are given for materials in their standard state (at 25 °C [77 °F], 100 kPa). Infobox references

1,4-Dihydronaphthalene is an aromatic hydrocarbon with the molecular formula C_{10}H_{10}. The compound is a derivative of naphthalene and differs from it by having one partially saturated ring. It can be synthesized by reduction of naphthalene with sodium in ethanol.

1,4-Dihydronaphthalene is unstable and can isomerize to 1,2-dihydronaphthalene in a solution of sodium ethoxide in ethanol:
