= Semidione =

1,2-semidione resonance contributor

Semidiones are radical anions analogous to semiquinones, obtained from the one-electron reduction of non-quinone conjugated dicarbonyls.

The simplest possible semidiones are derived from 1,2-dicarbonyls and have structure R−C(−O^{−})=C(−O^{•})−R' ↔ R−C(−O^{•})=C(−O^{−})−R', making them the second member of a homologous series starting with ketyl radicals and continuing with semitriones. They are often transient intermediates, appearing in reactions such as the final reduction step of the acyloin condensation.

Benzil semidione (Ph−C(−O^{−})=C(−O^{•})−Ph ↔ Ph−C(−O^{•})=C(−O^{−})−Ph), synthesized by Auguste Laurent in 1836, is believed to have been the first radical ion ever characterized.

Semidehydroascorbate is a relatively stable semitrione produced by hydrogen abstraction from ascorbate (Vitamin C).
