= Tetralithiomethane =

Chemical compound

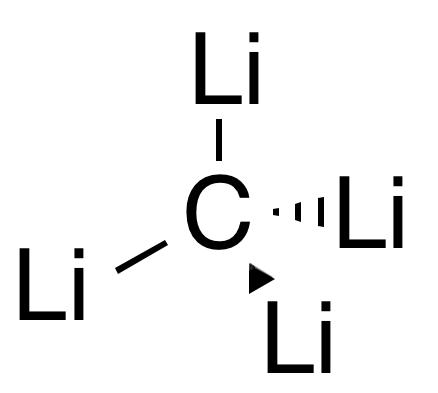

Names
- IUPAC name Tetralithiomethane
- Other names: Carbon tetralithium; Lithium carbide; Tetralithium carbide

Identifiers
CAS Number	38827-79-1
3D model (JSmol)	Interactive image
- InChI: InChI=1S/C.4Li Key: SOAIVWSMVGHHPJ-UHFFFAOYSA-N
- SMILES: [Li]C([Li])([Li])[Li]

Properties
Chemical formula	CLi_{4}
Molar mass	39.77 g·mol^{−1}
Appearance	Red solid
Melting point	225 °C (437 °F; 498 K) (decomposes)
Solubility in water	Hydrolysis
Solubility	Soluble in cyclohexane

Hazards
- GHS labelling
Pictograms	(GHS02: Flammable)

Related compounds
Related compounds	Methane; Methyllithium; Lithium acetylide; Lithium nitride; Lithium phosphide; Lithium arsenide; Lithium oxide
- Except where otherwise noted, data are given for materials in their standard state (at 25 °C [77 °F], 100 kPa). Infobox references

Tetralithiomethane, also known as tetralithium carbide, is an organolithium compound with the formula CLi_{4}. It is an extremely pyrophoric red solid and is the lithium analog of methane.

== Production ==
Its main route of production is by the lithiation of tetrakis(chloromercurio)methane (C(HgCl)_{4}) by tert-butyllithium. It can also be produced by the reaction of lithium metal and carbon tetrachloride at 900 °C:

8 Li + CCl_{4} → CLi_{4} + 4 LiCl

However, this method also produces byproducts, such as lithium carbide.

== Reactions ==
Tetralithiomethane is an extremely strong base, and hydrolyzes vigorously in contact with water producing methane gas and lithium hydroxide:

CLi_{4} + 4 H_{2}O → CH_{4} + 4 LiOH

Deuterated methane CD_{4} can also be produced by reacting heavy water with tetralithiomethane.

CLi_{4} + 4 D_{2}O → CD_{4} + 4 LiOD

When tetralithiomethane is heated to 225 °C, it decomposes to lithium carbide and lithium metal.

Due to the known affinity of lithium ions Li^{+} for hydrogen molecules H_{2} and therefore potential applications in hydrogen storage materials, tetralithiomethane has been studied computationally for its aggregation, H_{2} affinity, and binding to various graphene-type surfaces.
