= Sodium naphthalenide =

Names
- Preferred IUPAC name Sodium naphthalenide
- Systematic IUPAC name Sodium naphthalen-1-ide
- Other names sodium naphthenide, sodium naphthalide

Identifiers
CAS Number	3481-12-7
3D model (JSmol)	Interactive image
ChemSpider	10004279
ECHA InfoCard	100.020.420
EC Number	222-460-3
PubChem CID	11829632
CompTox Dashboard (EPA)	DTXSID50188347
- InChI: InChI=1S/C10H8.Na/c1-2-6-10-8-4-3-7-9(10)5-1;/h1-8H;/q-1;+1 Key: NCVIXNVCXNGGBW-UHFFFAOYSA-N; InChI=1/C10H8.Na/c1-2-6-10-8-4-3-7-9(10)5-1;/h1-8H;/q-1;+1 Key: NCVIXNVCXNGGBW-UHFFFAOYAJ
- SMILES: c1ccc2=C[CH][CH-]C=c2c1.[Na+]

Properties
Chemical formula	Na^{+}[C_{10}H_{8}]^{−}
Molar mass	151.164 g·mol^{−1}
Appearance	Deep green crystals

Related compounds
Other cations	Lithium naphthalenide
- Except where otherwise noted, data are given for materials in their standard state (at 25 °C [77 °F], 100 kPa). verify (what is ?) Infobox references

Sodium naphthalenide is an organic salt with the chemical formula Na^{+}[C_{10}H_{8}]^{−}. In the research laboratory, it is used as a reducing agent in the synthesis of organic, organometallic, and inorganic chemistry. It is usually generated in situ. When isolated, it invariably crystallizes as a solvate with ligands bound to Na^{+}.

== Preparation and properties ==
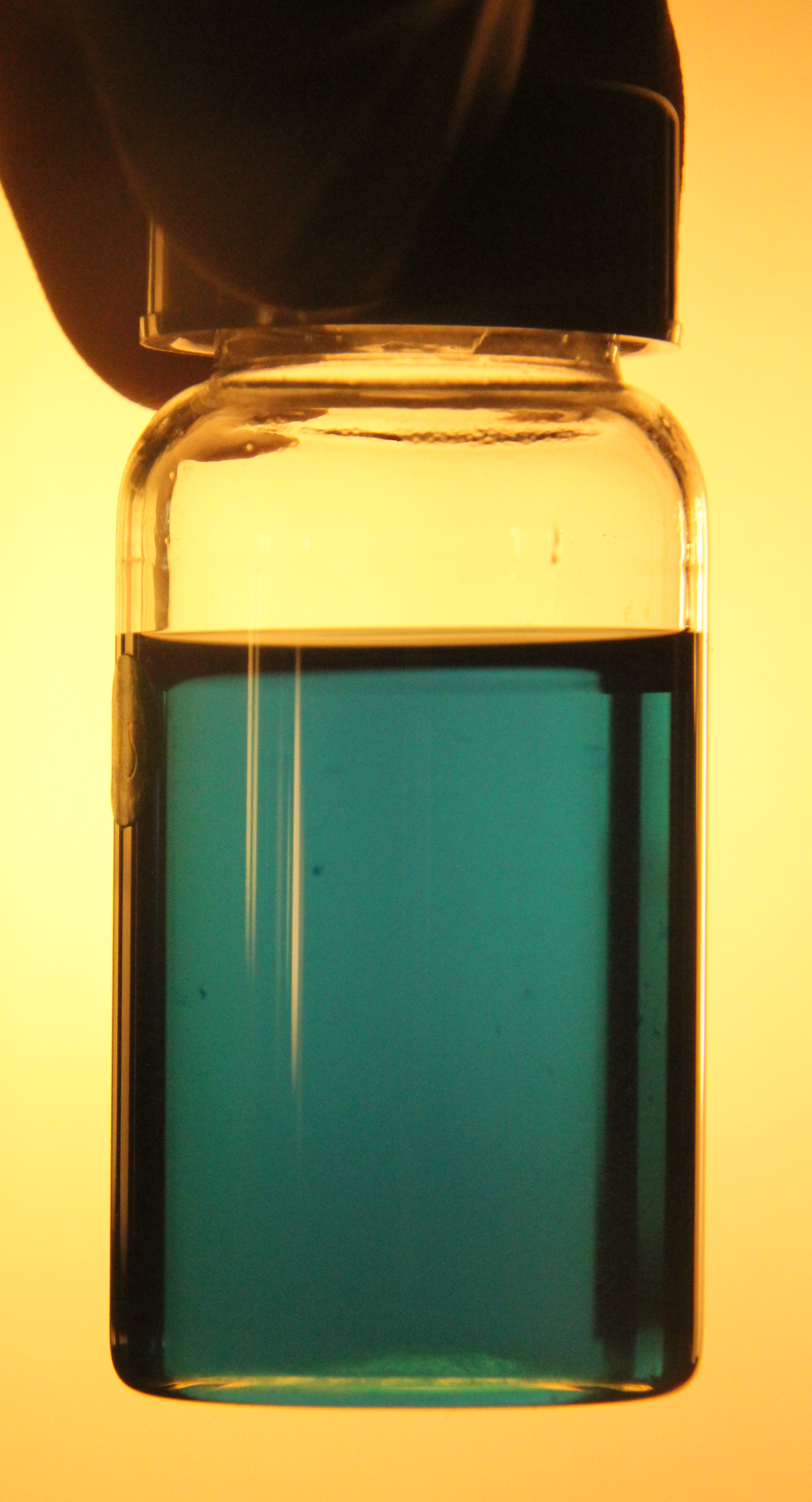
A solution of lithium naphthalenide, the lithium salt of naphthalene, in tetrahydrofuran

The alkali metal naphthalene salts are prepared by stirring the metal with naphthalene in an ethereal solvent, usually as tetrahydrofuran or dimethoxyethane. The resulting salt is dark green. The anion is a radical, giving a strong EPR signal near g = 2.0. Its deep green color arises from absorptions centered at 463 and 735 nm.

Several solvates of sodium naphthalenide have been characterized by X-ray crystallography. The effects are subtle, the outer pair of CH−CH bonds contract by 3 pm and the other nine C−C bonds elongate by 2–3 pm. The net effect is that reduction weakens the bonding.

== Reactions ==
=== Redox ===
With a reduction potential near −2.5 V relative to the standard hydrogen electrode, the naphthalene radical anion is a strong reducing agent.

It defluorinates PTFE and is commonly used for chemically etching PTFE to allow adhesion.

=== Protonation ===
The anion is strongly basic, and a typical degradation pathway involves reaction with water and related protic sources such as alcohols. These reactions afford dihydronaphthalene:

2 Na^{+}[C_{10}H_{8}]^{−} + 2 H_{2}O → C_{10}H_{10} + C_{10}H_{8} + 2 NaOH

=== As a ligand ===
Alkali metal salts of the naphthalene radical anion are used to prepare complexes of naphthalene.
