= Radical anion =

Free radical species

Sodium naphthalenide, a salt containing the radical anion of naphthalene as the anion

In organic chemistry, a radical anion is a free radical species that carries a negative charge. Radical anions are encountered in organic chemistry as reduced derivatives of polycyclic aromatic compounds, e.g. sodium naphthalenide. An example of a non-carbon radical anion is the superoxide anion, formed by transfer of one electron to an oxygen molecule. Radical anions are typically indicated by $M^{\bullet -}$.

== Polycyclic radical anions ==
Many aromatic compounds can undergo one-electron reduction by alkali metals. The electron is transferred from the alkali metal ion to an unoccupied antibonding p-p п* orbital of the aromatic molecule. This transfer is usually only energetically favorable if the aprotic solvent efficiently solvates the alkali metal ion. Effective solvents are those that bind to the alkali metal cation: diethyl ether < THF < 1,2-dimethoxyethane < HMPA. In principle any unsaturated molecule can form a radical anion, but the antibonding orbitals are only energetically accessible in more extensive conjugated systems. Ease of formation is in the order benzene < naphthalene < anthracene < pyrene, etc. Salts of the radical anions are often not isolated as solids but used in situ. They are usually deeply colored.

- Naphthalene in the form of
  - Lithium naphthalenide is obtained from the reaction of naphthalene with lithium.
  - Sodium naphthalenide is obtained from the reaction of naphthalene with sodium.
  - Sodium 1-methylnaphthalene and 1-methylnaphthalene are more soluble than sodium naphthalenide and naphthalene, respectively.
- Biphenyl as its lithium salt.
- Acenaphthylene is a milder reductant than the naphthalene anion.
- Anthracene in the form of its alkali metal salts.
- Pyrene as its sodium salt.
- Perylene in the form of its alkali metal (M = Li, Na, Cs) etherates.

== Other examples ==
Elemental potassium reduces cyclooctatetraene to dipotassium cyclooctatetraenide. The cyclooctatetraenide anion (dianion) is a 10-pi electron system, which conforms to the Huckel rule for aromaticity. Quinone is reduced to a semiquinone radical anion. Semidiones are derived from the reduction of dicarbonyl compounds.

== Reactions ==
=== Redox ===
The pi-radical anions are used as reducing agents in specialized syntheses. Being soluble in at least some solvents, these salts act faster than the alkali metals themselves. The disadvantages are that the polycyclic hydrocarbon must be removed. The reduction potential of alkali metal naphthalene salts is about 3.1 V (vs Fc^{+/0}). The reduction potentials of the larger systems are lower, for example acenaphthalene is 2.45 V. Many radical anions are susceptible to further reduction to dianions.

reduction potentials for various M(18-crown-6)^{+}hydrocarbon^{−}
hydrocarbon	M^{+}	E_{1/2}	comments
naphthalene	Li^{+}	-3.09 V	can be reduced to dianion
naphthalene	Na^{+}	-3.09 V	
biphenyl	Li^{+}	-3.18 V	
anthracene	Na^{+}	-2.53 V	
perylene	Na^{+}	-2.19 V	includes dme solvate

=== Protonation ===
Addition of a proton source (even water) to a radical anion results in protonation, i.e. the sequence of reduction followed by protonation is equivalent to hydrogenation. For instance, the anthracene radical anion forms mainly (but not exclusively) 9,10-dihydroanthracene. Radical anions and their protonation are central to the Birch reduction.

=== Coordination to metal ions ===
Radical anions of polycyclic aromatic compounds function as ligands in organometallic chemistry.

== See also ==
- Radical cation
