= Dilithium acetylide =

Chemical compound of lithium and carbon, an acetylide

- LiC≡CLi

Names
- Preferred IUPAC name Lithium acetylide
- Systematic IUPAC name Lithium ethynediide
- Other names: Dilithium acetylide; Lithium dicarbon; Lithium percarbide

Identifiers
CAS Number	1070-75-3
3D model (JSmol)	Interactive image
ChemSpider	59503
ECHA InfoCard	100.012.710
EC Number	213-980-1
PubChem CID	66115
UNII	GZ7TQ3WG5P
- InChI: InChI=1S/C2.2Li/c1-2;;/q-2;2*+1 Key: ARNWQMJQALNBBV-UHFFFAOYSA-N; InChI=1S/C2.2Li/c1-2;;/q-2;2*+1 Key: ARNWQMJQALNBBV-UHFFFAOYSA-N; InChI=1/C2.2Li/c1-2;;/q-2;2*+1 Key: ARNWQMJQALNBBV-UHFFFAOYAB
- SMILES: [Li+].[Li+].[C-]#[C-]

Properties
Chemical formula	Li_{2}C_{2}
Molar mass	37.9034 g/mol
Appearance	Powder
Density	1.3 g/cm^{3}
Melting point	725 K (452°C, 846°F)
Solubility in water	Reacts
Solubility	insoluble in organic solvents

Related compounds
Related compounds	Tetralithiomethane; Monolithium acetylide; Monosodium acetylide; Copper(I) acetylide; Silver acetylide; Calcium carbide
- Except where otherwise noted, data are given for materials in their standard state (at 25 °C [77 °F], 100 kPa). verify (what is ?) Infobox references

Dilithium acetylide is an organometallic compound with the formula Li_{2}C_{2}. It is typically derived by double deprotonation of acetylene. X-ray crystallography confirms the presence of C≡C subunits attached to lithium, resulting in a polymeric structure. Li_{2}C_{2} is one of an extensive range of lithium-carbon compounds, which include the lithium-rich Li_{4}C, Li_{6}C_{2}, Li_{8}C_{3}, Li_{6}C_{3}, Li_{4}C_{3}, Li_{4}C_{5}, and the graphite intercalation compounds LiC_{6}, LiC_{12}, and LiC_{18}. It is an intermediate compound produced during radiocarbon dating procedures.

Li_{2}C_{2} is the most thermodynamically-stable lithium-rich carbide and the only one that can be obtained directly from the elements. It was first produced by Moissan, in 1896 who reacted coal with lithium carbonate.

Li_{2}CO_{3} + 4 C → Li_{2}C_{2} + 3 CO

The other lithium-rich compounds are produced by reacting lithium vapor with chlorinated hydrocarbons, e.g. CCl_{4}. Lithium carbide is sometimes confused with the drug lithium carbonate, Li_{2}CO_{3}, because of the similarity of its name.

== Preparation and reactions ==
In the laboratory samples may be prepared by treating acetylene with butyl lithium:

C_{2}H_{2} + 2 BuLi → Li_{2}C_{2} + BuH

Instead of butyl lithium, a solution of lithium in ammonia can be used to prepare Li_{2}C_{2}. In this case, a transient adduct Li_{2}C_{2}·C_{2}H_{2}·2NH_{3} is formed. It decomposes with release of ammonia at room temperature.

Samples prepared from acetylene generally are poorly crystalline. Crystalline samples may be prepared by a reaction between molten lithium and graphite at over 1000 °C. Li_{2}C_{2} can also be prepared by reacting CO_{2} with molten lithium.

10 Li + 2 CO_{2} → Li_{2}C_{2} + 4 Li_{2}O

Other method for production of Li_{2}C_{2} is heating of metallic lithium in atmosphere of ethylene. Lithium hydride is a coproduction:

6 Li + C_{2}H_{4} → Li_{2}C_{2} + 4 LiH

Lithium carbide hydrolyzes readily to form acetylene as well as Lithium hydroxide:

Li_{2}C_{2} + 2 H_{2}O → 2 LiOH + C_{2}H_{2}

Lithium hydride reacts with graphite at 400°C forming lithium carbide.

2 LiH + 4 C → Li_{2}C_{2} + C_{2}H_{2}

Dilithium acetylide reacts with acetylene in liquid ammonia rapidly to give a lithium hydrogen acetylide.

LiC≡CLi + HC≡CH → 2 LiC≡CH

Preparation of the reagent in this way sometimes improves the yield in an ethynylation over that obtained with reagent prepared from lithium and acetylene.

== Structure ==
Li_{2}C_{2} could be viewed as a Zintl phase. It is not a salt. It adopts a distorted anti-fluorite crystal structure, similar to that of rubidium peroxide (Rb_{2}O_{2}) and caesium peroxide (Cs_{2}O_{2}). Each lithium atom is surrounded by six carbon atoms from 4 different acetylide anions, with two acetylides co-ordinating side -on and the other two end-on. The relatively short C-C distance of 120 pm indicates the presence of a C≡C triple bond. At high temperatures Li_{2}C_{2} transforms reversibly to a cubic anti-fluorite structure.

== Use in radiocarbon dating ==
There are a number of procedures employed, some that burn the sample producing CO_{2} that is then reacted with lithium, and others where the carbon containing sample is reacted directly with lithium metal. The outcome is the same: Li_{2}C_{2} is produced, which can then be used to create species easy to use in mass spectroscopy, like acetylene and benzene. Note that lithium nitride may be formed and this produces ammonia when hydrolyzed, which contaminates the acetylene gas.
