= Polytetrafluoroethylene =

Synthetic polymer

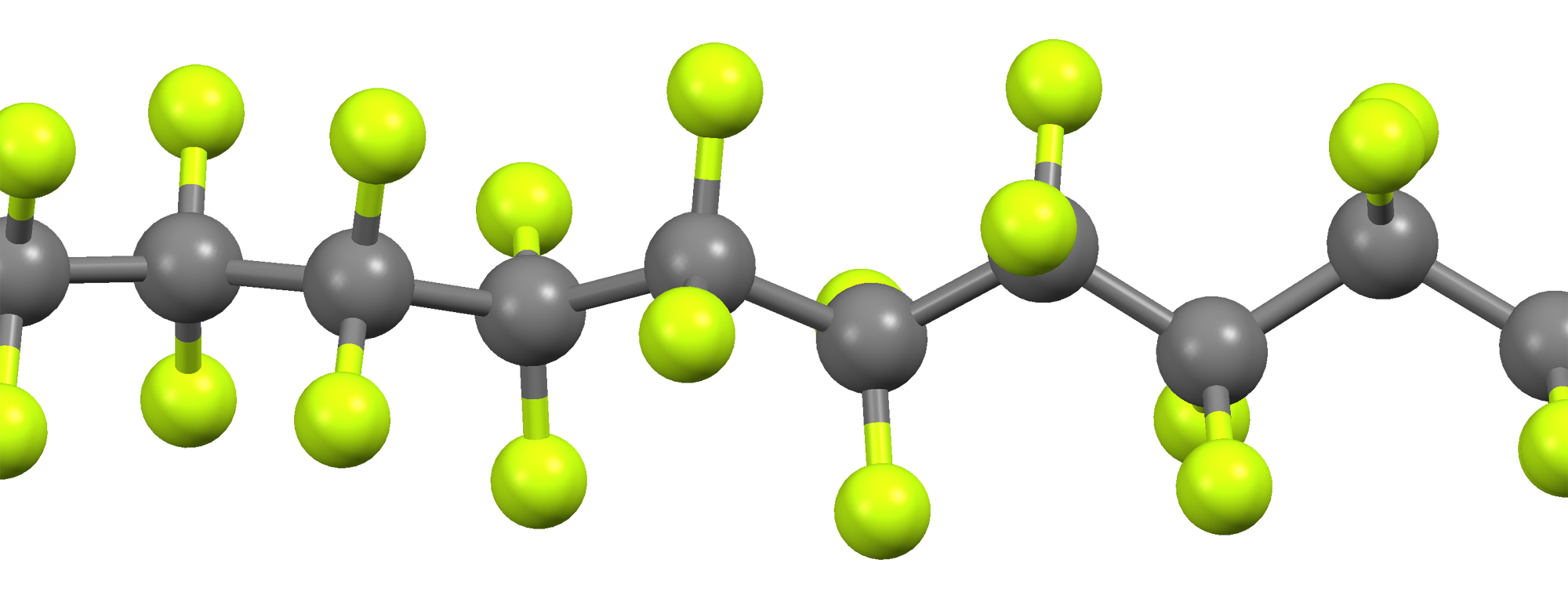

Names
- IUPAC name Poly(1,1,2,2-tetrafluoroethylene)
- Other names Fluon, Poly(tetrafluoroethene), Poly(tetrafluoroethylene), Teflon

Identifiers
CAS Number	9002-84-0
Abbreviations	PTFE
ChEBI	CHEBI:53251
ChemSpider	None
ECHA InfoCard	100.120.367
KEGG	D08974
UNII	E1NC1JVS3O
CompTox Dashboard (EPA)	DTXSID7047724

Properties
Chemical formula	(C_{2}F_{4})_{n}
Density	2200 kg/m^{3}
Melting point	327 °C
Electrical resistivity	10^{18} Ω·cm (Note: Dielectric. Bulk resistivity.)
Thermal conductivity	0.25 W/(m·K)

Hazards
NFPA 704 (fire diamond)	1 0 0 OX
- Except where otherwise noted, data are given for materials in their standard state (at 25 °C [77 °F], 100 kPa). verify (what is ?) Infobox references

Polytetrafluoroethylene (PTFE) is a synthetic fluoropolymer of tetrafluoroethylene, and has numerous applications because it is heat resistant and chemically inert. The commonly known brand name of PTFE-based composition is Teflon by Chemours, a spin-off from DuPont, which originally invented the compound in 1938.

Polytetrafluoroethylene is a fluorocarbon solid, as it is a high-molecular-weight polymer consisting wholly of carbon and fluorine. PTFE is hydrophobic: neither water nor water-containing substances wet PTFE, as fluorocarbons exhibit only small London dispersion forces due to the low electric polarizability of fluorine. PTFE has one of the lowest coefficients of friction of any solid.

Polytetrafluoroethylene is used as a non-stick coating for pans and other cookware. It is non-reactive, partly because of the strength of carbon–fluorine bonds, so it is often used in containers and pipework for reactive and corrosive chemicals. When used as a lubricant, PTFE reduces friction, wear, and energy consumption of machinery. It is used as a coating on catheters, and, in its expanded porous form (ePTFE), as a graft material in surgery and as an implant in cardiac and vascular reconstruction, hernia repair, and facial plastic surgery.

PTFE and chemicals used in its production are some of the best-known and widely applied per- and polyfluoroalkyl substances (PFAS), which are persistent organic pollutants. PTFE occupies more than half of all fluoropolymer production, followed by polyvinylidene fluoride (PVDF).

For decades, DuPont used perfluorooctanoic acid (PFOA, or C8) during production of PTFE, later discontinuing its use due to legal actions over ecotoxicological and health effects of exposure to PFOA. DuPont's spin-off Chemours currently manufactures PTFE using an alternative chemical it calls GenX, another PFAS. Although GenX was designed to be less persistent in the environment compared to PFOA, its effects may be equally harmful or even more detrimental than those of the chemical it has replaced.

== History ==
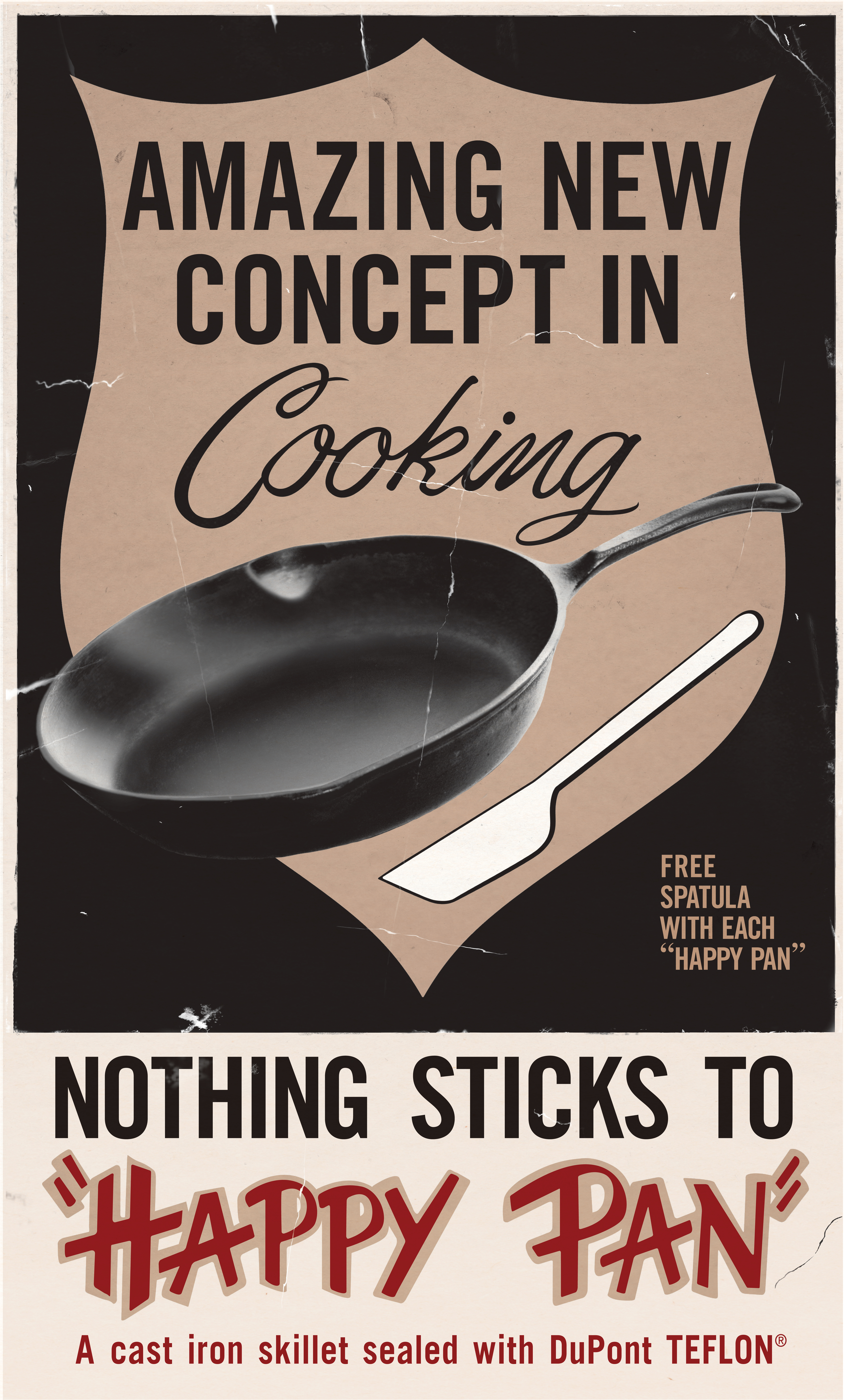
Advertisement of the Happy Pan, a Teflon-coated pan from the 1960s

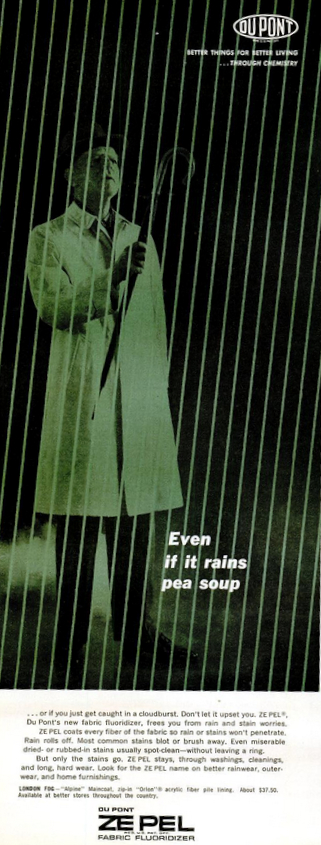
Advertisement for Zepel, the trade name used to market Teflon as a fabric treatment

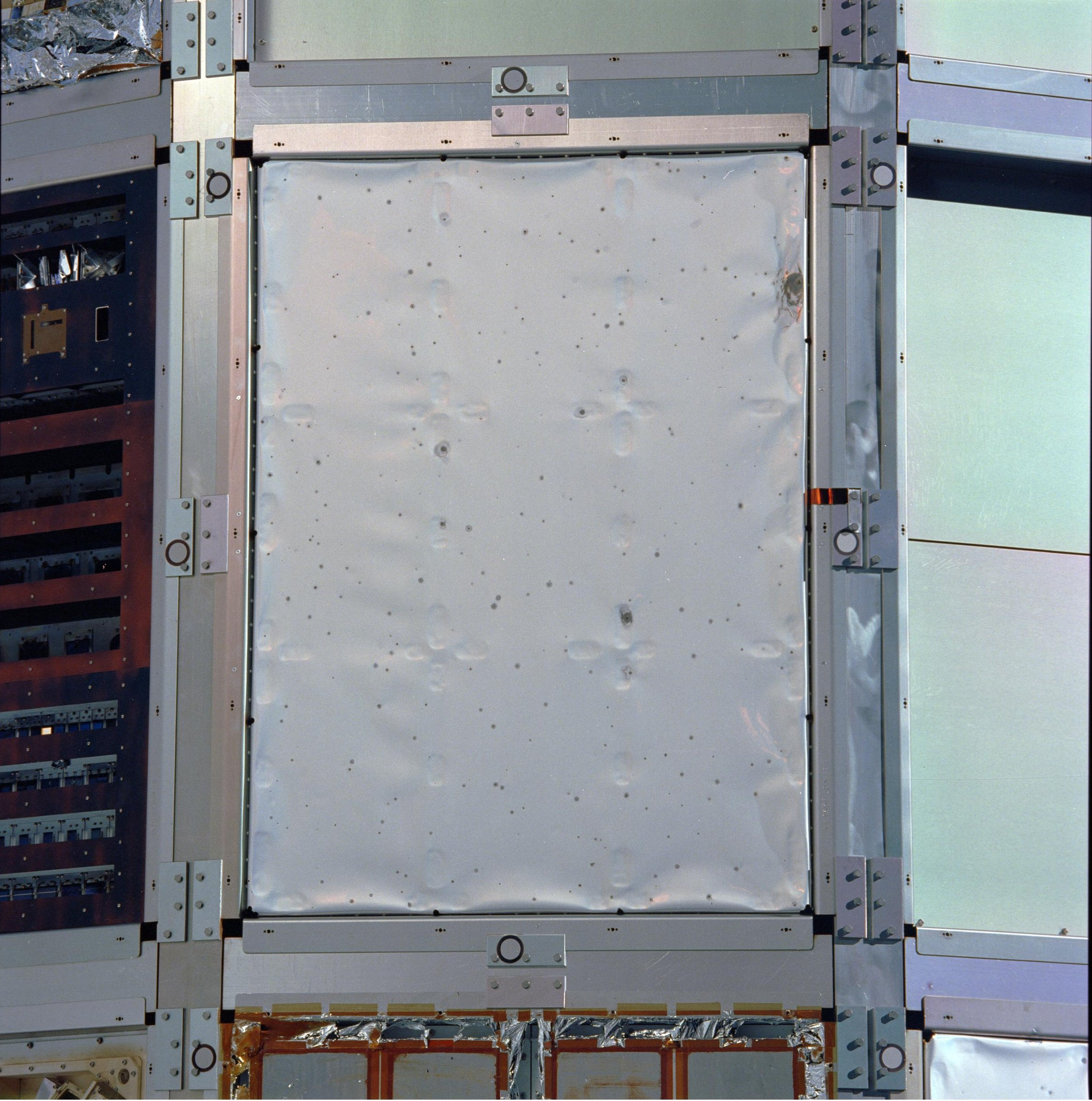
PTFE thermal cover showing impact craters, from NASA's Ultra Heavy Cosmic Ray Experiment (UHCRE) on the Long Duration Exposure Facility (LDEF)

Logo of Teflon, the commonly known brand name of PTFE-based compositions manufactured by Chemours

Polytetrafluoroethylene (PTFE) was accidentally discovered in 1938 by Roy J. Plunkett while he was working in Chemours Chambers Works plant in New Jersey for DuPont. On 6 April 1938, while attempting to make a new chlorofluorocarbon refrigerant, Plunkett and his assistant Jack Reebok found that a cylinder of tetrafluoroethylene (TFE) gas contained a white powder: polytetrafluoroethylene. The gas in its pressure bottle stopped flowing before the bottle's weight had dropped to the point signaling "empty". John J. Beall (chemist), noticing a weight differential in his test cylinder, brought it to the attention of Roy Plunkett. The chemists in the lab sawed the bottle apart and found the bottle's interior coated with a waxy white material that was oddly slippery. Analysis showed that it was polymerized perfluoroethylene, with the iron from the inside of the container having acted as a catalyst at high pressure. Kinetic Chemicals patented the new fluorinated plastic (analogous to the already known polyethylene) in 1941, and registered the Teflon trademark in 1945.

An early use was in the Manhattan Project as a material to coat valves and seals in the pipes holding highly reactive uranium hexafluoride at the vast K-25 uranium enrichment plant in Oak Ridge, Tennessee. By 1948, DuPont, which founded Kinetic Chemicals in partnership with General Motors, was producing over 910,000 kilograms (2,000,000 lb) of Teflon-brand polytetrafluoroethylene per year in Parkersburg, West Virginia.

In 1954, Colette Grégoire urged her husband, the French engineer Marc Grégoire, to try the material he had been using on fishing tackle on her cooking pans. He subsequently created the first PTFE-coated non-stick pans under the brand name Tefal (combining "Tef" from "Teflon" and "al" from aluminium). In the United States, Marion A. Trozzolo, who had been using the substance on scientific utensils, marketed the first US-made PTFE-coated pan, "The Happy Pan", in 1961. Non-stick cookware has since become a common household product, now offered by hundreds of manufacturers across the world.

The brand name Zepel was used to promote its stain resistance and water resistance when applied to fabrics.

In the 1990s, it was found that PTFE could be radiation cross-linked above its melting point in an oxygen-free environment. Electron beam processing is one example of radiation processing. Cross-linked PTFE exhibits enhanced high-temperature mechanical properties and improved radiation stability. That was significant because, for many years, irradiation at ambient conditions has been used to break down PTFE for recycling. This radiation-induced chain scission allows it to be more easily reground and reused.

Corona discharge treatment of the surface to increase the energy and improve adhesion has been reported.

== Production ==
PTFE is produced by free-radical polymerization of tetrafluoroethylene. The net equation is as follows:

n F_{2}C=CF_{2} → −(F_{2}C−CF_{2})_{n}−

Because tetrafluoroethylene can explosively decompose to tetrafluoromethane (CF_{4}) and carbon, a special apparatus is required for the polymerization to prevent hot spots that might initiate this dangerous side reaction. The process is typically initiated with persulfate, such as potassium persulfate and ammonium persulfate, which homolyzes to generate sulfate radicals:

[O_{3}SO−OSO_{3}]^{2−} ⇌ 2 SO^{•−}_{4}

The resulting polymer is terminated with sulfate ester groups, which can be hydrolyzed to give OH end-groups.

Granular PTFE is produced via suspension polymerization, where PTFE is suspended in an aqueous medium primarily via agitation and somewhat commonly with the use of a surfactant. PTFE is also synthesized via emulsion polymerization, where a surfactant is the primary means of keeping PTFE in an aqueous medium. Surfactants in the past have included perfluorooctanoic acid (PFOA) and perfluorooctanesulfonic acid (PFOS). More recently, Perfluoro 3,6 dioxaoctanoic acid (PFO2OA) and FRD-903 (GenX) are being used as alternatives.

== Properties ==
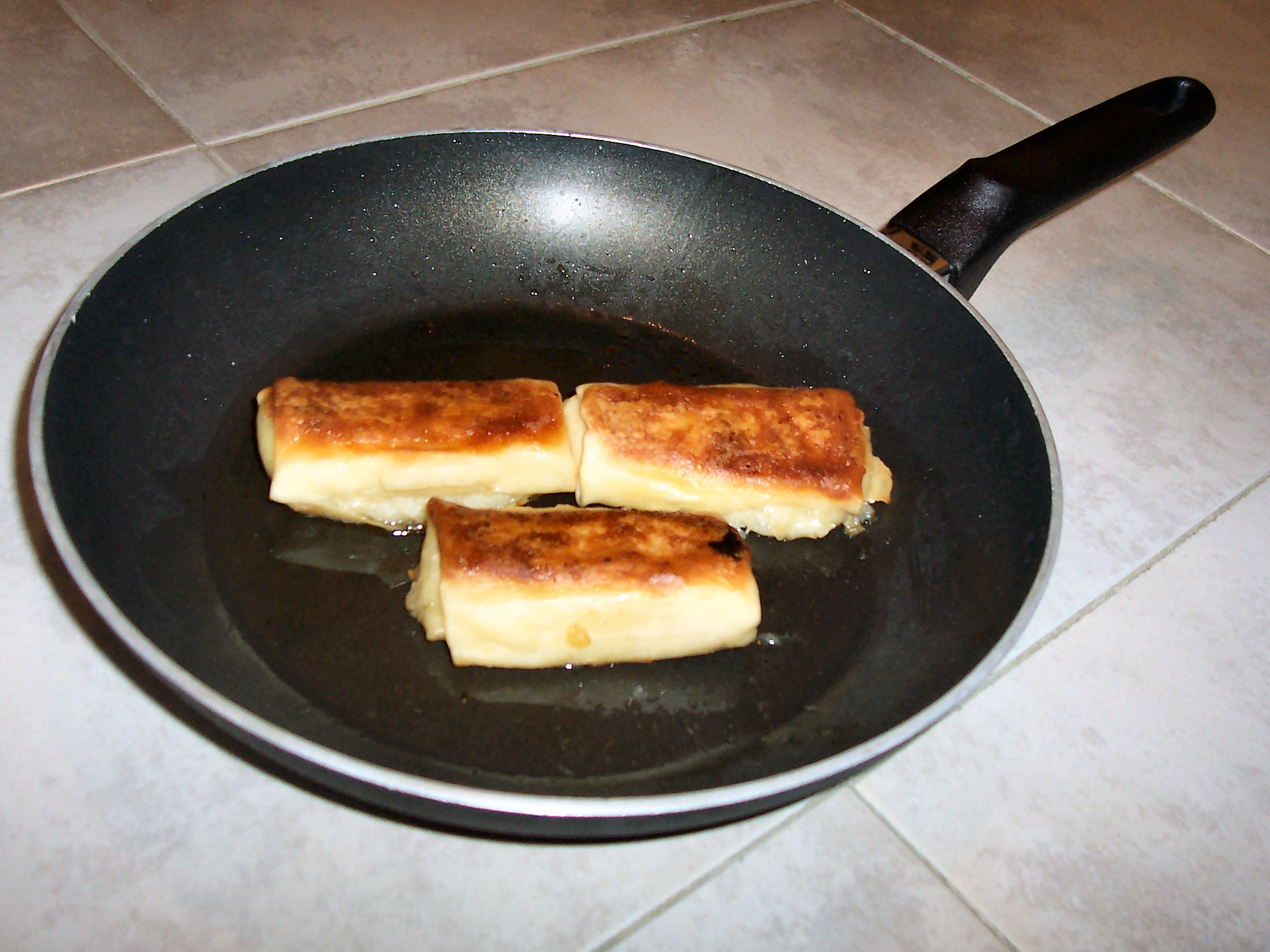
PTFE is often used to coat non-stick pans as it is hydrophobic and possesses fairly high heat resistance.

PTFE is a thermoplastic polymer, which is a white solid at room temperature, with a density of about 2200 kg/m^{3} and a melting point of 600 K (327 °C; 620 °F). It maintains high strength, toughness and self-lubrication at low temperatures down to 5 K (−268.2 °C; −450.7 °F), and good flexibility at temperatures above 194 K (−79.15 °C; −110.5 °F). PTFE gains its properties from the aggregate effect of carbon-fluorine bonds, as do all fluorocarbons. The only chemicals known to affect these carbon-fluorine bonds are highly reactive metals like the alkali metals, at higher temperatures, such metals as aluminium and magnesium, and fluorinating agents such as xenon difluoride and cobalt(III) fluoride. At temperatures above 650–700 °C (1,200–1,290 °F) PTFE undergoes depolymerization. However, it begins to decompose at about 260 °C (500 °F) through 350 °C (662 °F), and pyrolysis occurs at temperatures above 400 °C (752 °F).

Property	Value
Glass temperature	114.85 °C (238.73 °F; 388.00 K)
Thermal expansion	112–125×10^{−6} K^{−1}
Thermal diffusivity	0.124 mm^{2}/s
Young's modulus	0.5 GPa
Yield strength	23 MPa
Coefficient of friction	0.05–0.10
Dielectric constant	ε = 2.1, tan(δ) < 5×10^{−2}
Dielectric constant (60 Hz)	ε = 2.1, tan(δ) < 2×10^{−2}
Dielectric strength (1 MHz)	60 MV/m
Magnetic susceptibility (SI, 22 °C)	−10.28×10^{−6}

The coefficient of friction of plastics is usually measured against polished steel. PTFE's coefficient of friction is 0.05 to 0.10. PTFE's resistance to van der Waals forces means that it is the only known surface to which a gecko cannot stick. In addition, PTFE can be used to prevent insects from climbing up surfaces painted with the material. For example, PTFE is used to prevent ants from climbing out of formicaria. There are surface treatments for PTFE that alter the surface to allow adhesion to other materials.

Because of its chemical and thermal properties, PTFE is often used as a gasket material within industries that require resistance to aggressive chemicals such as pharmaceuticals or chemical processing. However, until the 1990s, PTFE was not known to crosslink like an elastomer, due to its chemical inertness. Therefore, it has no "memory" and is subject to creep. Because of the propensity to creep, the long-term performance of such seals is worse than for elastomers that exhibit zero, or near-zero, levels of creep. In critical applications, Belleville washers are often used to apply continuous force to PTFE gaskets, thereby ensuring a minimal loss of performance over the lifetime of the gasket.

PTFE is an ultraviolet (UV) transparent polymer. However, when exposed to an excimer laser beam, it severely degrades due to heterogeneous photothermal effect and thus can be harmful to human beings.

== Processing ==
Processing PTFE can be difficult and expensive because its high melting temperature, 327 °C (621 °F), is above its decomposition temperature. Even when molten, PTFE does not flow due to its exceedingly high melt viscosity. The viscosity and melting point can be decreased by inclusion of small amount of comonomers such as perfluoro (propylvinyl ether) and hexafluoropropylene (HFP). These cause the otherwise perfectly linear PTFE chain to become branched, reducing its crystallinity.

Some PTFE parts are made by cold-moulding, a form of compression molding. Here, fine powdered PTFE is forced into a mould under high pressure (10–100 MPa). After a settling period, lasting from minutes to days, the mould is heated at 360 to 380 °C (680 to 716 °F), allowing the fine particles to fuse (sinter) into a single mass.

== Applications and uses ==
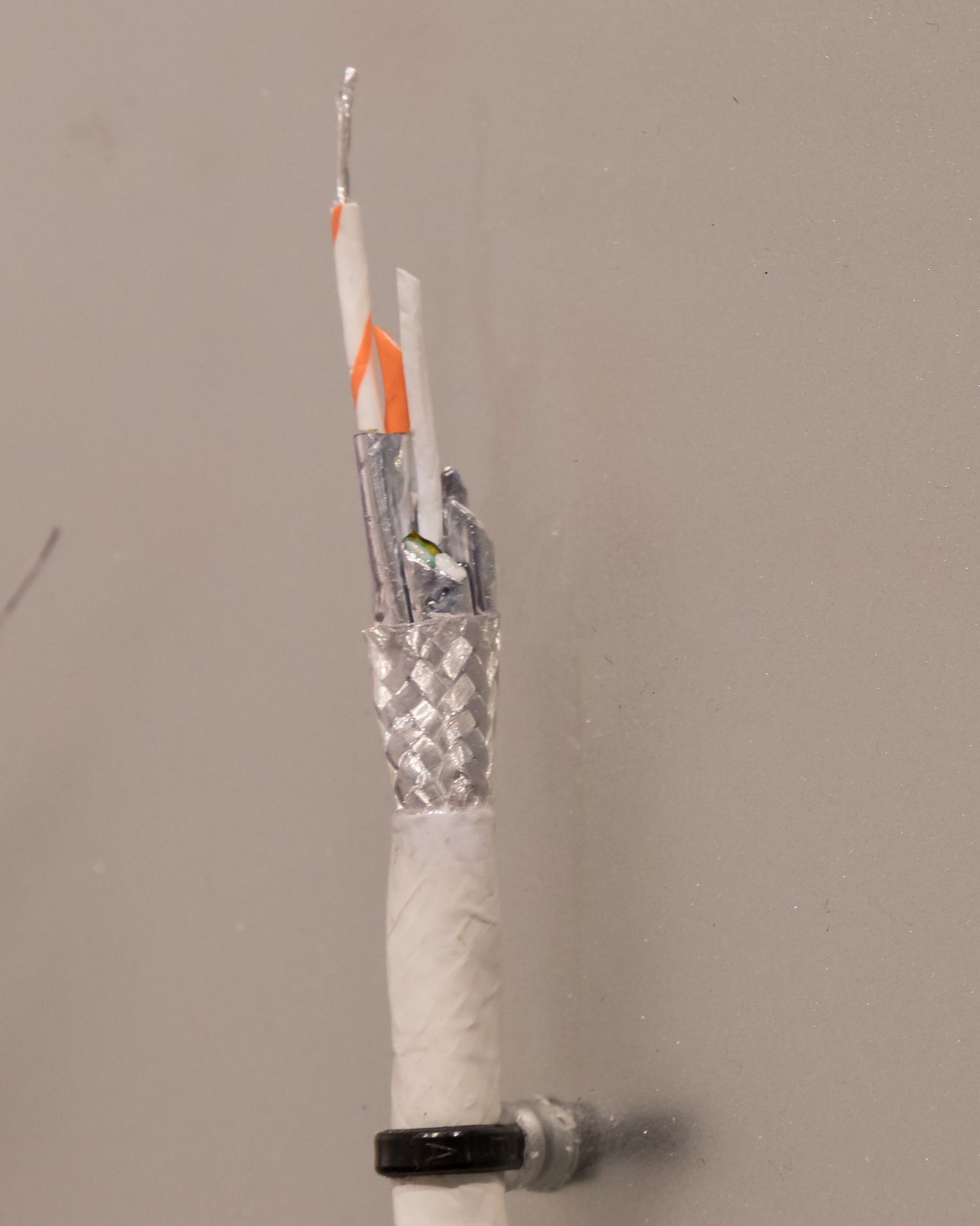
PTFE-jacketed (white) shielded twisted-pair cables

=== Wire insulation, electronics ===
The most common use of PTFE, consuming about 50% of production, is for the insulation of wiring in aerospace and computer applications (e.g. hookup wire, coaxial cables). This application exploits the fact that PTFE has excellent dielectric properties, specifically low group velocity dispersion, especially at high radio frequencies, making it suitable for use as an excellent insulator in connector assemblies and cables, and in printed circuit boards used at microwave frequencies. Combined with its high melting temperature, this makes PTFE the material of choice as a high-performance substitute for the weaker, higher dispersion, and lower-melting-point polyethylene commonly used in low-cost applications.

=== Bearing seals ===
In industrial applications, owing to its low friction, PTFE is used for plain bearings, gears, slide plates, seals, gaskets, bushings, and more applications with sliding action of parts, where it outperforms acetal and nylon.

=== Electrets ===
Its extremely high bulk resistivity makes it an ideal material for fabricating long-life electrets, the electrostatic analogues of permanent magnets.

=== Composites ===
PTFE film is also widely used in the production of carbon fiber composites as well as fiberglass composites, notably in the aerospace industry. PTFE film is used as a barrier between the carbon or fiberglass part being built and, in breather and bagging materials, is used to incapsulate the bondment when debulking (vacuum removal of air from between layers of laid-up plies of material) and when curing the composite, usually in an autoclave. The PTFE, used here as a film, prevents the non-production materials from sticking to the part being built, which is sticky due to the carbon-graphite or fiberglass plies being pre-pregnated with bismaleimide resin. Non-production materials such as Teflon, Airweave Breather, and the bag itself would be considered F.O.D. (foreign object debris/damage) if left in layup.

Gore-Tex is a brand of expanded PTFE (ePTFE), a material incorporating a fluoropolymer membrane with micropores. The roof of the Hubert H. Humphrey Metrodome in Minneapolis, US, was one of the largest applications of PTFE coatings. 20 acres (81,000 m^{2}) of the material was used in the creation of the white double-layered PTFE-coated fiberglass dome.

=== Chemically inert liners ===
Because of its extreme non-reactivity and high temperature rating, PTFE is often used as the liner in hose assemblies, expansion joints, and in industrial pipe lines, particularly in applications using acids, alkalis, or other chemicals. Its frictionless qualities allow improved flow of highly viscous liquids and for uses in applications such as brake hoses.

=== Tensioned membrane structures ===
PTFE architectural membranes are created by coating a woven glass-fibre base cloth with PTFE, forming one of the strongest and most durable materials used in tensile structures. Some notable structures featuring PTFE-tensioned membranes include The O2 Arena in London, Moses Mabhida Stadium in South Africa, Metropolitano Stadium in Spain and the Sydney Football Stadium Roof in Australia.

=== Musical instruments ===
PTFE is often found in musical instrument lubrication products, most commonly valve oil.

PTFE is also used in the fabrication of guitar and bass nut material. PTFE impregnated plastics are sold as "self-lubricating". This allows for the strings to glide through the nut slot grooves more easily preventing binding, known as "stiction", which causes tuning instability. For example, GraphTech Guitar Labs products include nut, saddle and string trees all made of material that is PTFE impregnated. These are particularly useful for guitars equipped with vibrato systems. As the string is pulled back and forth across the nut and saddle by the vibrato system of such an instrument, the lower friction coefficient that PTFE provides is beneficial, allowing the string to return-to-zero back in tune.

=== Lubricants ===
PTFE is used in some aerosol lubricant sprays, including in micronized and polarized form. It is notable for its extremely low coefficient of friction, its hydrophobicity (which serves to inhibit rust), and for the dry film it forms after application, which allows it to resist collecting particles that might otherwise form an abrasive paste. Brands include GT85, Tri-Flow and WD-40 Specialist.

=== Kitchenware ===
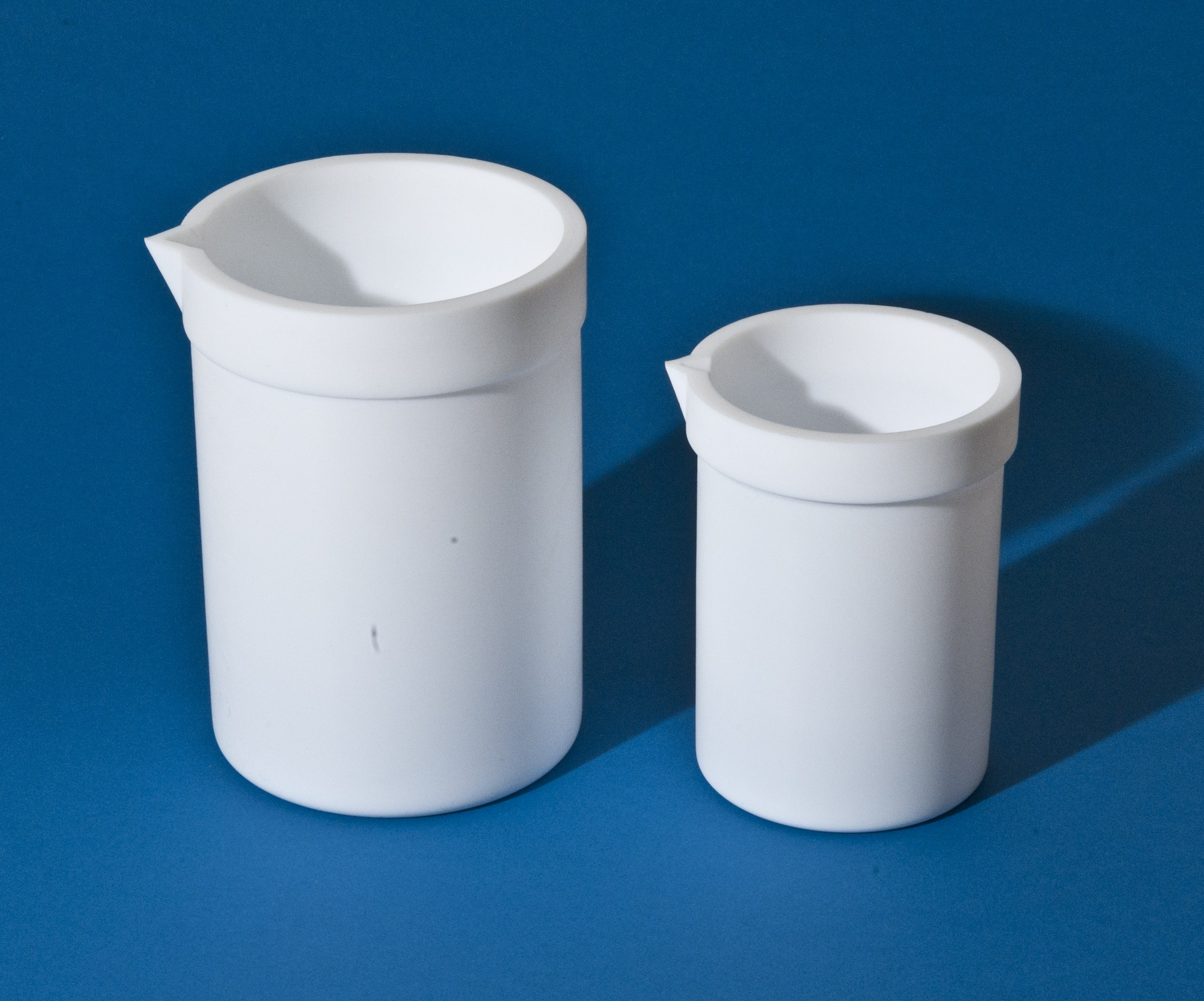
Two molded PTFE jars

PTFE is best known for its use in coating non-stick frying pans and other cookware, as it is hydrophobic and possesses fairly high heat resistance.

The sole plates of some clothes irons are coated with PTFE.

=== Others ===
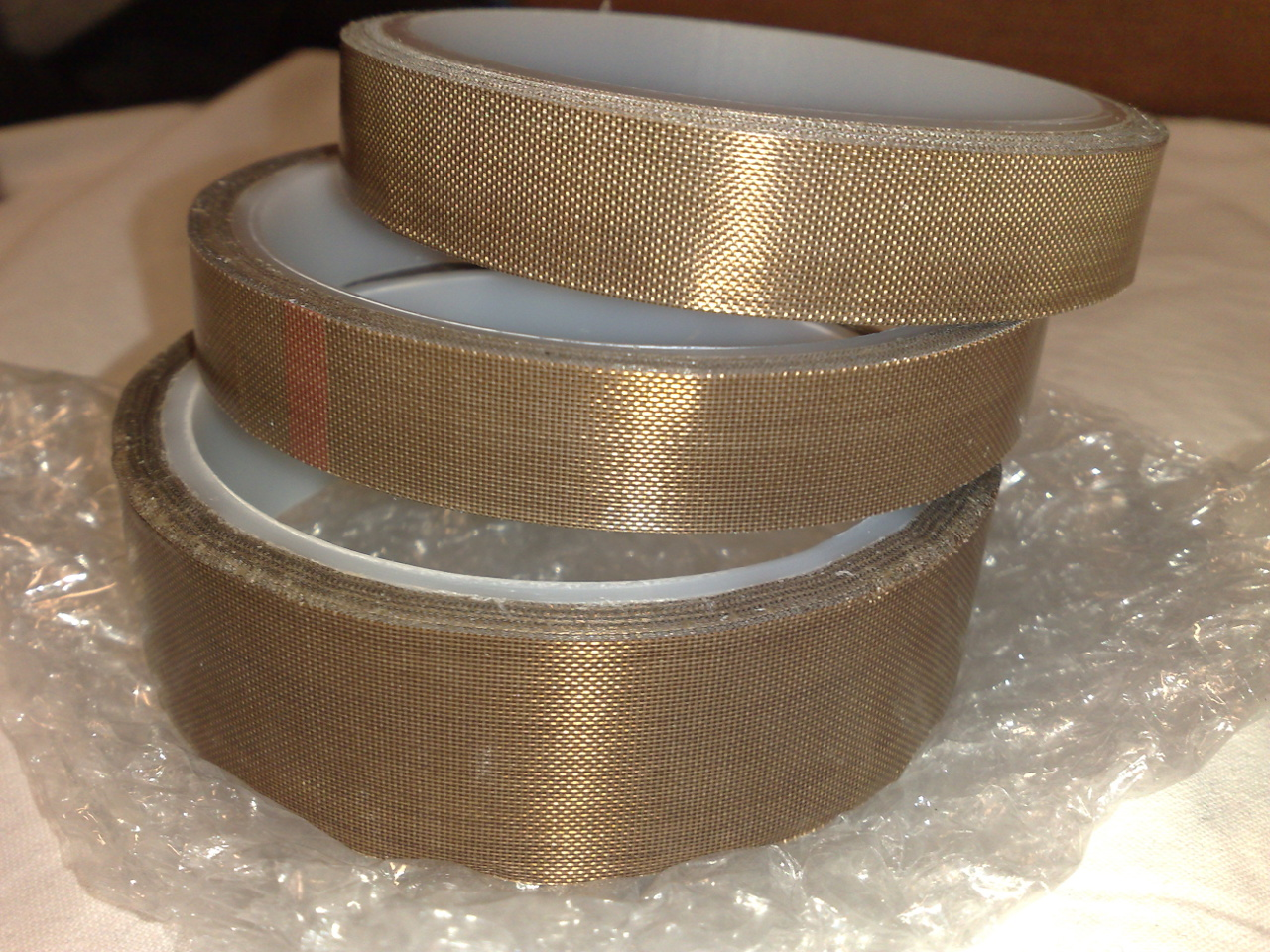
PTFE tapes with pressure-sensitive adhesive backing

Other niche applications include:

- It is used in ski bindings as a non-mechanical AFD (anti-friction device)
- It can be stretched to contain small pores of varying sizes and is then placed between fabric layers to make a waterproof, breathable fabric in outdoor apparel.
- It is used as a fabric protector to repel stains on formal school wear, like uniform blazers.
- It is used as a lubricant to prevent captive insects and other arthropods from escaping.
- It is used as a coating for medical and healthcare applications, formulated to provide strength and heat resistance to surgical devices and other medical equipment.
- It is used as a film interface patch for sports and medical applications, featuring a pressure-sensitive adhesive backing, which is installed in strategic high friction areas of footwear, insoles, ankle-foot orthosis, and other medical devices to prevent and relieve friction-induced blisters, calluses and foot ulceration.
- Expanded PTFE membranes have been used in trials to assist trabeculectomy surgery to treat glaucoma.
- Powdered PTFE is used in pyrotechnic compositions as an oxidizer with powdered metals such as aluminium and magnesium. Upon ignition, these mixtures form carbonaceous soot and the corresponding metal fluoride, and release large amounts of heat. They are used in infrared decoy flares and as igniters for solid-fuel rocket propellants. Aluminium and PTFE is also used in some thermobaric fuel compositions.
- Powdered PTFE is used in a suspension with a low-viscosity, azeotropic mixture of siloxane ethers to create a lubricant for use in twisty puzzles.
- In optical radiometry, sheets of PTFE are used as measuring heads in spectroradiometers and broadband radiometers (e.g., illuminance meters and UV radiometers) due to PTFE's capability to diffuse a transmitting light nearly perfectly. Moreover, the optical properties of PTFE stay constant over a wide range of wavelengths, from UV down to near infrared. In this region, the ratio of its regular transmittance to diffuse transmittance is negligibly small, so light transmitted through a diffuser (PTFE sheet) radiates like Lambert's cosine law. Thus, PTFE enables cosinusoidal angular response for a detector measuring the power of optical radiation at a surface, e.g., in solar irradiance measurements.
- Teflon-coated bullets are coated with PTFE to reduce wear on the rifling of firearms that uncoated projectiles would cause. PTFE itself does not give a projectile an armor-piercing property.
- Its high corrosion resistance makes PTFE useful in laboratory environments, where it is used for lining containers, as a coating for magnetic stirrers, and as tubing for highly corrosive chemicals such as hydrofluoric acid, which will dissolve glass containers. It is used in containers for storing fluoroantimonic acid, a superacid.
- PTFE tubes are used in gas-gas heat exchangers in gas cleaning of waste incinerators. Unit power capacity is typically several megawatts.
- PTFE is widely used as a thread seal tape in plumbing applications, largely replacing paste thread dope.
- PTFE membrane filters are among the most efficient industrial air filters. PTFE-coated filters are often used in dust collection systems to collect particulate matter from air streams in applications involving high temperatures and high particulate loads such as coal-fired power plants, cement production, and steel foundries.
- PTFE grafts can be used to bypass stenotic arteries in peripheral vascular disease if a suitable autologous vein graft is not available.
- Many bicycle lubricants and greases contain PTFE and are used on chains and other moving parts subjected to frictional forces (such as hub bearings).
- PTFE is used for some types of dental floss.
- PTFE can also be used when placing dental fillings, to isolate the contacts of the adjacent tooth so the restorative materials will not stick to the adjacent tooth.
- PTFE sheets are used in the production of butane hash oil due to its non-stick properties and resistance to non-polar solvents.
- PTFE, associated with a slightly textured laminate, makes the plain bearing system of a Dobsonian telescope.
- PTFE is widely used as a non-stick coating for food processing equipment; dough hoppers, mixing bowls, conveyor systems, rollers, and chutes. PTFE can also be reinforced where abrasion is present – for equipment processing seeded or grainy dough, for example.
- PTFE has been experimented with for electroless nickel plating.
- PTFE tubing is used for Bowden tubing in 3D printers because its low friction allows the extruder stepper motor to push filament through it more easily.
- PTFE is commonly used in aftermarket add-on mouse feet for gaming mice to reduce friction of the mouse against the mouse pad, resulting in a smoother glide.
- PTFE foils are commonly used with laser printers everywhere, in their fuser unit, wrapped around the heater element(s), and on the opposite pressure roller to prevent any kind of sticking to it (neither the printed paper nor toner waste)
- PTFE is also used to make body jewellery as it is much safer to wear compared to materials like acrylic.
- PTFE is used to make bookbinding tools for folding, scoring, and separating sheets of paper. These are typically referred to as Teflon bone folders.
- PTFE is commonly used for the tip of desoldering pumps due to its high melting temperature.
- PTFE has been proposed as a zero-calorie food additive to increase satiety.
- In cardiac surgery, specifically for mitral valve repair, prefabricated loops made of PTFE suture material, known as "neochordae", are routinely used due to their mechanical properties. The material ensures high resistance to multiple tractions during these surgical procedures.
- In electrochemical devices, PTFE is used as a hydrophobic binder or coating to control electrode wettability and gas–liquid transport. In carbon dioxide electrolyzers, it can mitigate flooding and alter the local reaction environment, while PTFE-modified porous transport layers in water electrolyzers can facilitate the removal of product-gas bubbles.

== Safety ==
While PTFE is stable at lower temperatures, it begins to deteriorate at temperatures of about 260 °C (500 °F), it decomposes above 350 °C (662 °F), and pyrolysis occurs at temperatures above 400 °C (752 °F). The main decomposition products are fluorocarbon gases and a sublimate, including tetrafluoroethylene (TFE) and difluorocarbene radicals (RCF2).

An animal study conducted in 1955 concluded that it is unlikely that these products would be generated in amounts significant to health at temperatures below 250 °C (482 °F). Above those temperatures the degradation by-products can be lethal to birds, and can cause flu-like symptoms in humans (polymer fume fever), although in humans those symptoms disappear within a day or two of being moved to fresh air.

Most cases of polymer fume fever in humans occur due to smoking PTFE-contaminated tobacco, although cases have occurred in people who have welded near PTFE components. PTFE-coated cookware is unlikely to reach dangerous temperatures with normal use, as meat is usually fried between 204 and 232 °C (399 and 450 °F), and most cooking oils (except refined safflower and avocado oils) start to smoke before a temperature of 260 °C (500 °F) is reached. A 1973 study by DuPont's Haskell Laboratory found that a 4-hour exposure to the fumes emitted by PTFE cookware heated to 280 °C (536 °F) was lethal for parakeets, although that was a higher temperature than the 260 °C (500 °F) required for fumes from pyrolyzed butter to be lethal to the birds.

Perfluorooctanoic acid (PFOA), a chemical formerly used in the manufacture of PTFE products, such as non-stick coated cookware, can be carcinogenic for people who are exposed to it (see Ecotoxicity). Concerning levels of PFOA have been found in the blood of people who work in or live near factories where the chemical is used, and in people regularly exposed to PFOA-containing products, such as some ski waxes and stain-resistant fabric coatings. However, non-stick cookware was not found to be a major source of exposure, as the PFOA is burned off during the manufacturing process and not present in the finished product. However, one 2007 study was able to show that PFOA is not completely removed during the manufacturing process of nonstick cookware. Non-stick coated cookware has not been manufactured using PFOA since 2013, and PFOA is no longer being made in the United States.

== Ecotoxicity ==
=== Living Building Challenge ===
PTFE was added to the Living Building Challenge (LBC) Red List in 2016. The Red List bans substances prevalent in the building industry that pose serious risks to human health and the environment from construction that seeks to meet the criteria of the Living Building Challenge (LBC).

=== Thermal decomposition products ===
Thermolysis of PTFE produces significant amounts of trifluoroacetic acid (TFA) and compounds that degrade to TFA (such as hexafluoropropene), as well as smaller amounts of longer chain (C_{3}–C_{14}) perfluoroalkyl carboxylic acids (PFCAs). Trifluoroacetic acid degrades very slowly in the environment, though its overall ecological risk is still being debated. Long-chain (C_{9}–C_{21}) PFCAs are marked for elimination under the Stockholm Convention on Persistent Organic Pollutants.

=== PFOA ===
Perfluorooctanoic acid (PFOA, or C8) has been used in the manufacture of PTFE as a surfactant during its emulsion polymerization, although several manufacturers have entirely discontinued its use.

PFOA persists indefinitely in the environment. PFOA has been detected in the blood of many individuals of the general US population in the low and sub-parts per billion range, and levels are higher in chemical plant employees and surrounding subpopulations. PFOA and perfluorooctanesulfonic acid (PFOS) have been estimated to be in every American person's blood stream in the parts per billion range, though those concentrations have decreased by 70% for PFOA and 84% for PFOS between 1999 and 2014, which coincides with the end of the production and phase out of PFOA and PFOS in the US. The general population has been exposed to PFOA through massive dumping of C8 waste into the ocean and near the Ohio River Valley. PFOA has been detected in industrial waste, stain-resistant carpets, carpet cleaning liquids, house dust, microwave popcorn bags, water, food and PTFE cookware.

As a result of a class-action lawsuit and community settlement with DuPont, three epidemiologists conducted studies on the population of Parkersburg, West Virginia, surrounding the (former DuPont) Chemours Washington Works chemical plant that was exposed to PFOA at levels greater than in the general population. The studies concluded that there was an association between PFOA exposure and six health outcomes: kidney cancer, testicular cancer, ulcerative colitis, thyroid disease, hypercholesterolemia (high cholesterol), and gestational hypertension (pregnancy-induced high blood pressure).

Overall, PTFE cookware is considered a minor exposure pathway to PFOA.

=== GenX ===
As a result of the lawsuits concerning the PFOA class-action lawsuit, DuPont began to use GenX, a similarly fluorinated compound, as a replacement for perfluorooctanoic acid in the manufacture of fluoropolymers, such as Teflon-brand PTFE. However, the EPA has classified GenX as more toxic than PFOA and it has proven to be a "regrettable substitute"; its effects may be equally harmful or even more detrimental than those of the chemical it was meant to replace.

The chemicals are manufactured by Chemours, a corporate spin-off of DuPont, in Fayetteville, North Carolina. Fayetteville Works was the site where DuPont began manufacture of PFOA after the lawsuit in Parkersburg WV halted their production there. When the EPA asked companies to voluntarily phase out PFOA production, it was replaced by GenX in Fayetteville Works. In June of 2017, The Wilmington Star-News broke the story that GenX was found in the Cape Fear River – the drinking water supply for 500,000 people. The source of the pollution was determined to be the Fayetteville Works site, which had been run by DuPont since its founding in 1971 and then managed by DuPont spinoff, The Chemours Company, since 2015. The water utility indicated they could not filter these chemicals from the drinking water.

The North Carolina Department of Environmental Quality (NC DEQ) records indicate that DuPont started release PFAS into the area beginning in 1976 with the production of Nafion, and that PFAS including GenX had been released as a byproduct of the production of Vinyl Ethers since 1980, exposing the Cape Fear Basin for decades. A small nonprofit called Cape Fear River Watch sued NC DEQ for not taking swifter and stronger action, and sued the polluter, Chemours, for violations of the Clean Water Act and the Toxic Substances Control Act. The result was a Consent Order, signed February 25, 2019, by Cape Fear River Watch, NC DEQ, and Chemours. The order has required Chemours to stop wastewater discharge, air emissions, groundwater discharge, provide sampling and filtration options to well users, and required sampling that proved there were upwards of 300 distinct PFAS compounds being released from Fayetteville Works.

== Similar polymers ==
Teflon is also used as the trade name for a polymer with similar properties, perfluoroalkoxy polymer resin (PFA).

The Teflon trade name is also used for other polymers with similar compositions:

- Perfluoroalkoxy alkane (PFA)
- Fluorinated ethylene propylene (FEP)

These retain the useful PTFE properties of low friction and nonreactivity, but are also more easily formable. For example, FEP is softer than PTFE and melts at 533 K (260 °C; 500 °F); it is also highly transparent and resistant to sunlight.

== See also ==
- BS 4994, PTFE as a thermoplastic lining for dual laminate chemical process plant equipment
- Dark Waters, a film about litigation related to PFOA
- The Devil We Know, documentary on PFOA's health and environmental effects
- ETFE
- Gore-Tex waterproof fabric
- Magnesium/Teflon/Viton, pyrolant thermite composition
- Polymer adsorption
- Superhydrophobic coating
- Surface treatment of PTFE
