= Lithium naphthalenide =

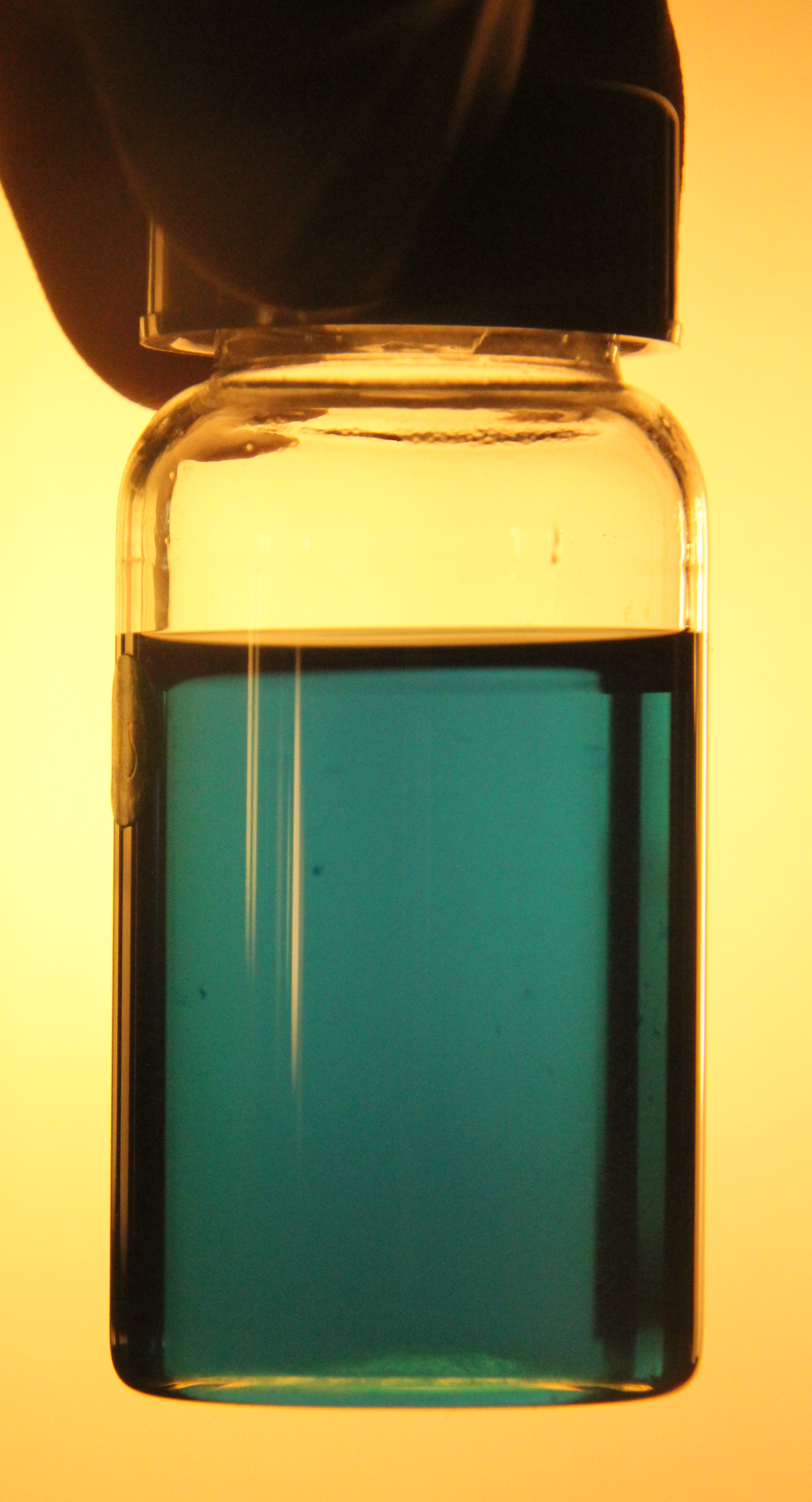
- A solution of lithium naphthalenide in tetrahydrofuran

Names
- Preferred IUPAC name Lithium naphthalenide
- Other names LN

Identifiers
CAS Number	14474-59-0
3D model (JSmol)	Interactive image
ChemSpider	9172277
PubChem CID	57466756
- InChI: InChI=1S/C10H8.Li/c1-2-6-10-8-4-3-7-9(10)5-1;/h1-8H; Key: PDZGAEAUKGKKDE-UHFFFAOYSA-N
- SMILES: [Li].C1=CC=C2C=CC=CC2=C1

Properties
Chemical formula	Li^{+}[C_{10}H_{8}]^{−}
Molar mass	135.11 g·mol^{−1}
Appearance	Dark green crystals
Solubility	Soluble in ether, benzene, THF

Related compounds
Other cations	sodium naphthalenide
- Except where otherwise noted, data are given for materials in their standard state (at 25 °C [77 °F], 100 kPa). Infobox references

Lithium naphthalenide is an organic salt with the chemical formula Li^{+}[C_{10}H_{8}]^{−}. In the research laboratory, it is used as a reductant in the synthesis of organic, organometallic, and inorganic chemistry. It is usually generated in situ. Lithium naphthalene crystallizes with ligands bound to Li^{+}. The anion is a well-known example of an organic radical.

== Preparation and properties ==
The compound is prepared by stirring the metallic lithium with naphthalene in an ethereal solvent, usually as tetrahydrofuran or dimethoxyethane. The resulting salt is dark green. The reaction of naphthalene with lithium can be accelerated by sonication. Methods for assaying lithium naphthalene have been developed as well. As a radical, its solutions show a strong EPR signal near g = 2.0. Its deep green color arises from absorptions at 463 and 735 nm.

Several solvates of lithium naphthalene have been characterized by X-ray crystallography. The effects are subtle, the outer pair of HC–CH bonds contract by 3 pm and the other nine C–C bonds elongate by 2–3 pm. Net reduction weakens the bonding.

== Reactions ==
=== Reductant ===
With a reduction potential near −2.5 V versus the normal hydrogen electrode, the naphthalene radical anion is a strong reducing agent. Lithium naphthalene has often been used to cleave carbon-heteroatom bonds.

=== Protonation ===
The anion is strongly basic, and a typical degradation pathway involves reaction with water and related protic sources such as alcohols. These reactions give dihydronaphthalene:

2 Li^{+}[C_{10}H_{8}]^{−} + 2 H_{2}O → C_{10}H_{10} + C_{10}H_{8} + 2 LiOH

=== As a ligand precursor ===
Alkali metal salts of the naphthalene radical anion are used to prepare complexes of naphthalene.

== Related compounds ==
Many related radical anions are known such as those derived from anthracene, with other alkali metals (especially sodium), and with diverse ligands attached to the alkali metal cations such as [Li^{+}(tmeda)_{2}]_{2}[C_{10}H_{8}]^{2−}.
