= Dialin =

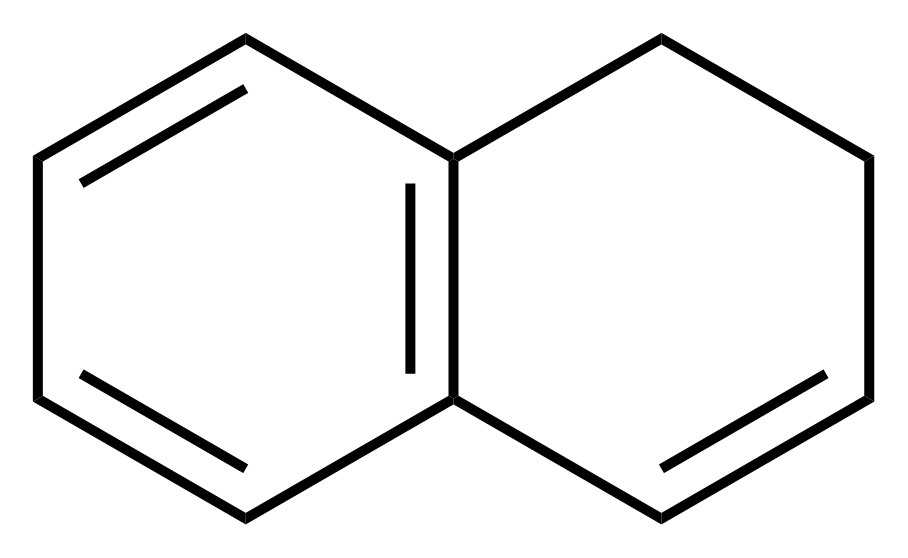

Names
- Preferred IUPAC name 1,2-Dihydronaphthalene
- Other names Bicyclo[4.4.0]deca-1,3,5,7-tetraene; Δ1-Dialin; 1,2-Dialin

Identifiers
CAS Number	447-53-0
3D model (JSmol)	Interactive image
ChEBI	CHEBI:38142
ChemSpider	9550
ECHA InfoCard	100.006.532
PubChem CID	9938
UNII	C765E5F653
CompTox Dashboard (EPA)	DTXSID30858713
- InChI: InChI=1S/C10H10/c1-2-6-10-8-4-3-7-9(10)5-1/h1-3,5-7H,4,8H2 Key: KEIFWROAQVVDBN-UHFFFAOYSA-N
- SMILES: c2ccc1c(C=CCC1)c2

Properties
Chemical formula	C_{10}H_{10}
Molar mass	130.190 g·mol^{−1}
Appearance	Colorless to pale yellow or yellow-green liquid
Density	0.993 g/cm^{3}
Melting point	−8.5 °C (16.7 °F; 264.6 K)
Boiling point	210 °C (410 °F; 483 K) (some decomp.)
Magnetic susceptibility (χ)	−85.1·10^{−6} cm^{3}/mol
- Except where otherwise noted, data are given for materials in their standard state (at 25 °C [77 °F], 100 kPa). verify (what is ?) Infobox references

Dialin (1,2-dihydronaphthalene) is a hydrocarbon with the chemical formula C_{10}H_{10}. It is related to naphthalene by the addition of two H atoms. It is a colorless oil. The compound can be prepared by dehydration of 1,2,3,4-tetrahydro-1-naphthol.

== Related compounds ==
- Naphthalene
- Tetralin
- Decalin
- 1,4-Dihydronaphthalene (registry number 612-17-9), an isomer of 1,2-Dihydronaphthalene
