= Pnictogen-substituted tetrahedranes =

Pnictogen-substituted tetrahedranes are pnictogen-containing analogues of tetrahedranes with the formula R_{x}C_{x}Pn_{4−x} (Pn = N, P, As, Sb, Bi). Computational work has indicated that the incorporation of pnictogens to the tetrahedral core alleviates the ring strain of tetrahedrane. Although theoretical work on pnictogen-substituted tetrahedranes has existed for decades, only the phosphorus-containing species have been synthesized. These species exhibit novel reactivities, most often through ring-opening and polymerization pathways. Phosphatetrahedranes are of interest as new retrons for organophosphorus chemistry. Their strain also make them of interest in the development of energy-dense compounds.

== History ==
Tetra-tert-butyltetrahedrane (^{t}Bu_{4}C_{4}) was reported in 1978 by Maier and coworkers Other Platonic solid species, like cubane and dodecahedrane had been reported by that time. As of 2023, the unencumbered tetrahedrane (H_{4}C_{4}) has yet to be synthesized.

The substitution of carbons in the tetrahedrane core is implicit by the stability of white phosphorus and yellow arsenic. Mixed tetrahedral pnictogen molecules include AsP_{3} and (PbBi_{3})^{−}. Elements on the extreme ends of the pnictogen family have not yet been observed in a tetrahedral Pn_{4} configuration, however. Nitrogen's orbitals lack diffusivity, and bismuth’s orbitals undergo minimal hybridization due to relativistic contraction.

Computational studies into mixed pnictogen-tetrel tetrahedranes have suggested that pnictogen-substituted tetrahedranes are more stable than their all tetrel counterparts decades before their first synthesis.

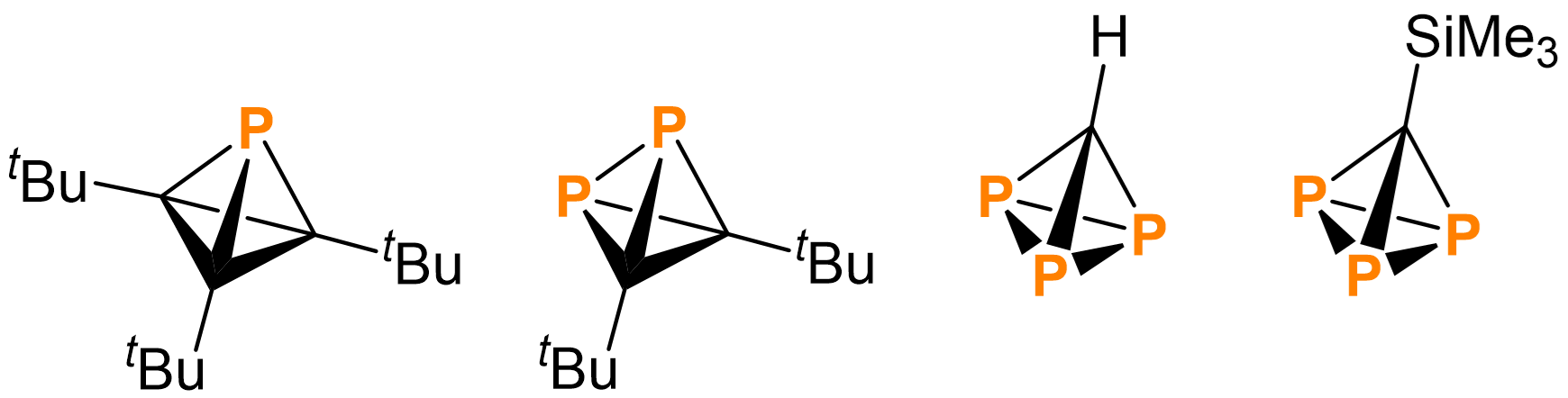
Pnictogen-substituted tetrahedranes

In 2019, Wolf and coworkers synthesized di-tert-butyldiphosphatetrahedrane (^{t}Bu_{2}C_{2}P_{2}) by the reaction of nickel catalyst with phosphaalkynes. In 2020, Cummins and coworkers announced tri-tert-butylmonophosphatetrahedrane (^{t}Bu_{3}C_{3}P). In 2021, Cummins and coworkers published the synthesis of triphosphatetrahedrane (HCP_{3}), completing the set of tetrahedral molecules with carbon- and phosphorus-containing cores.

== Phosphatetrahedrane Synthesis ==
Despite the similarities of their structures, the syntheses of phosphatetrahedranes differ sharply.

=== Tri-tert-butylmonophosphatetrahedrane ===
^{t}Bu_{3}C_{3}P was prepared by the reaction of tri-tert-butyl cyclopropenium with the triphenylborane adduct of an "P^{-}" equivalent.

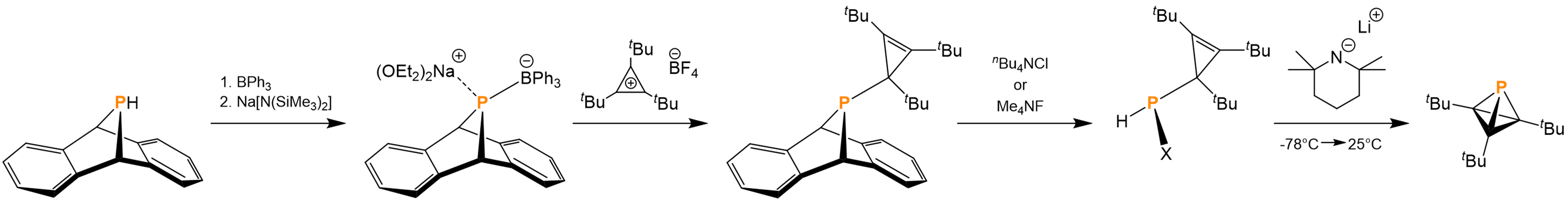
Synthesis of tri-tert-butylmonophosphatetrahedrane with anthracene leaving group.

An improved synthesis was improved with alternative sources of "P^{-}" equivalent.

=== Di-tert-butyldiphosphatetrahedrane ===
In 2019, Wolf and coworkers reported the synthesis of ^{t}Bu_{2}C_{2}P_{2} through the use of a metal catalyst. Ni(IPr)(CO)_{3}, upon addition of 1 equivalent of tert-butylphosphaacetylene (^{t}BuCP), loses two carbon monoxide ligands. The addition of a second equivalent of ^{t}BuCP generates the 1,3-diphosphacyclobutadiene ligand, now binding with η^{4} hapticity. Density functional theory calculations into the catalytic cycle suggest that the 1,3-diphosphacyclobutadiene isomerizes into the desired tetrahedrane. Upon addition of a final ^{t}BuCP, (^{t}Bu_{2}C_{2}P_{2}) is released and the catalytic cycle can begin again.

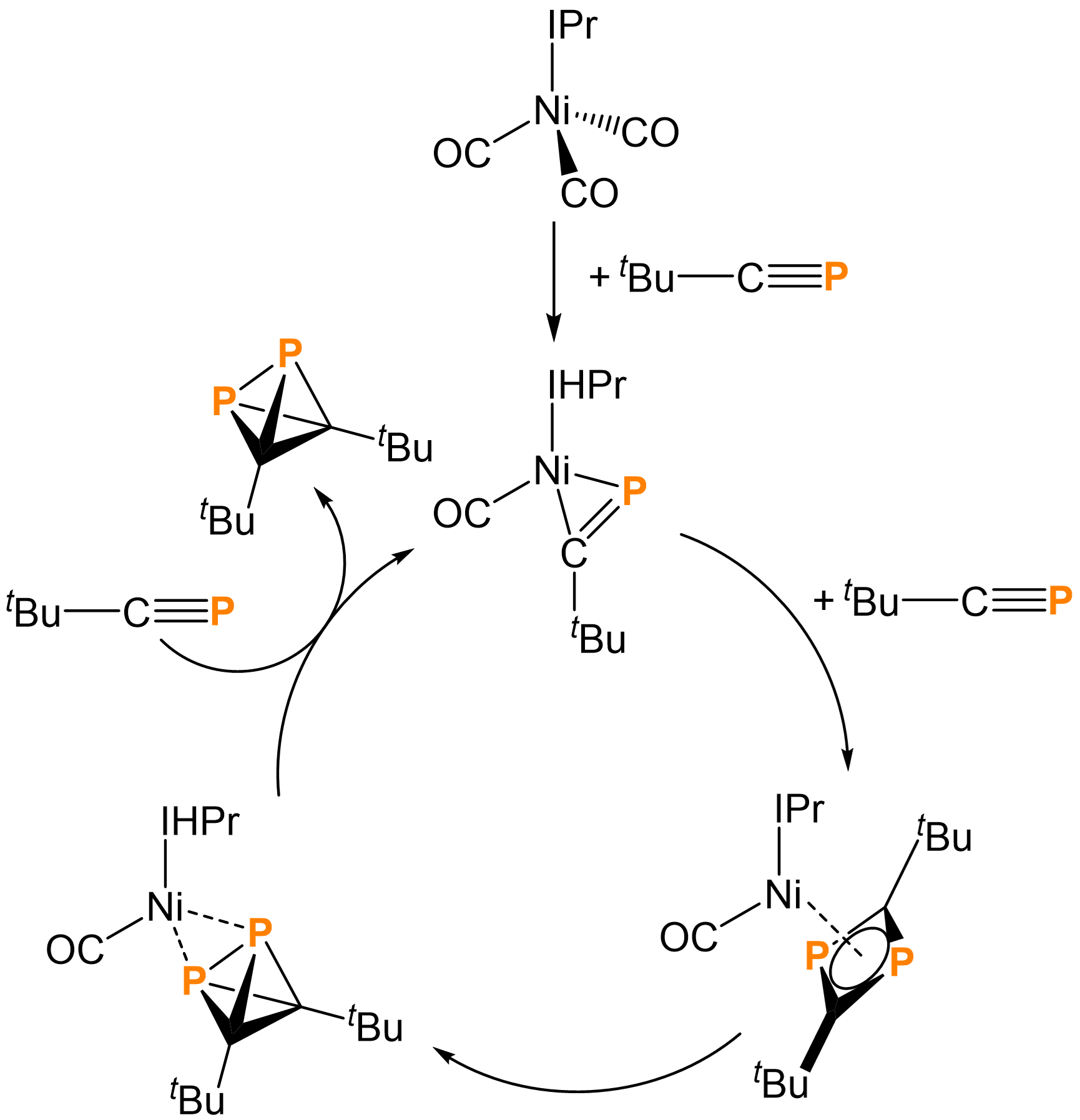
Synthesis of di-tert-diphosphatetrahedrane.

=== Triphosphatetrahedrane ===
Cummins and coworkers reported the synthesis of HCP_{3} in 2021. Due to the similarity of HCP_{3} to AsP_{3}, the [Nb^{II}(ODipp)_{3}(P_{3})]^{−} previously shown to be a retron for AsP_{3} was used for the synthesis of HCP_{3}. To add a -CH group to [P_{3}]^{3-}, bromodichloromethane undergoes halogen abstraction, leaving a carbon-centered radical. The niobium complex then undergoes P_{3} transfer to yield HCP_{3}. The use of bromodichloromethyl trimethylsilane instead of bromodichloromethane in this process yields trimethylsilyl triphosphatetrahedrane ((Me_{3}S)CP_{3}).

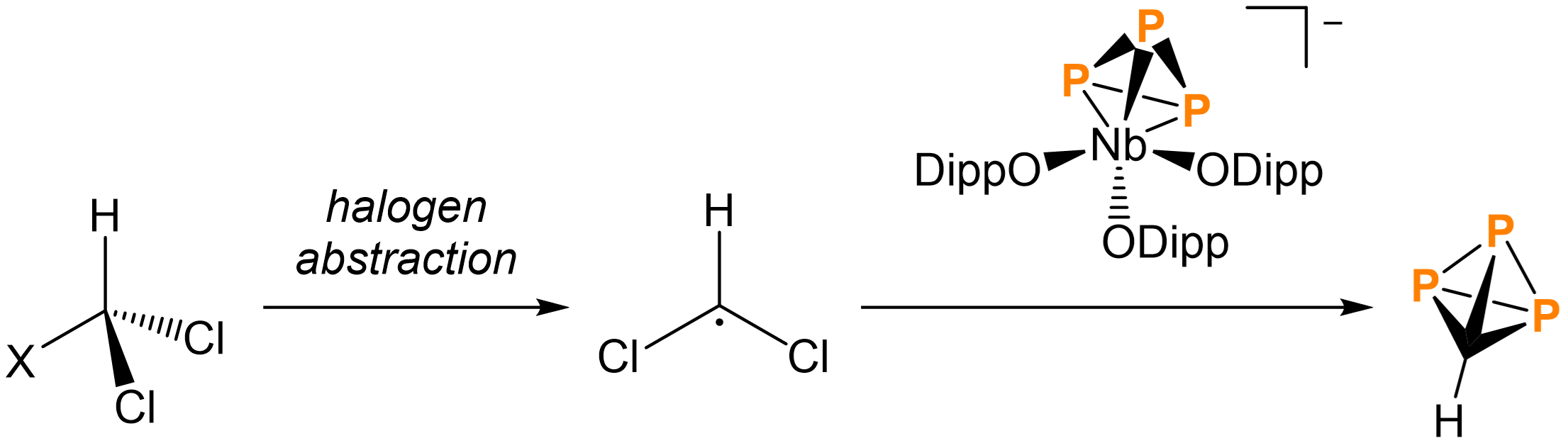
Synthesis of triphosphatetrahedrane.

== Reactivity ==
=== Tri-tert-butylmonophosphatetrahedrane ===
==== Lewis Acid-Induced Reactions ====
Addition of W(CO)_{5}(THF) to ^{t}Bu_{3}C_{3}P generates a phosphorus-containing housene analogue.

The addition of 0.2 equivalents of triphenylborane in benzene can produce several cycloadducts. In the absence of exogenous reagents, ^{t}Bu_{3}C_{3}P dimerizes into a ladderane-like compound with a P-P bond. In the presence of excess styrene or an atmosphere of ethylene, [4 + 2] cycloadditions occur to give 1-phosphabicyclo[2.2.0]hexenes.

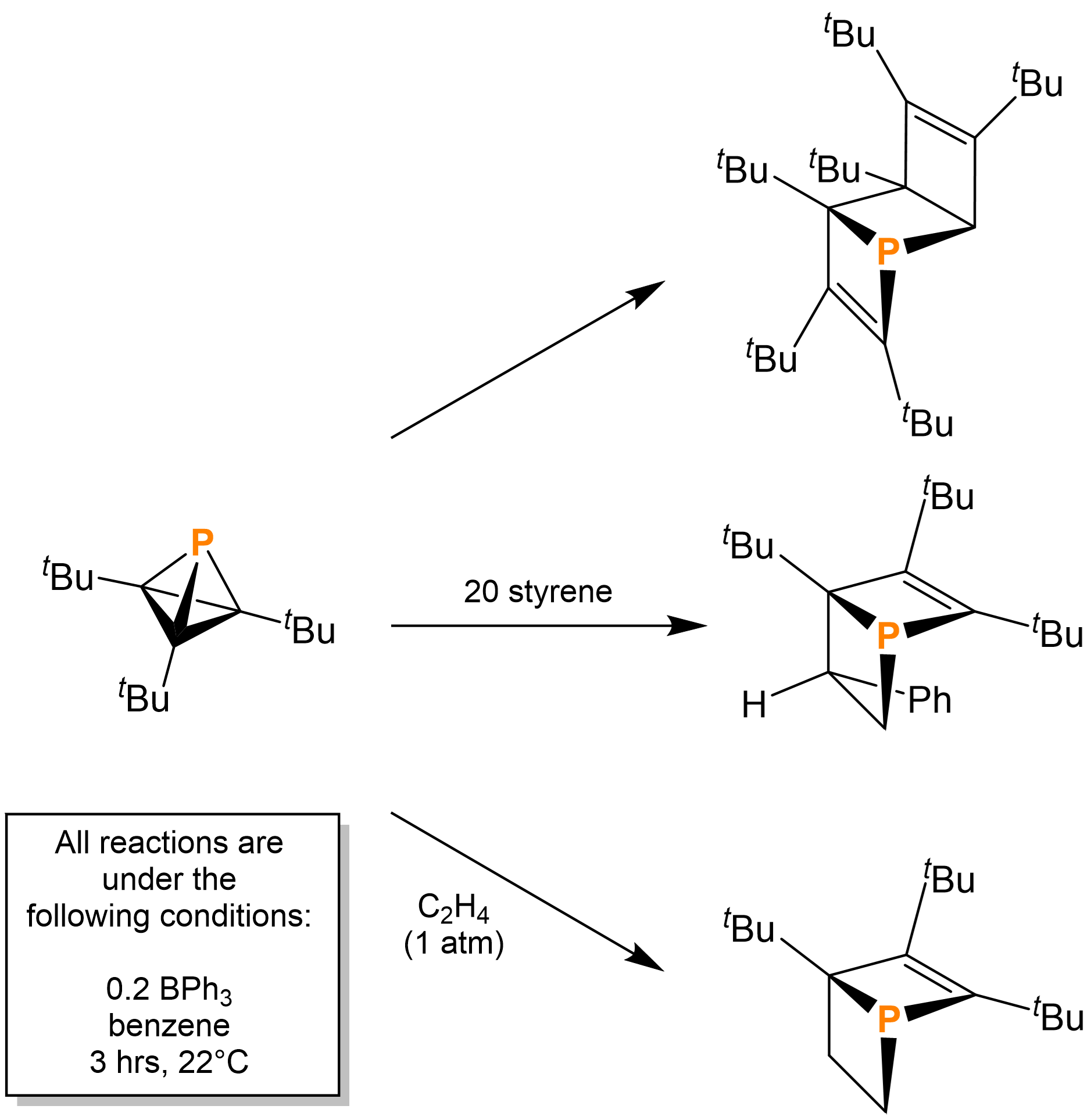
Lewis acid-induced reactions of triphosphatetrahedranes.

==== Silylene Reaction ====
The cage opening of ^{t}Bu_{3}C_{3}P can be induced by PhC(N^{t}Bu)_{2}SiN(SiMe_{3})_{2} over the course of 24 hours to generate the dark red phosphasilene PhC(N^{t}Bu)_{2}Si=P(^{t}Bu_{3}C_{3}).

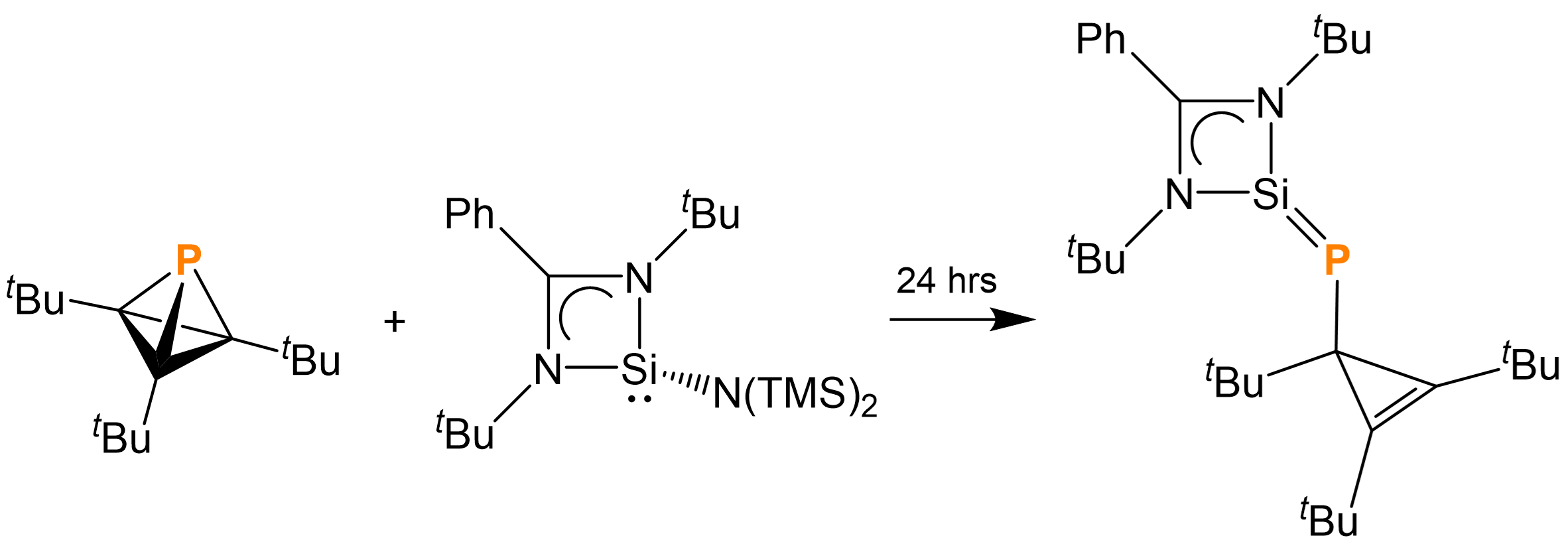
Monophosphatetrahedrane reaction with silylene.

==== Ylide Reaction ====
Reaction of ^{t}Bu_{3}C_{3}P with the ylide Ph_{3}P=CH_{2} over 48 hours and with heat induces cage opening in the same manner as the silylene reaction to generate H_{2}C=P(^{t}BuC)_{3}. Reaction of this product with ^{t}Bu_{3}C_{3}P generates the symmetric product (^{t}BuC)_{3}P(C)P(^{t}BuC)_{3}.

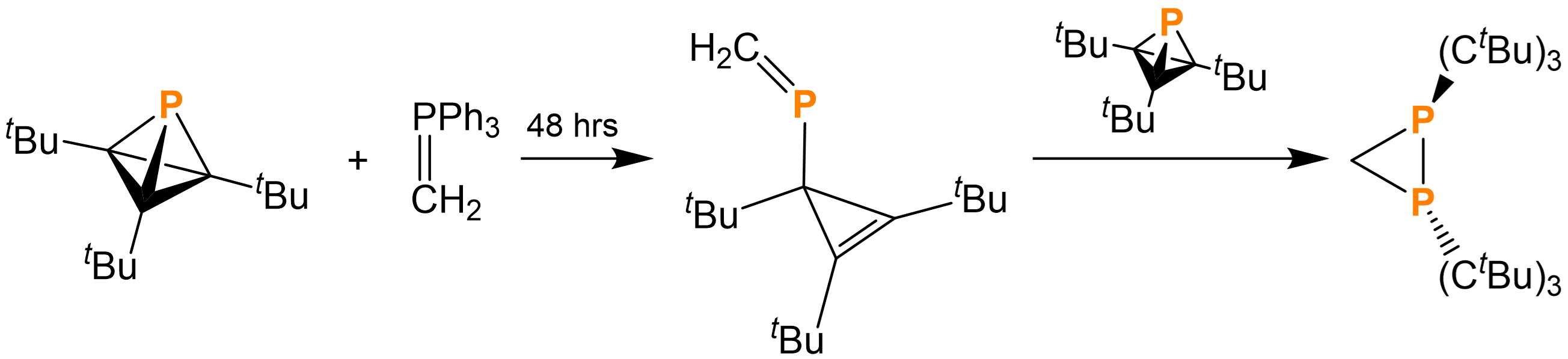
Monophosphatetrahedrane reaction with Ph_{3}P=CH_{2} ylide.

==== Formation of Phosphirane ====
^{t}Bu_{3}C_{3}P is a retron for phosphirane synthesis. Upon reaction with Ni(COD)_{2} (COD = cycloocta-1,5-diene) catalyst in triisopropylphosphine, cage opening occurs. Like the silylene and ylide reactions, the phosphorus bridges the (^{t}BuC)_{3} and the alkene components. The phosphate undergoes cycloaddition with the double bond to form the phosphirane moiety. This reaction pathway has been demonstrated for styrene, ethylene, and neohexene. Furthermore, this reaction pathway is also capable of synthesizing vinyl-substituted phosphirane as evidenced by ^{t}Bu_{3}C_{3}P and cyclohexa-1,3-diene.

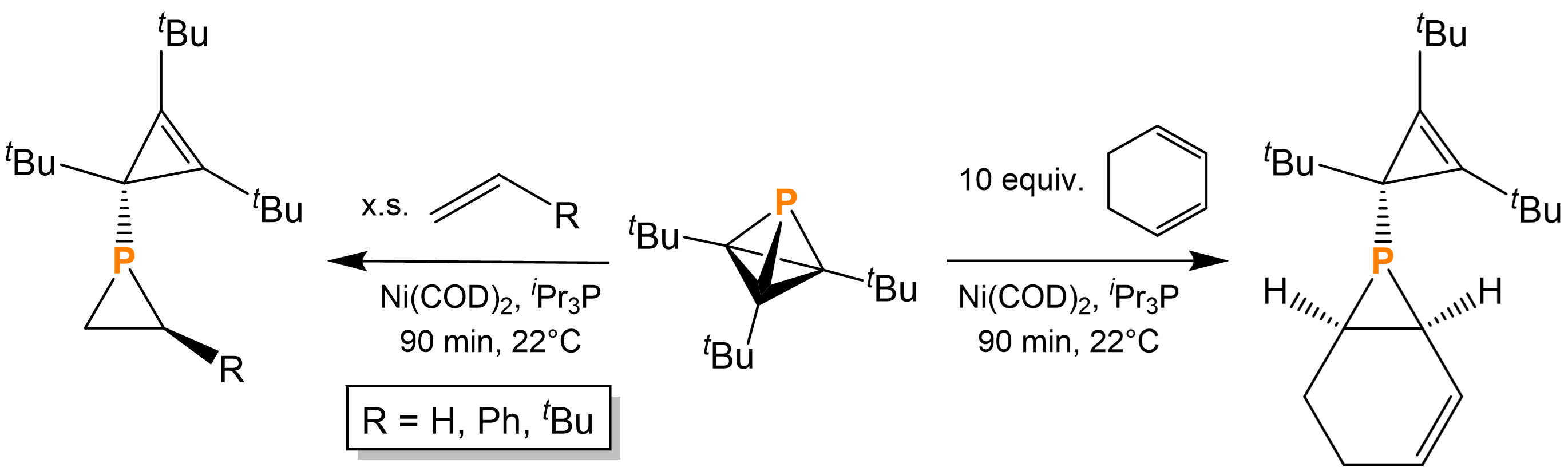
Formation of phosphiranes from monophosphatetrahedrane.

==== Ligand Substitution ====
^{t}Bu_{3}C_{3}P can be used to replace the ethylene ligand of (Ph_{3}P)Pt(C_{2}H_{4}) in melting THF.

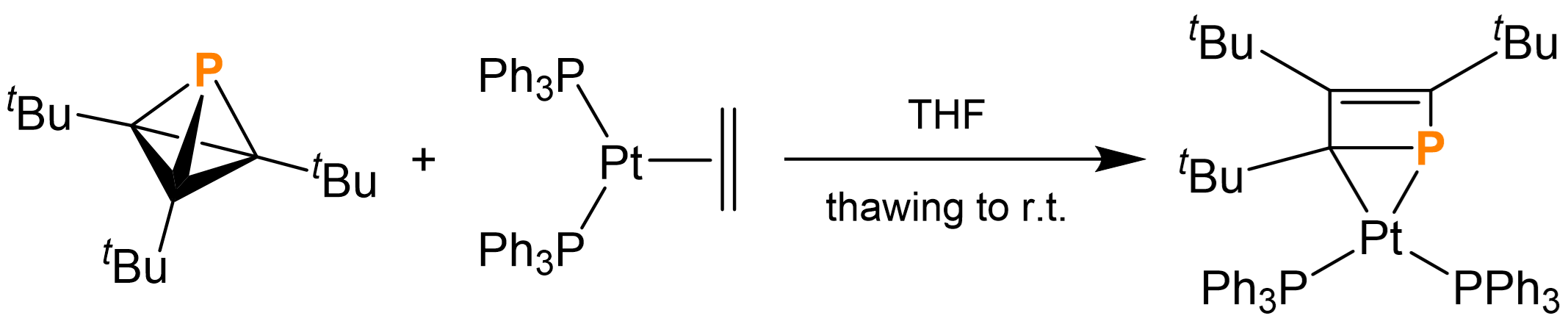
Monophosphatetrahedrane substitutes an ethylene ligand.

=== Di-tert-butyldiphosphatetrahedrane ===
==== Dimerization Reactions ====
Above the melting point of ^{t}Bu_{2}C_{2}P_{2} (–32 °C), ^{t}Bu_{2}C_{2}P_{2} dimerizes into another ladderane-like structure but it is prone to decomposition. This reaction can be hampered by keeping ^{t}Bu_{2}C_{2}P_{2} under its melting point and/or by keeping the ^{t}Bu_{2}C_{2}P_{2} concentration low.

^{t}Bu_{2}C_{2}P_{2} can also be dimerized using nickel complexes to form a variety of exotic structures. ^{t}Bu_{2}C_{2}P_{2} reacted with 1 equivalent of Ni(Cp^{R})(IPr) (IPr = 1,3-bis(2,6-diisopropylphenyl)imidazolin-2-ylidene, R = H, CH_{3}, 4-(CH_{3}CH_{2})-C_{6}H_{4}) generates 0.5 equivalent of a tetracyclo-compound. Upon addition of another equivalent of the same nickel complex, a butterfly-like geometry is adopted, with two nickel atoms coordinated to opposite phosphorus atoms and two coordinated to adjacent phosphorus atoms on different four membered rings. This butterfly-structured compound is a dark red color. The reaction to the butterfly structure is believed to depend on kinetic access to the middle P-P bond. Bulky substituents on Cp^{R} kinetically hinder the P-P bond cleavage and transformation into the butterfly-structured product.

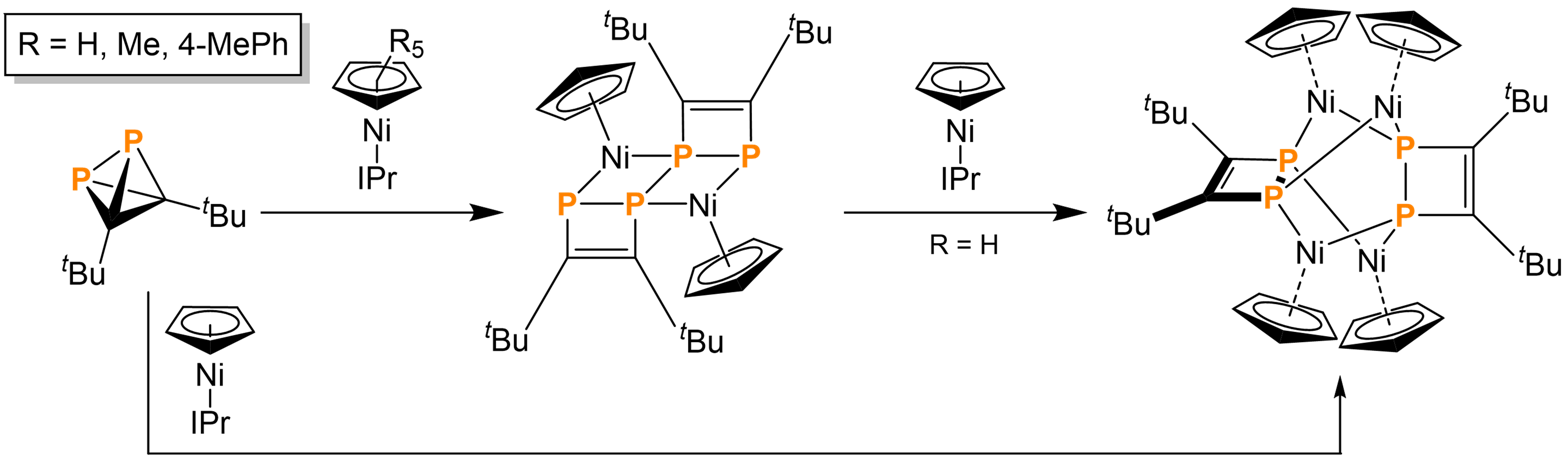
Stepwise dimerization of diphosphatetrahedrane with Ni(Cp)(IPr).

^{t}Bu_{2}C_{2}P_{2} can also be reacted with Ni(IMes)_{2} (IMes = 1,3-bis(2,4,6-trimethylphenyl)imidazolin-2-ylidene) in toluene to produce 0.5 equivalents of an asymmetric compound with two hexacoordinate Ni atoms, a Ni-Ni bond, and two weak P-P interactions. This product is an intermediate for further chemistry. Heating the product at 60 °C for 3 hours causes the expulsion of a di-tert-butylacetylene and the reformation of P-P bonds. Another reaction pathway involves the addition of 3 equivalents of CO to the product, leading to the production of Ni(IMes)(CO)_{3} and the ladderane-like compound described at the beginning of this section. A third reaction pathway involves the addition of hexachloroethane. This produces a 1,2-diphosphocyclobutadiene ring (vide supra) that is coordinated to both nickel atoms. This third reaction pathway also produces the ladderane analogue.

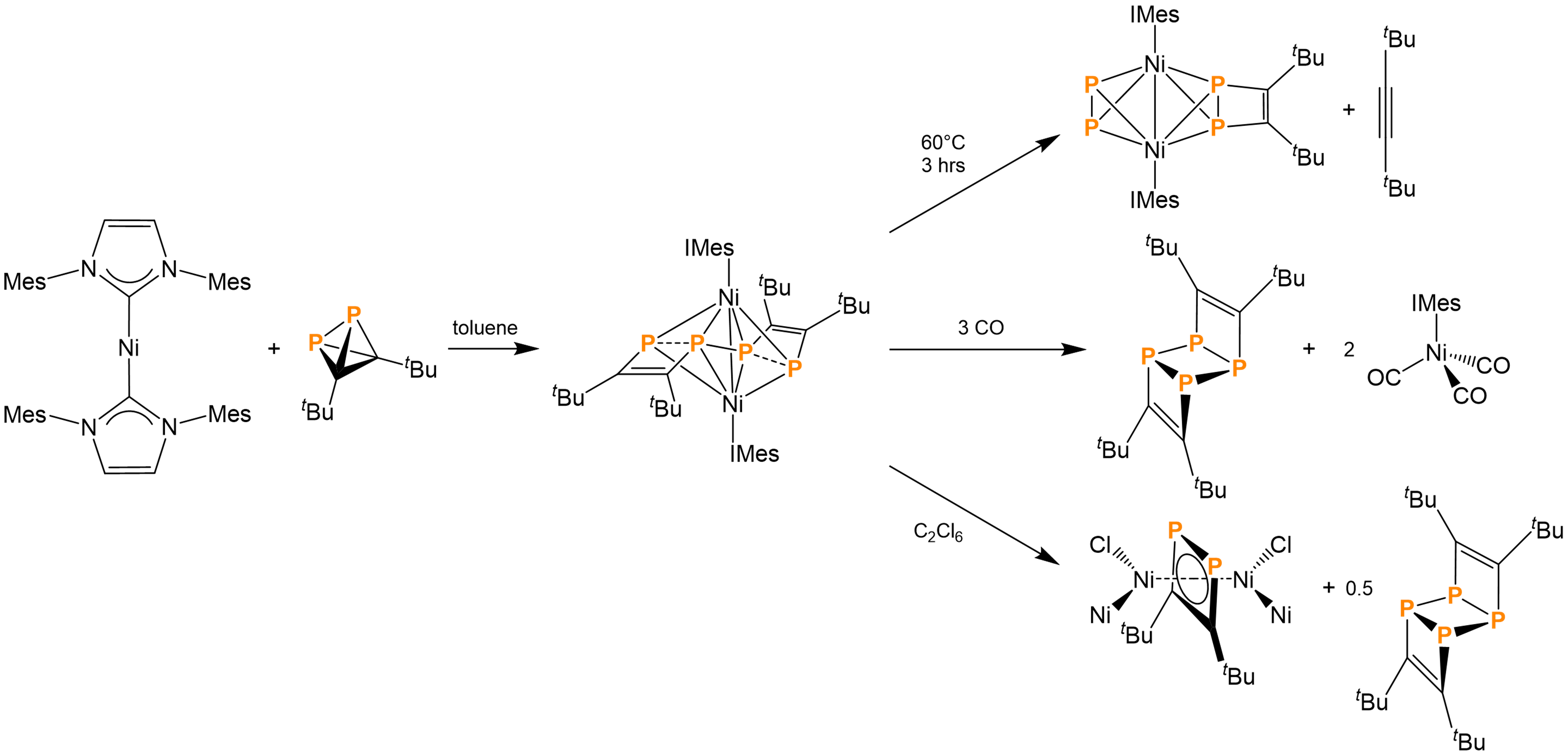
Di-tert-butyl-diphosphatetrahedrane reaction with Ni(IMes)_{2} and further reactions.

==== Ligand Substitution ====
In solution with coordination complexes, ^{t}Bu_{2}C_{2}P_{2} can cause ligand substitution. Most of these reactions cause cage-opening. The reaction of ^{t}Bu_{2}C_{2}P_{2} with [K([18]crown-6)][Fe(anthracene)_{2}] in toluene and THF causes the expulsion of one anthracene and the cage opening of ^{t}Bu_{2}C_{2}P_{2} to form the replacement 1,2-diphosphacyclobutadiene ligand. This cage opening is due to P-C bond cleavage. Mono-ligand substitution is also observed in the reaction of ^{t}Bu_{2}C_{2}P_{2} with [(^{Dipp}BIAN)M(COD)] (Dipp = 2,6-diisopropylphenyl, BIAN = bis(arylimino)acenaphthene, M = Fe, Co). The cobalt product, upon reaction with Cy_{2}PCl (Cy = cyclohexyl), forms a 1,2,3-triphospholium ligand. ^{t}Bu_{2}C_{2}P_{2} can also displace the toluene in Ni(toluene)(IPr). Toluene is replaced by the aforementioned ladderane analogue in a η^{2}-fashion.

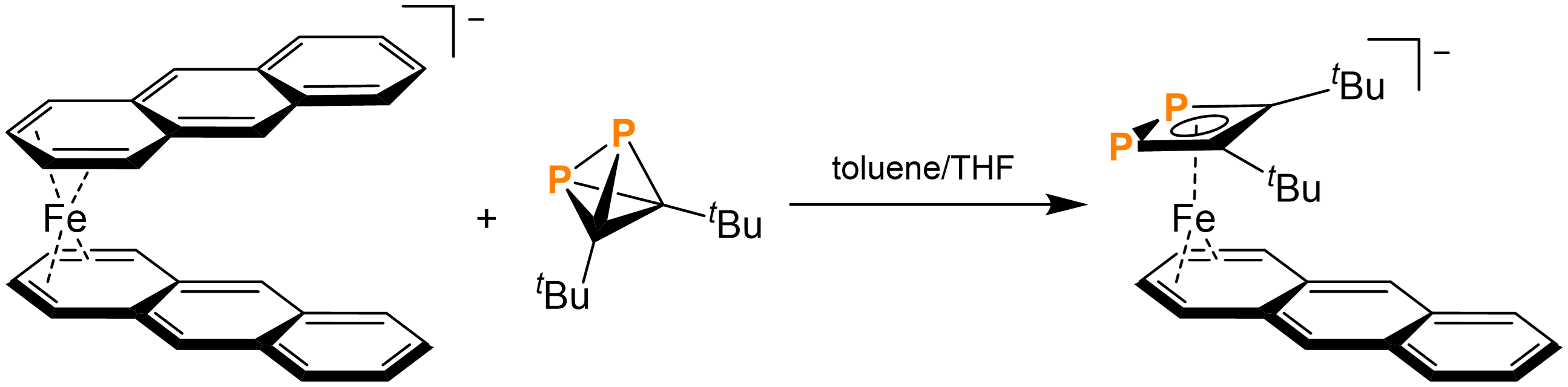
Diphosphatetrahedrane ligand substitution of anthracene forms 1,2-diphosphacyclobutadiene analogue.

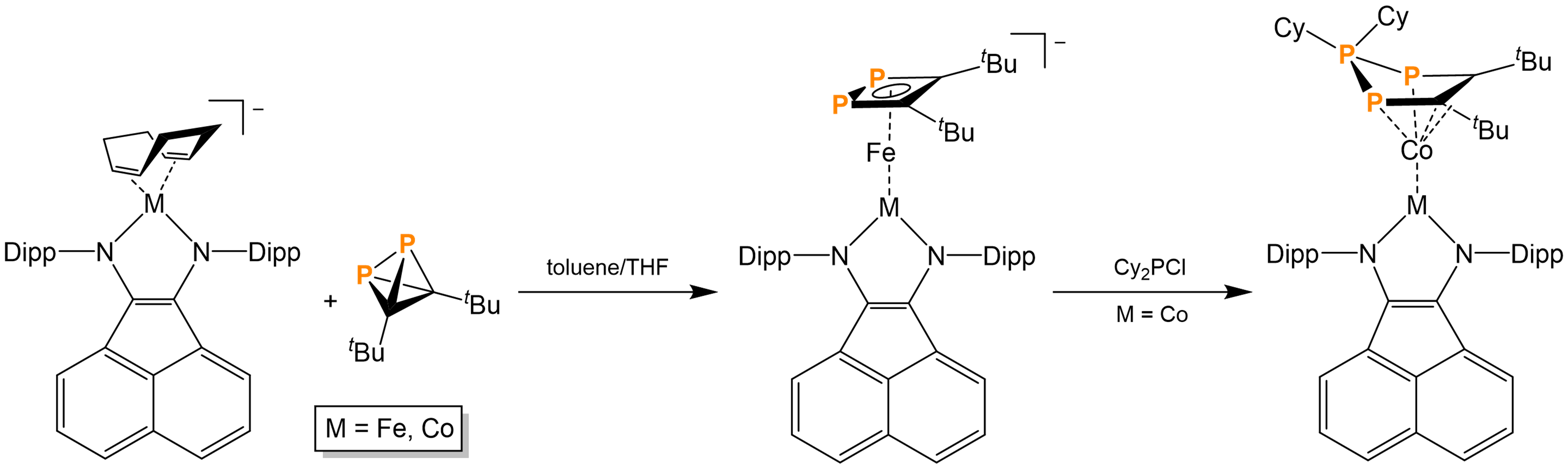
Diphosphatetrahedrane ligand substitution of cycloocta-1,5-diene forms triphosphacyclopentane analogue.

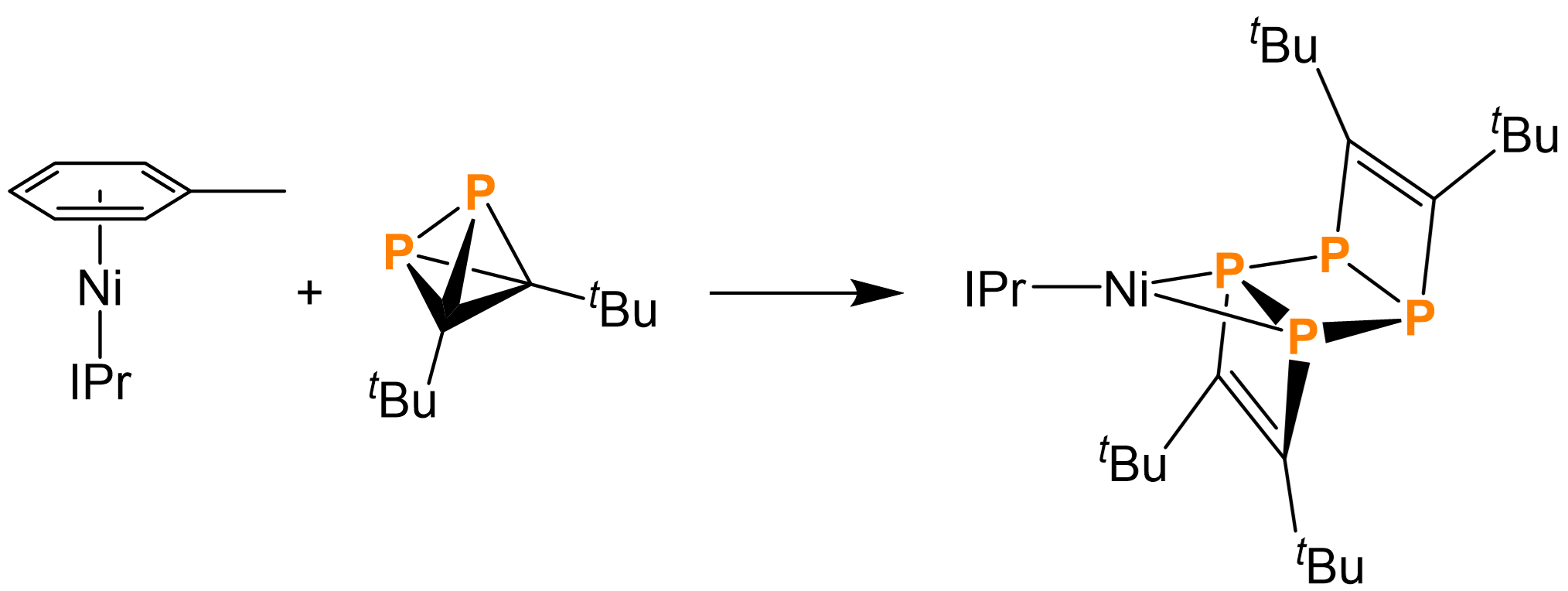
Diphosphatetrahedrane ligand substitution of toluene forms ladderane analogue.

Double-ligand substitution is seen in the reaction of ^{t}Bu_{2}C_{2}P_{2} with [Co(COD)_{2}][K(THF)_{0.2}]. The major product has its ligands doubly substituted by 1,2-diphosphacyclobutadiene. A minor product with double substitution by 1,3-diphosphacyclobutadiene ligand is also observed. However, the cobalt complex with one 1,2-diphosphacyclobutadiene ligand and one 1,3-diphosphacyclobutadiene ligand is not observed; this is likely due to steric clash between the tert-butyl substituents. The preference for 1,2-diphosphacyclobutadiene makes ^{t}Bu_{2}C_{2}P_{2} a potentially valuable retron as phosphalkynes are known to produce 1,3-diphosphacyclobutadiene.

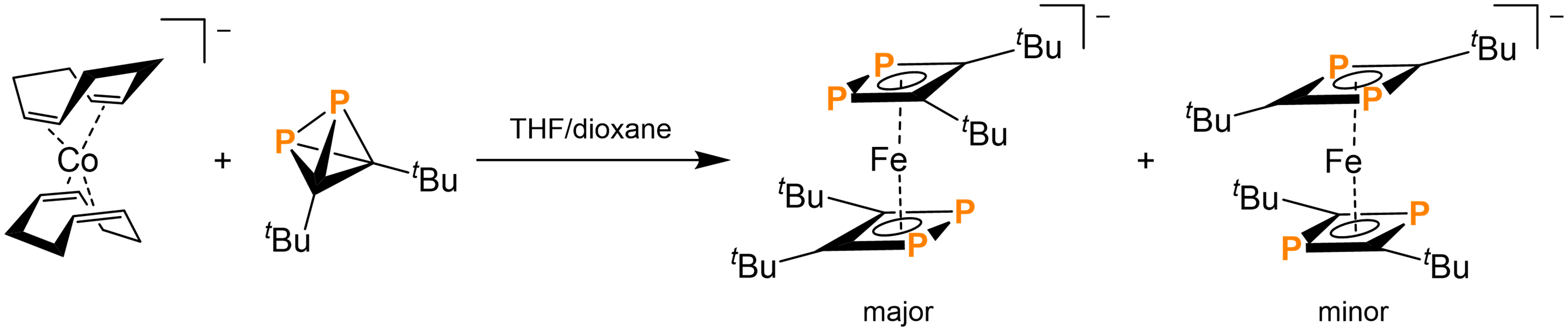
Diphosphatetrahedrane ligand substitution of cycloocta-1,5-diene forms diphosphacyclobutadiene analogues.

Only two of ^{t}Bu_{2}C_{2}P_{2}'s ligand substitution reactions are known to preserve the tetrahedral cage. Reacting (pftb)[Ag(CH_{2}Cl_{2})_{2}] (pftb = Al[PFTB]^{−} = Al[OC(CF_{3})_{3}]_{4}^{−}) with ^{t}Bu_{2}C_{2}P_{2} in lightless conditions leads to the generation of a disilver complex wherein each of the two ^{t}Bu_{2}C_{2}P_{2} ligates to one silver atom and each of the two ladderane analogues (vida infra) ligates to both silver atoms. By reacting Ni(CO)_{4} in THF at –80 °C and in the absence of light, three ^{t}Bu_{2}C_{2}P_{2} molecules coordinate to Ni in an η^{2}-fashion. Calculations by Intrinsic Bond Orbital (IBO) theory suggest that the coordination occurs through a 3-center-2-electron bond.

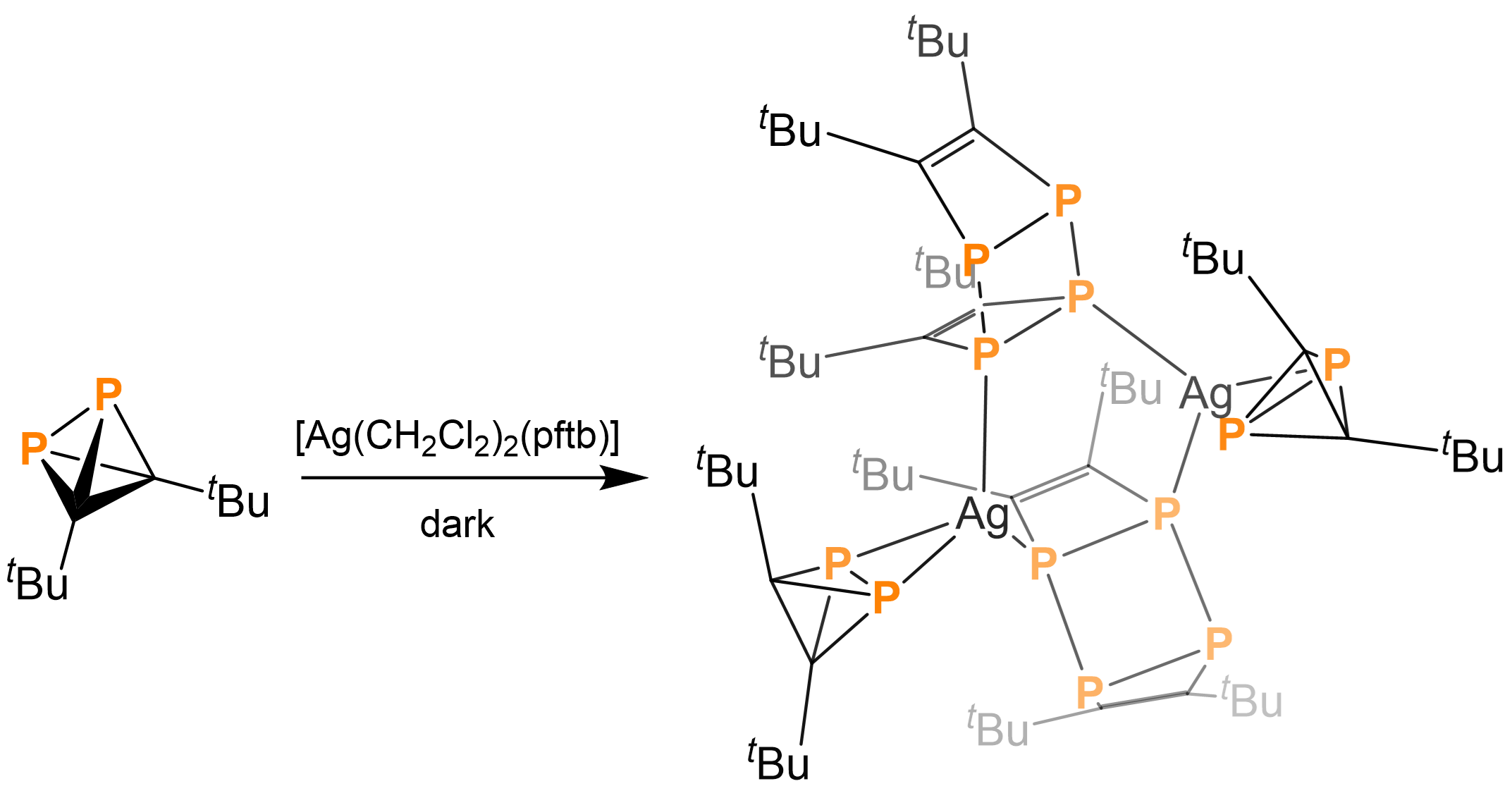
Diphosphatetrahedrane ligand substitution with [Ag(C_{2}H_{2}Cl_{2})_{2}](pftb).

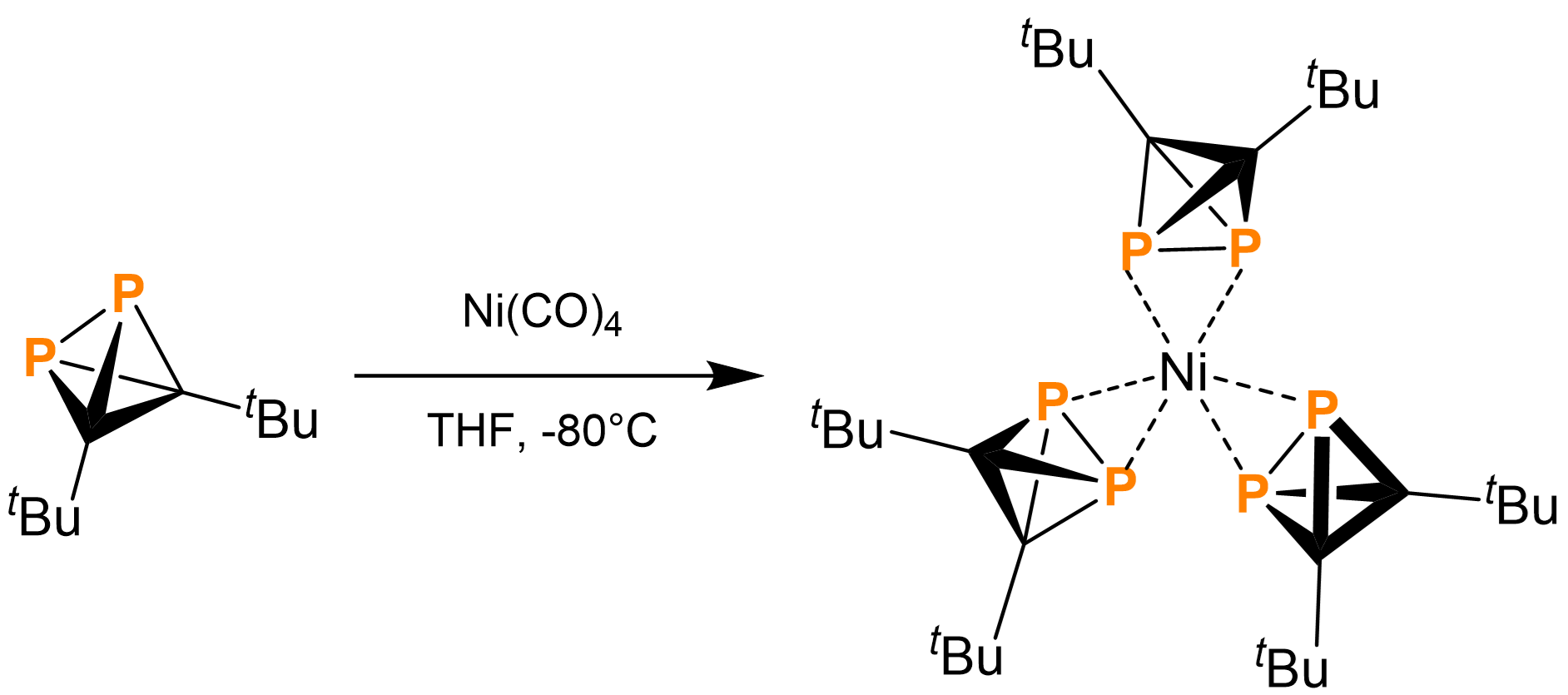
Reaction of diphosphatetrahedrane with Ni(CO)_{4} yields intact diphosphatetrahedrane ligands.

==== Reactions with N-Heterocyclic Carbenes ====
^{t}Bu_{2}C_{2}P_{2} can be used a retron to form phosphirenes or phosphaalkenes with the addition of 1 equivalent or 2 equivalents of N-heterocyclic carbenes (NHC), respectively. Upon the addition of 1 equivalent of IPr, IMes, or ^{Mes}DAC (1,3-bis(2,4,6-trimethylphenyl)diamidocarbene), ^{t}Bu_{2}C_{2}P_{2} undergoes ring opening at one phosphorus atom's P-C bonds, creating structures with a bridging P-P bond between the NHC and the phosphirene. IBO calculations and crystallographic evidence support the assignment of double bonding to the P=C bond to resultant molecule. This reaction is very slow, taking several weeks to reach completion.

Upon the addition of 2 equivalents of TMC (2,3,4,5-tetramethylimidazolin-2-ylidene) in benzene, both phosphorus atoms bond to THC. The P-P bond is broken. A double bond also forms between the two carbons of ^{t}Bu_{2}C_{2}P_{2}, generating a phosphaalkene. This reaction happens significantly faster, with a reported speed of 1 hour.

Selectivity between the two reactions is suggested to be achieved by changing the steric bulk of the NHC used. A bulky NHC should prefer generating a phosphirene, whereas a smaller NHC should prefer generating a phosphaalkene.

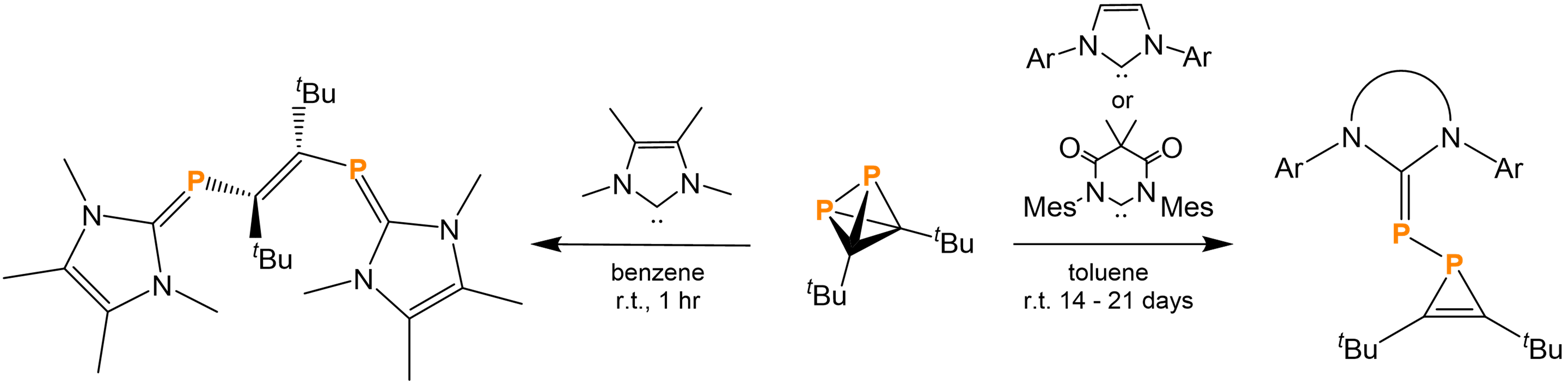
Diphosphatetrahedrane reactivity with NHCs is controlled by sterics.

=== Triphosphatetrahedrane ===
==== Reaction with (dppe)Fe(Cp*)Cl ====
HCP_{3}, upon addition of [(dppe)Fe(Cp*)]Cl (dppe = 1,2-bis-(diphenylphosphino)ethane) in sodium tetraphenylborate and THF, undergoes salt metathesis and produces [(dppe)Fe(Cp*)(HCP_{3})][BPh_{4}]. This product is crystallizable, producing purple crystals. This product is prone to decomposition back to HCP_{3}.

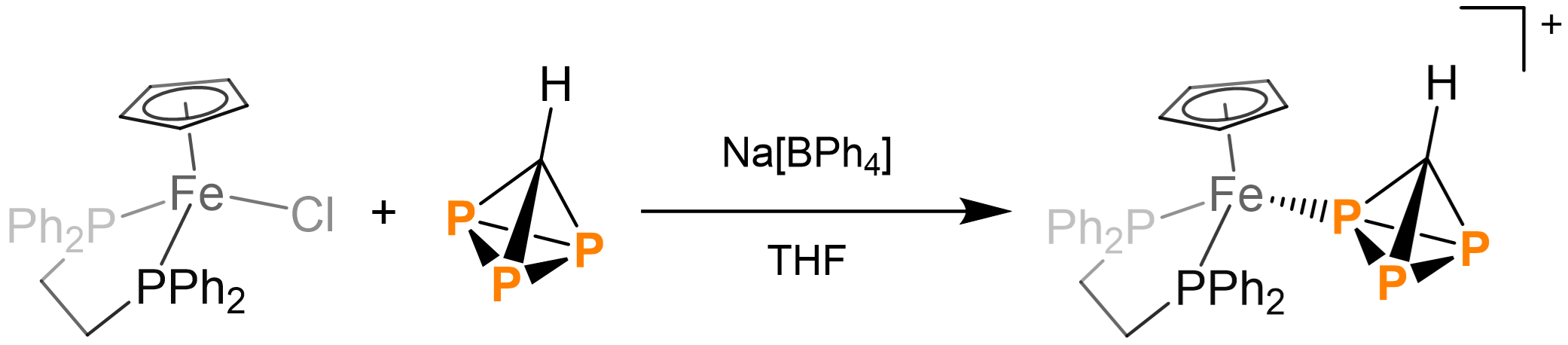
Triphosphatetrahedrane reaction with (dppe)Fe(Cp*)Cl.

== Theoretical Work ==
=== Azatetrahedranes ===
==== Bonding Parameters ====
Ring and cage strain results in poor angular overlap of orbitals, leading to non-linear bonding. Due to the interest in tetrahedrane and their azatetrahedral analogues as highly strained molecules, Politzer and Seminario introduced the "bond deviation index" to determine the deviation of the bond path — defined as the path following maxima between nuclei — and the linear bond between the nuclei.

$\lambda=\frac{1}{R}\bigg[\frac{1}{N}\sum_i^N{r_i^2}\bigg]^{\frac{1}{2}}$

The strain of experienced by H_{4}C_{4} is calculated to be partially alleviated upon the substitution of carbon atoms by nitrogen atoms. The bond deviation index decreases with the number of nitrogens in azatetrahedranes from 0.114 to 0.087 from 0 to 2 nitrogen atoms. The engendered stability is countered by the propensity of the N-N bond in the strained system to escape as dinitrogen. This is evidenced by the calculated bond length: 1.59 Å, which is much higher than that of aromatic N-N bonds: 1.21-1.36 Å.

On the basis of the higher electronegativity of nitrogen than carbon, azatetrahedranes have less negative electrostatic potentials at their C-C bonds than H_{4}C_{4}, leading to greater stability against electrophilic attacks. C-C and N-C bonds both contract in azatetrahedranes. This contraction leads to smaller bond deviations and stronger bonding, although the latter is dependent on the distance from the nitrogen atom(s). Azatetrahedranes also seem to distort from an ideal tetrahedral symmetry. These trends directly correlates with the number of nitrogen atoms. Nitration also contracts the tetrahedral core. However, essentially thermodynamically neutral nitro group rotation leads to small amounts of C-N lengthening, weaking the interaction and localizing the electrons.

Ionization of all azatetrahedranes cores in the series led to cage-opening at the G4MP2 and G4 levels of theory.

==== Thermodynamics ====
Early work on azatetrahedranes has also utilized isodesmic reactions — aphysical reactions where compounds are changing but bond types are not — to understand molecular stability. The isodesmic reaction energy is thus a metric of the stabilization/destabilization relative to the starting reagents. Overall, as the number of nitrogens increase, the stability of the system increases. The isodesmic reaction energy goes from 151.8 kcal/mol to 81.8 kcal/mol for 0 to 4 nitrogen atoms. Nitration destabilizes the energy dramatically, as exemplified by 2,4-dinitro-1,3-diazatetrahedrane ((O_{2}NC)_{2}N_{2}) having an isodesmic reaction energy of 152.9 kcal/mol.

Due to the instability of many azatetrahedranes, isodesmic comparisons to azacyclobutadiene analogues have been used to determine which core structures are the most synthetically feasible. Alkorta, Elguero, and Rozas reported that every member of the azatetrahedrane core series is always slightly more unstable than their azacyclobutadiene analogue(s). Jursic's calculations suggest that the energetic differential between the azatetrahedrane and the azacyclobutadiene starts off large and decreases as the number of nitrogen atoms increase in the cage. Furthermore, Jursic's calculations suggest that tetraazatetrahedrane may be slightly more stable (difference of 4.4 kcal/mol at 0 K and the CBSQ level of theory) than its azacyclobutadiene analogue. Despite the instability, non-sterically hindered azatetrahedranes may still be detectable in gaseous matrices.

=== Phosphatetrahedranes ===
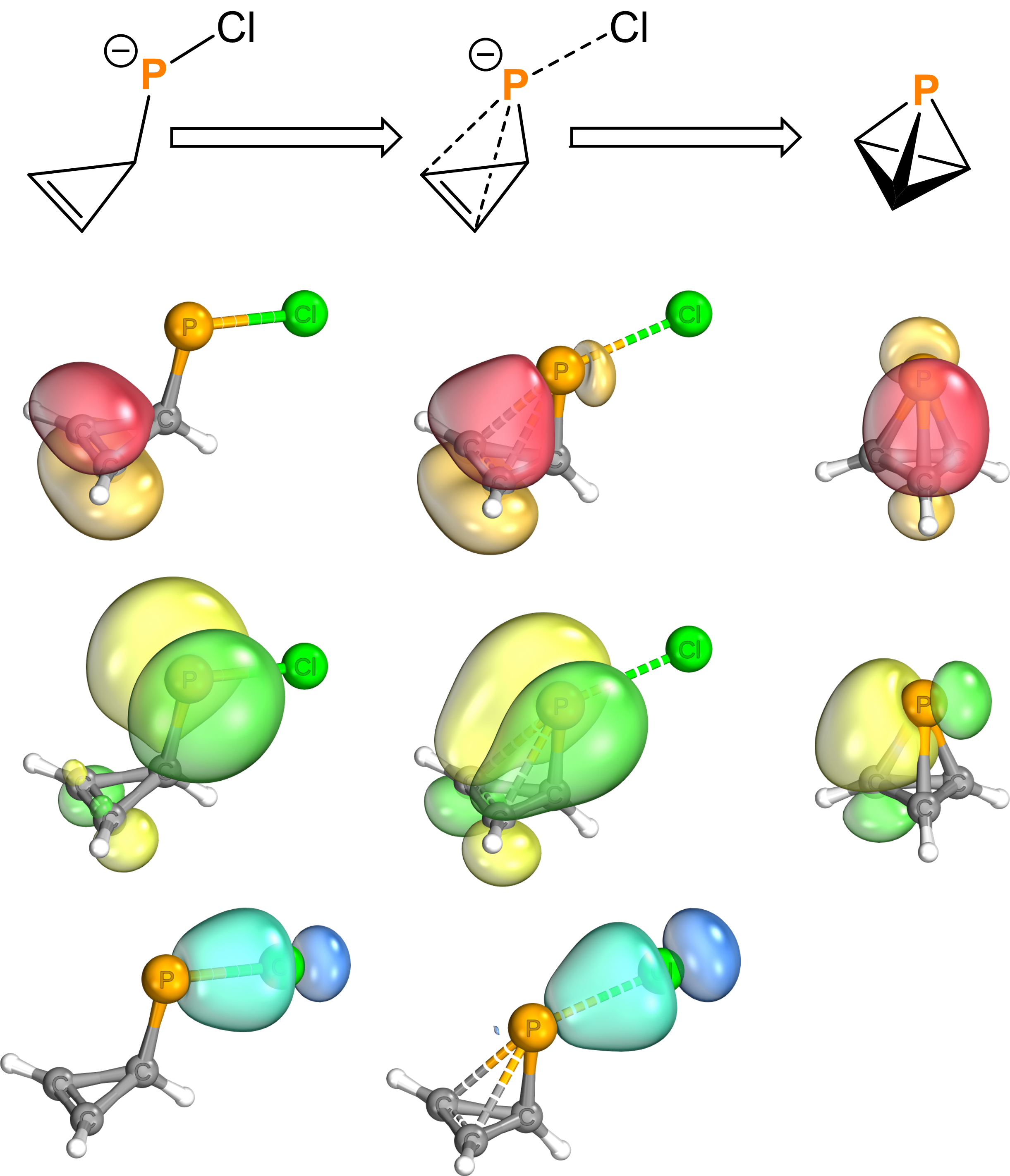
Intrinsic bond orbital analysis of monophosphatetrahedrane cage closing. Note that the intrinsic bond orbital corresponding P-Cl σ bond is localized on the chloride anion upon cage closing.

==== Bonding Parameters ====
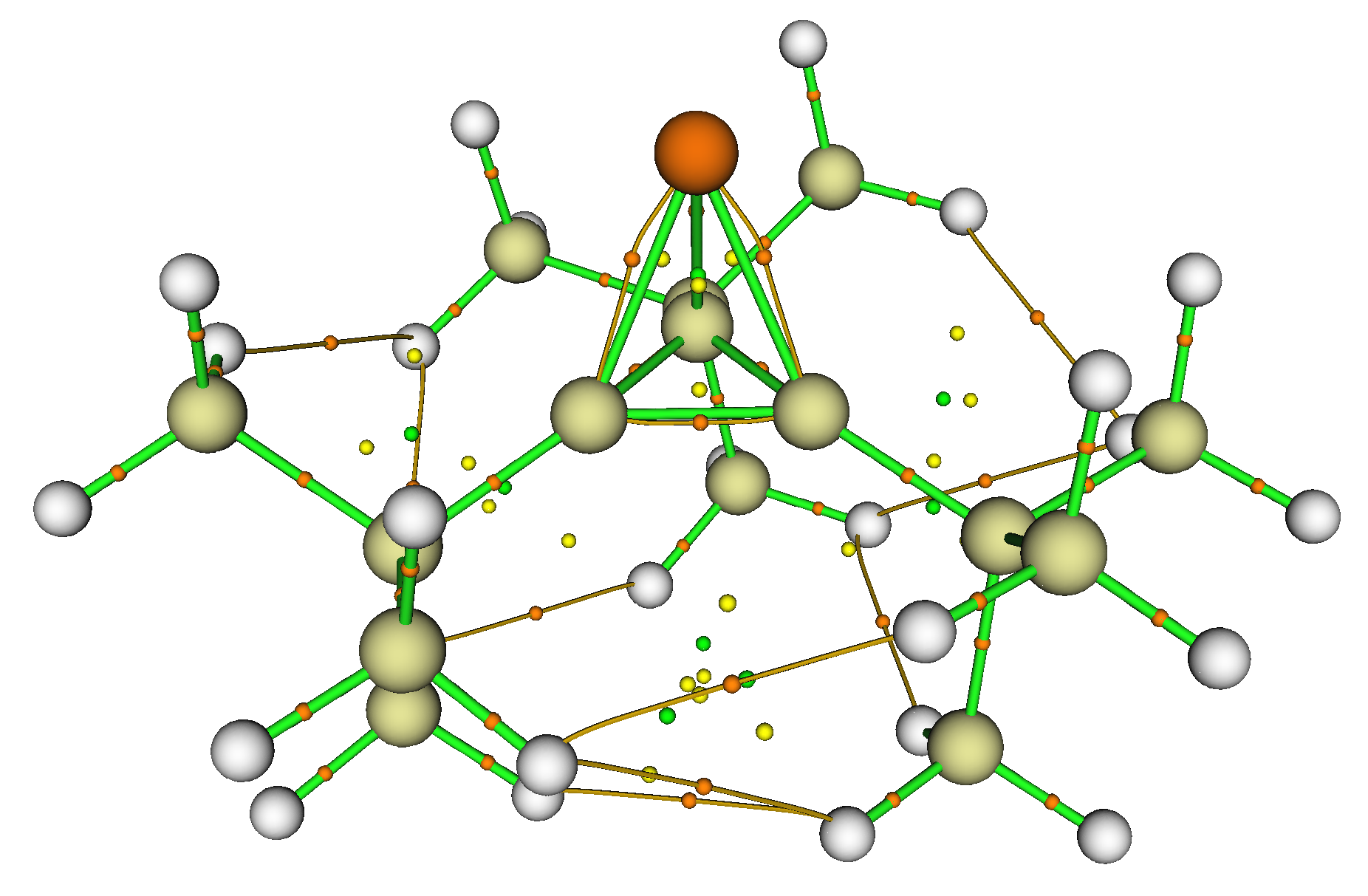
Molecular graph of tri-tert-butylmonophosphatetrahedrane optimized at the B3LYP-D3/6-31G** level of theory shows significant bond deviations.

Much like azatetrahedranes, phosphatetrahedranes show bond deviation. The molecular graph of ^{t}Bu_{3}C_{3}P shows significantly warped bond paths; the bond critical points lie far from the linear representation.

Investigations into the bonds of phosphatetrahedranes used quasi-atomic orbital analysis with isodesmic reactions. In contrast to azatetrahedranes, the lower electronegativity of phosphorus relative to carbon leads to a localization of negative charge in the carbons and the localization of positive charge in the phosphorus(es). This leads to greater occupancy in the C-C-C ring from 4.17 to 4.28 electrons with the addition of one phosphorus atom. Overall, the extent of charge transfer increases with the number of phosphorus atoms in the tetrahedral core.

Of the phosphatetrahedranes, only the triphosphatetrahedrane core did not show evidence of cage-opening upon ionization.

==== Thermodynamics ====
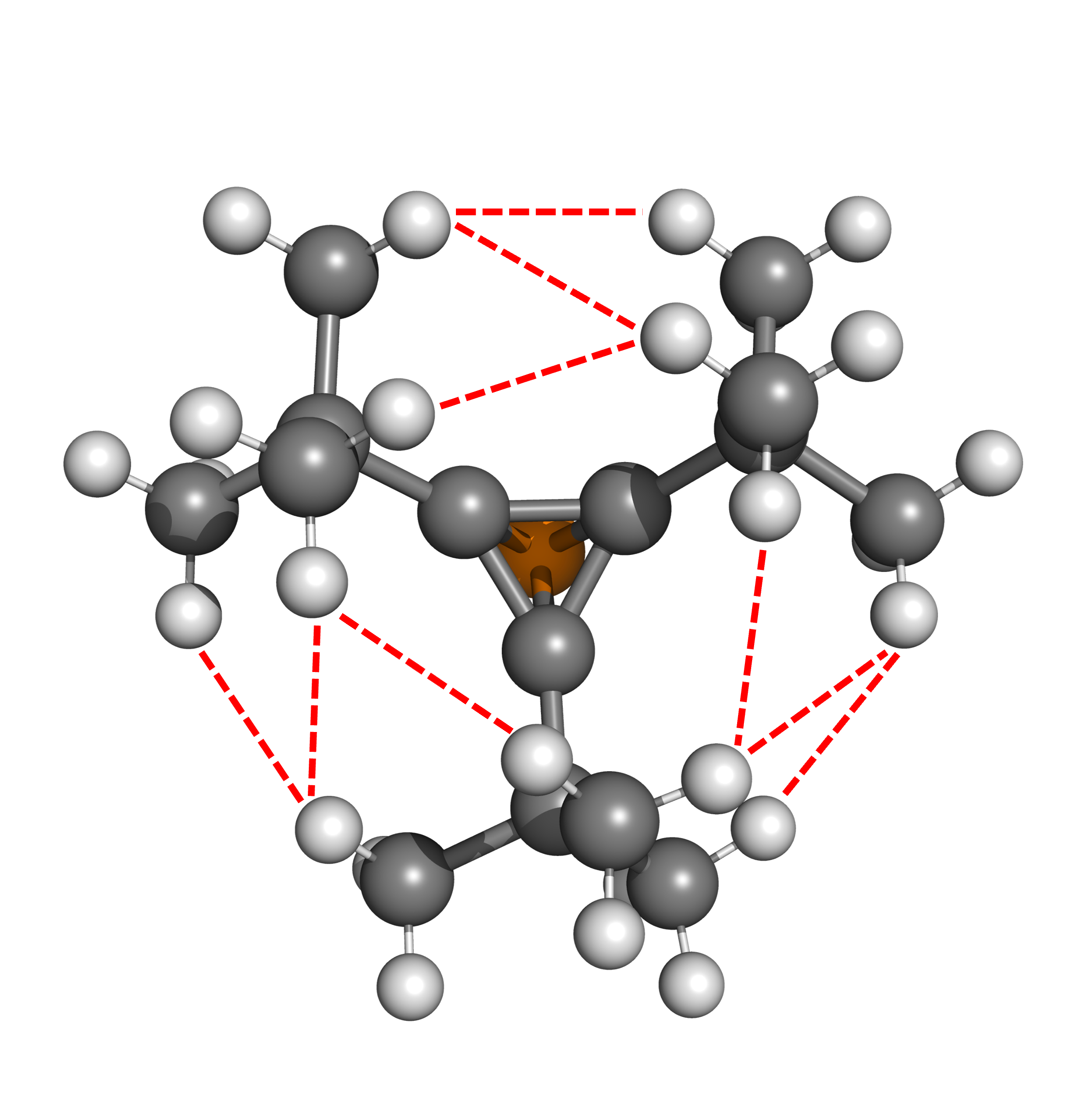
Depiction of the corset effect in tri-tert-butylmonophosphatetrahedrane where the attractive interaction between hydrogen atoms of neighboring tert-butyl groups are highlighted in red.

Ivanov, Bozhenko, and Boldyrev studied the energetic landscape of the phosphatetrahedrane series ((HC)_{x}P_{4−x}). Their calculations suggest that substitution of phosphorus for carbon increasingly favors the tetrahedral structure. The tetrahedral structure is the absolute minima starting for triphosphatetrahedrane, but diphosphatetrahedrane is only 2.3 kcal/mol higher in energy than the absolute minima. They attribute the stabilization of the tetrahedral structure to phosphorus' amiability towards more acute bond angles. The more diffuse orbitals of phosphorus versus carbon also favor the tetrahedral structure's σ-interactions over the planar phosphacyclobutadiene's π-interactions.

Riu, Ye, and Cummins report similar computational findings. Their calculations show decreasing strain energy with the number of phosphorus atoms in the tetrahedral cage. They also attribute the stabilization to the diffusitivity of phosphorus orbitals. They also note that the accumulation of p-character on the bond orbitals leads to greater s-character on the lone pairs.

The isolability of ^{t}Bu_{3}C_{3}P was attributed to the controversial hydrogen-hydrogen bonds (HHB), which some chemists have argued may not exist. Each HHB of the tert-butyl network were calculated (in absence of steric repulsion) to contribute 0.7 kcal/mol of stabilization. Calculations with one of the tert-butyl substituents with a methyl, ethyl, or isopropyl group result in net repulsion due to the loss of HHBs. In total, this forms the basis of the corset effect. Non-Lewis donation of electron density from the tetrahedral core to the tert-butyl substituents also stabilizes ^{t}Bu_{3}C_{3}P according to natural bond orbital theory. This effect was also demonstrated in silico for unsubstituted monophosphatetrahedrane.

=== Substitution by Heavier Congeners ===
Schaefer and coworkers, in light of the synthesis of ^{t}Bu_{3}C_{3}P, ran calculations on the mono-pnictogen-substituted tetrahedrane series, represented by R_{3}C_{3}Pn (R = H, ^{t}Bu, Pn = N, P, As, Sb, Bi). These calculations yielded a series of well correlated trends.

Consistent with a perturbation of the pnictogen residing above a C-C-C ring, the C-Pn bonds elongate from 1.493 Å to 2.289 Å, and C-Pn-C angle decreases from 58.0° to 37.1° as heavier congeners are used. This is due to the larger atomic radius of the heavier pnictogens. The H-[C-C-C plane] angle increases from 9.1° to 31.1°, which is also attributed to the diffusivity of the heavier congener's orbitals.

As noted above with the aza- and phosphatetrahedranes, the change in pnictogen electronegativity changes the interaction between the Pn atom and the C-C-C ring. The C-C-C ring becomes increasingly more negatively charged with the heavier pnictogens.

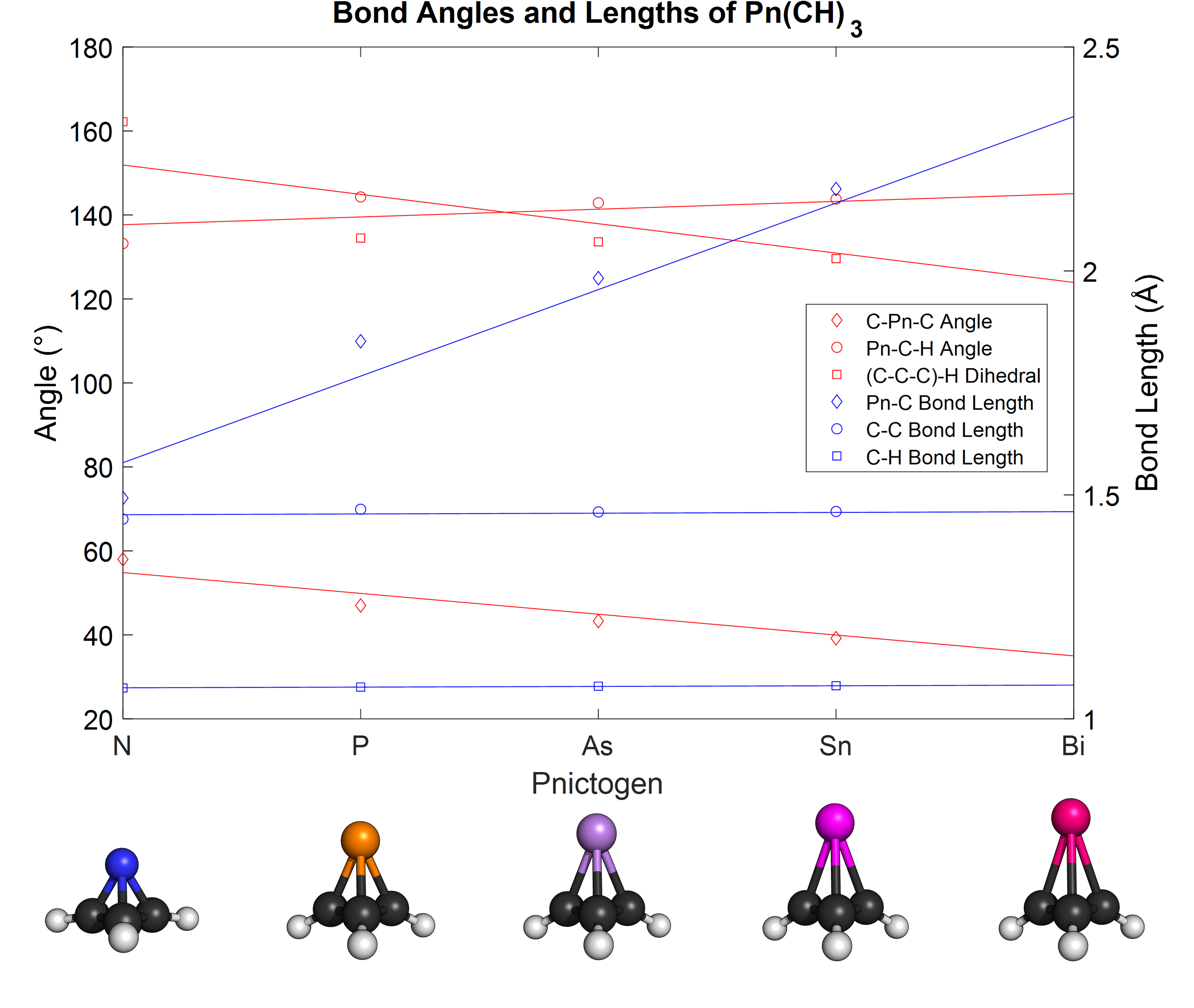
Tabulated bond angles and lengths of the mono-pnictogen-substituted tetrahedrane series calculated at the CCSD(T)/aug-cc-pwCVTZ(-PP) level of theory.

Isodesmic reactions show greater stabilization of the cage structure due to the diffusivity of the pnictogen's orbitals, although even with bismuth, the mono-pnictogen-substituted tetrahedrane is unstable. Delocalization plays a large part in the stabilization of the heavier analogues. For example, electron density is increasingly transferred from the Pn-C bonds into the Pn lone pair in the heavier congeners. These lone pairs are also noted to follow Bent's rule.

As noted above with ^{t}Bu_{3}C_{3}P, non-Lewis interactions stabilize the tetrahedral core. These effects also become more pronounced with the heavier pnictogens. Second order perturbations suggest that the key non-Lewis interactions are C-C to C-R* and C-Pn to C-H* (i.e., cage-opening), as well as interactions to Pn-C*. The former set of interactions stabilize the tetrahedral core most when the substituent is an electron-withdrawing group (e.g., fluoride), although decreased electron density in C-C and C-Pn can facilitate cage-opening as well.

== See also ==
- Tetrahedrane
- White phosphorus
- Yellow arsenic
- Prismane
- Cubane
- Cyclobutadiene
