= Transferability =

Transferability may refer to:

- Transferability (chemistry), an assumption in chemistry regarding atoms
- Transferability (economics), the costs of moving goods from one place to another
