= Covalent (disambiguation) =

Covalent may refer to:

- Covalent bond, a type of chemical bond
  - Covalent radius, half the distance between two covalently bonded atoms
  - Covalent modulation, the alteration of protein structure by covalent bonding
