= Tetrahedrane =

Hypothetical organic molecule with a tetrahedral structure

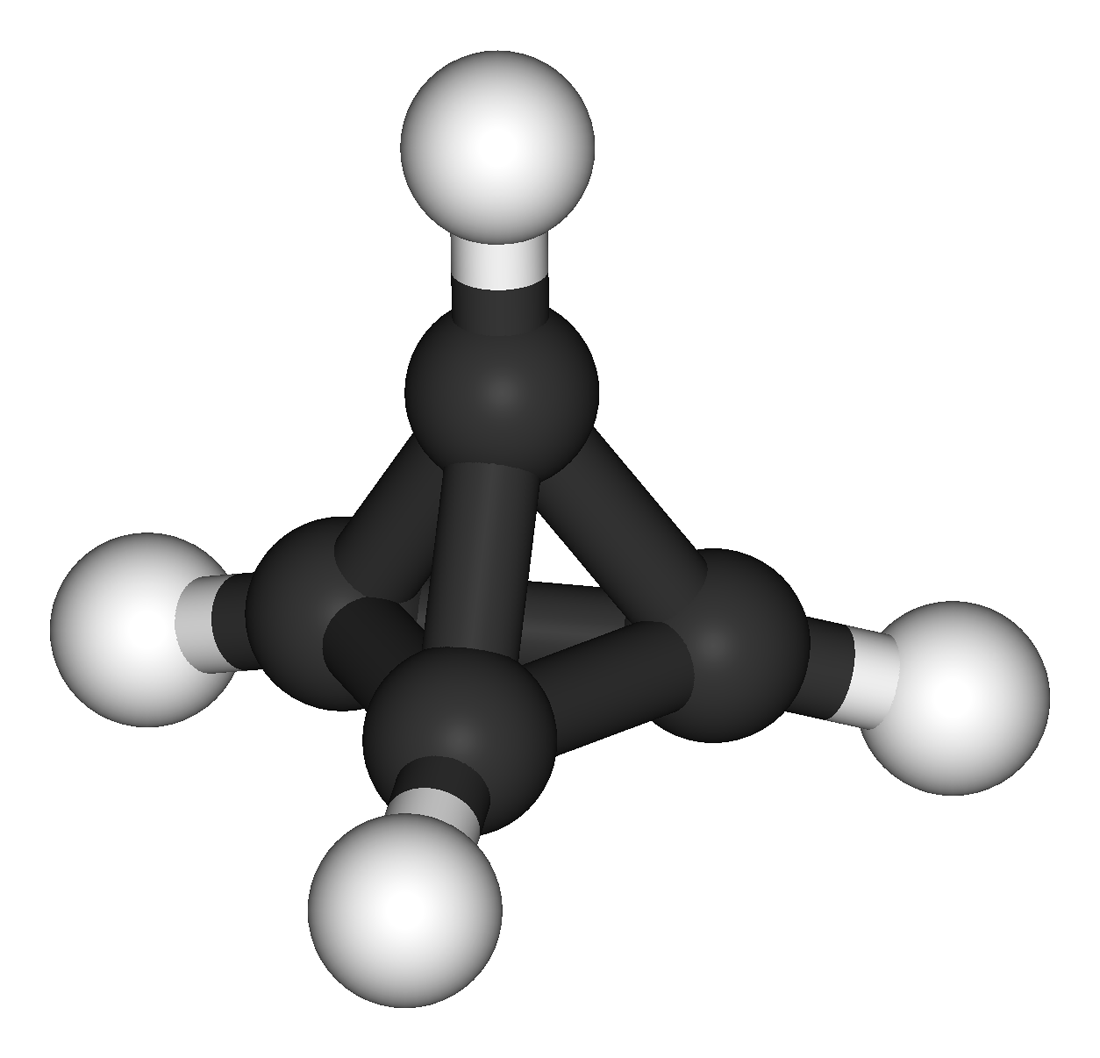
- Ball and stick model of tetrahedrane

Names
- Preferred IUPAC name Tricyclo[1.1.0.0^{2,4}]butane

Identifiers
CAS Number	157-39-1
3D model (JSmol)	Interactive image
Beilstein Reference	2035811
ChEBI	CHEBI:36549
ChemSpider	7827619
PubChem CID	9548696
CompTox Dashboard (EPA)	DTXSID20429532
- InChI: InChI=1S/C4H4/c1-2-3(1)4(1)2/h1-4H Key: FJGIHZCEZAZPSP-UHFFFAOYSA-N
- SMILES: C12C3C1C23

Properties
Chemical formula	C_{4}H_{4}
Molar mass	52.076 g·mol^{−1}
- Except where otherwise noted, data are given for materials in their standard state (at 25 °C [77 °F], 100 kPa). verify (what is ?) Infobox references

Tetrahedrane is a hypothetical platonic hydrocarbon with chemical formula C_{4}H_{4} and a tetrahedral structure. The molecule would be subject to considerable angle strain and has not been synthesized as of 2023. However, a number of derivatives have been prepared. In a more general sense, the term tetrahedranes is used to describe a class of molecules and ions with related structure, e.g. white phosphorus.

== C_{4} tetrahedranes ==
Tetrahedrane (C_{4}H_{4}) is one of the possible platonic hydrocarbons and has the IUPAC name tricyclo[1.1.0.0^{2,4}]butane.

Unsubstituted tetrahedrane remains elusive, although predicted kinetically stable. One strategy that has been explored (but thus far failed) is reaction of propene with atomic carbon.

However, several organic compounds with the tetrahedrane core are known. All have multiply bulky substituents, tert-butyl (t-Bu) or larger. Locking a tetrahedrane molecule inside a fullerene has only been attempted in silico.

All known syntheses have relied on rearrangement from another unstable moiety. In Maier's original synthesis, photochemical cheletropic decarbonylation converts a cyclopentadienone to the tetrahedrane. In a later synthesis, irradiation directly converted a cyclobutadiene to tetrahedrane. And more recently, single-electron oxidation can induce a radical chain isomerization with the same effect.

Tetrahedrane with small substituents would have a variety of interesting properties. Due to its bond strain and stoichiometry, tetranitrotetrahedrane has potential as a high-performance energetic material (explosive).

Calculations suggest that tetrahedrane's molecular strain reduces if slightly-flexible diyne spacers separate the vertices.

=== Tetra-tert-butyltetrahedrane ===
In 1978, Günther Maier first prepared tetra-tert-butyl-tetrahedrane, with a deceptively short and simple synthesis that required "astonishing persistence and experimental skill". "The relatively straightforward scheme shown [...] conceals both the limited availability of the starting material and the enormous amount of work required in establishing the proper conditions for each step." In Maier's own account, it took several years of careful observation and optimization to develop the correct conditions for the reactions. For instance, the synthesis of tetrakis(t-butyl)cyclopentadienone from the tris(t-butyl)bromocyclopentadienone (itself synthesized with much difficulty) required over 50 attempts before working conditions could be found.

Maier began with cycloaddition of an alkyne to t-Bu substituted maleic anhydride. Rearrangement and decarboxylation gave a corset-stabilized cyclopentadienone. To add the fourth t-Bu group, Maier brominated the only labile hydrogen to give an electrophile that coupled directly to tert-butyllithium. Photochemical cheletropic decarbonylation then gave the target.

Tetra-tert-butyl-tetrahedrane synthesis 1978

Heating tetra-tert-butyltetrahedrane gives tetra-tert-butylcyclobutadiene. The reversibility of this rearrangement proved key to developing a more scalable synthesis. In the last step, photolysis of a cyclopropenyl-substituted diazomethane affords the desired product through a tetrakis(tert-butyl)cyclobutadiene intermediate:

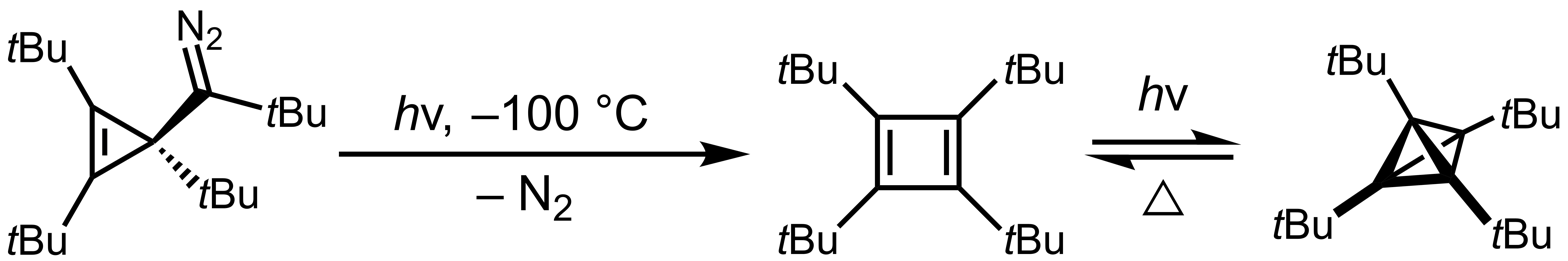
Tetra-tert-butyl-tetrahedrane synthesis 1991

=== Trimethylsilyl tetrahedranes ===
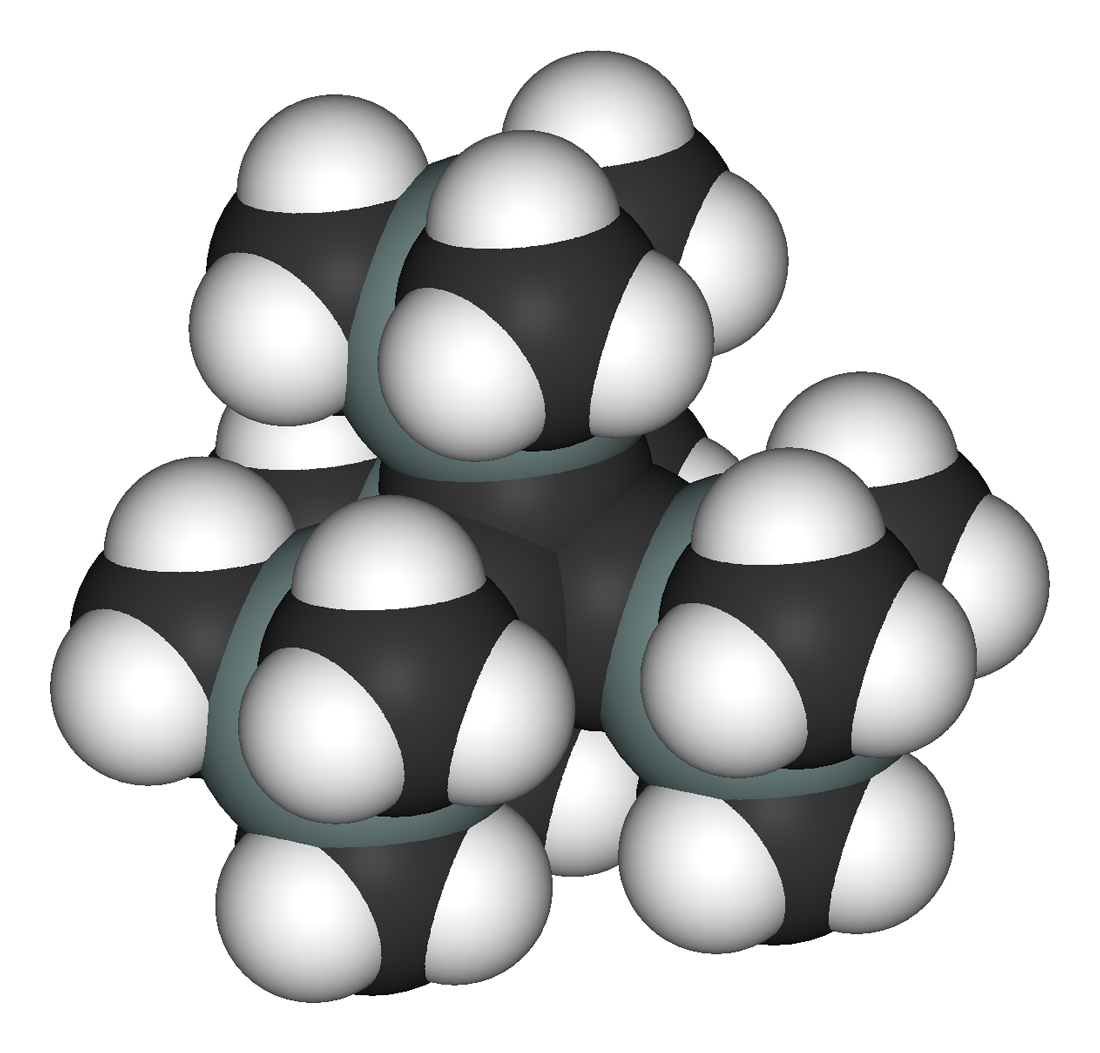
Tetrakis(trimethylsilyl)tetrahedrane is relatively stable

Tetrakis(trimethylsilyl)tetrahedrane can be prepared by treatment of the cyclobutadiene precursor with tris(pentafluorophenyl)borane and is far more stable than the tert-butyl analogue. The silicon–carbon bond is longer than a carbon–carbon bond, and therefore the corset effect is reduced. Whereas the tert-butyl tetrahedrane melts at 135 °C concomitant with rearrangement to the cyclobutadiene, tetrakis(trimethylsilyl)tetrahedrane, which melts at 202 °C, is stable up to 300 °C, at which point it cracks to bis(trimethylsilyl)acetylene.

The tetrahedrane skeleton is made up of banana bonds, and hence the carbon atoms are high in s-orbital character. From NMR, sp-hybridization can be deduced, normally reserved for triple bonds. As a consequence the bond lengths are unusually short with 152 picometers.

Reaction with methyllithium with tetrakis(trimethylsilyl)tetrahedrane yields tetrahedranyllithium. The lithium compound can then couple to electrophiles, even relatively small ones.

A bis(tetrahedrane) has also been reported. The connecting bond is even shorter with 143.6 pm. An ordinary carbon–carbon bond has a length of 154 pm. The unsubstituted bitetrahedral molecule C_{8}H_{6} has been proposed as a candidate for the molecule with the shortest possible carbon-carbon single bond.

Synthesis of tetrakis(trimethylsilyl)tetrahedrane and its dimer.

== Tetrahedranes with non-carbon core atoms ==
Structure of [InC(tms)_{3}]_{4}, a tetrahedrane with an In_{4} core (dark gray = In, orange = Si).

The tetrahedrane motif occurs broadly in chemistry. White phosphorus (P_{4}) and yellow arsenic (As_{4}) naturally form tetrahedrane-like clusters. There are a wide variety of synthetic pnictogen-substituted tetrahedranes, and metallatetrahedranes with a single metal (or phosphorus atom) capping a cyclopropyl trianion also exist. Several metal carbonyl clusters are referred to as tetrahedranes, e.g. tetrarhodium dodecacarbonyl.

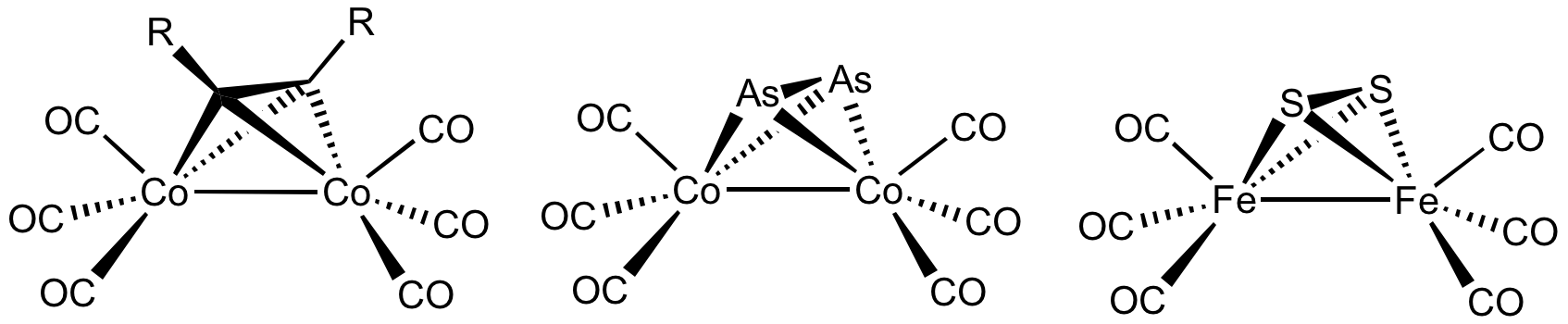
Metal clusters that have tetrahedral cores are often called tetrahedranes.

Silicon also can be induced to form a tetrahedral core, but heavier adamantogens tend to form cubane-like clusters.

=== Tetrasilatetrahedrane ===
In tetrasilatetrahedrane features a core of four silicon atoms. The standard silicon–silicon bond is much longer (235 pm) and the cage is again enveloped by a total of 16 trimethylsilyl groups, which confer stability. The silatetrahedrane can be reduced with potassium graphite to the tetrasilatetrahedranide potassium derivative. In this compound one of the silicon atoms of the cage has lost a silyl substituent and carries a negative charge. The potassium cation can be sequestered by a crown ether, and in the resulting complex potassium and the silyl anion are separated by a distance of 885 pm. One of the Si^{−}–Si bonds is now 272 pm and the tetravalent silicon atom of that bond has an inverted tetrahedral geometry. Furthermore, the four cage silicon atoms are equivalent on the NMR timescale due to migrations of the silyl substituents over the cage.

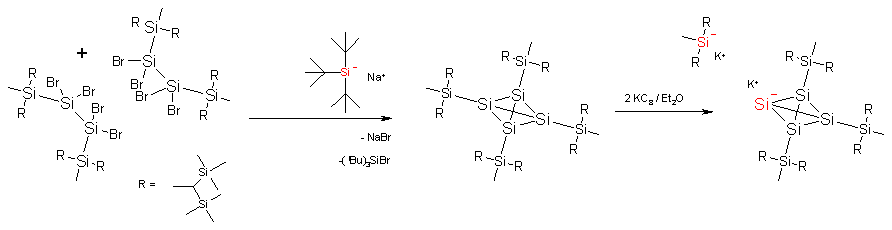
Tetrasilatetrahedrane

The dimerization reaction observed for the carbon tetrahedrane compound is also attempted for a tetrasilatetrahedrane. In this tetrahedrane the cage is protected by four so-called supersilyl groups in which a silicon atom has 3 tert-butyl substituents. The dimer does not materialize but a reaction with iodine in benzene followed by reaction with the tri-tert-butylsilaanion results in the formation of an eight-membered silicon cluster compound which can be described as a Si_{2} dumbbell (length 229 pm and with inversion of tetrahedral geometry) sandwiched between two almost-parallel Si_{3} rings.

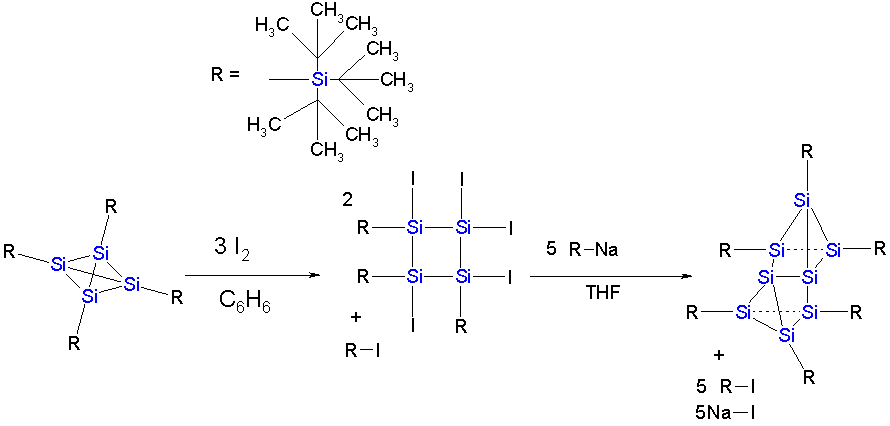
Silicon cluster compound

== See also ==
- Dodecahedrane
- Prismane
- Prismane C_{8}
