= Covalent radius =

Measure of the size of an atom that forms part of one covalent bond

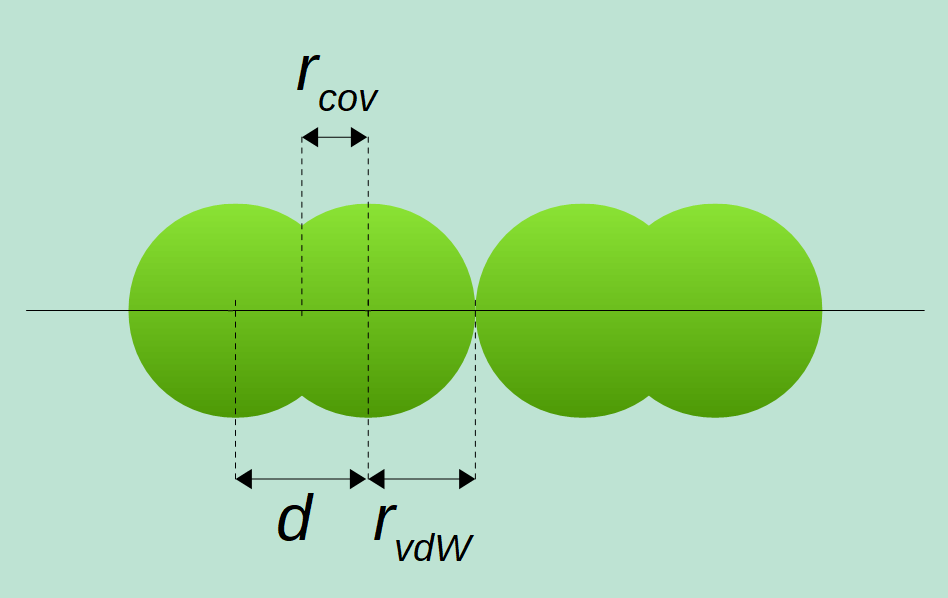

The covalent radius, r_{cov}, is a measure of the size of an atom that forms part of one covalent bond. It is usually measured either in picometres (pm) or angstroms (Å), with 1 Å = 100 pm.

In principle, the sum of the two covalent radii should equal the covalent bond length between two atoms, R(AB) = r(A) + r(B). Moreover, different radii can be introduced for single, double and triple bonds (r_{1}, r_{2} and r_{3} below), in a purely operational sense. These relationships are certainly not exact because the size of an atom is not constant but depends on its chemical environment. For heteroatomic A–B bonds, ionic terms may enter. Often the polar covalent bonds are shorter than would be expected based on the sum of covalent radii. Tabulated values of covalent radii are either average or idealized values, which nevertheless show a certain transferability between different situations, which makes them useful.

The bond lengths R(AB) are measured by X-ray diffraction (more rarely, neutron diffraction on molecular crystals). Rotational spectroscopy can also give extremely accurate values of bond lengths. For homonuclear A–A bonds, Linus Pauling took the covalent radius to be half the single-bond length in the element, e.g. R(H–H, in H_{2}) = 74.14 pm so r_{cov}(H) = 37.07 pm: in practice, it is usual to obtain an average value from a variety of covalent compounds, although the difference is usually small. Sanderson has published a recent set of non-polar covalent radii for the main-group elements, but the availability of large collections of bond lengths, which are more transferable, from the Cambridge Crystallographic Database has rendered covalent radii obsolete in many situations.

== Average radii ==
The values in the table below are based on a statistical analysis of more than 228,000 experimental bond lengths from the Cambridge Structural Database. For carbon, values are given for the different hybridisations of the orbitals.

Covalent radii in pm from analysis of the Cambridge Structural Database, which contains about 1,030,000 crystal structures
H																		He
1																		2
31(5)																		28
Li	Be												B	C	N	O	F	Ne
3	4	Radius (standard deviation) / pm											5	6	7	8	9	10
128(7)	96(3)												84(3)	sp^{3} 76(1) sp^{2} 73(2) sp 69(1)	71(1)	66(2)	57(3)	58
Na	Mg												Al	Si	P	S	Cl	Ar
11	12												13	14	15	16	17	18
166(9)	141(7)												121(4)	111(2)	107(3)	105(3)	102(4)	106(10)
K	Ca		Sc	Ti	V	Cr	Mn	Fe	Co	Ni	Cu	Zn	Ga	Ge	As	Se	Br	Kr
19	20		21	22	23	24	25	26	27	28	29	30	31	32	33	34	35	36
203(12)	176(10)		170(7)	160(8)	153(8)	139(5)	l.s. 139(5) h.s. 161(8)	l.s. 132(3) h.s. 152(6)	l.s. 126(3) h.s. 150(7)	124(4)	132(4)	122(4)	122(3)	120(4)	119(4)	120(4)	120(3)	116(4)
Rb	Sr		Y	Zr	Nb	Mo	Tc	Ru	Rh	Pd	Ag	Cd	In	Sn	Sb	Te	I	Xe
37	38		39	40	41	42	43	44	45	46	47	48	49	50	51	52	53	54
220(9)	195(10)		190(7)	175(7)	164(6)	154(5)	147(7)	146(7)	142(7)	139(6)	145(5)	144(9)	142(5)	139(4)	139(5)	138(4)	139(3)	140(9)
Cs	Ba	*	Lu	Hf	Ta	W	Re	Os	Ir	Pt	Au	Hg	Tl	Pb	Bi	Po	At	Rn
55	56		71	72	73	74	75	76	77	78	79	80	81	82	83	84	85	86
244(11)	215(11)		187(8)	175(10)	170(8)	162(7)	151(7)	144(4)	141(6)	136(5)	136(6)	132(5)	145(7)	146(5)	148(4)	140(4)	150	150
Fr	Ra	**
87	88
260	221(2)
		*	La	Ce	Pr	Nd	Pm	Sm	Eu	Gd	Tb	Dy	Ho	Er	Tm	Yb
			57	58	59	60	61	62	63	64	65	66	67	68	69	70
			207(8)	204(9)	203(7)	201(6)	199	198(8)	198(6)	196(6)	194(5)	192(7)	192(7)	189(6)	190(10)	187(8)
		**	Ac	Th	Pa	U	Np	Pu	Am	Cm
			89	90	91	92	93	94	95	96
			215	206(6)	200	196(7)	190(1)	187(1)	180(6)	169(3)

== Radius for multiple bonds ==
A different approach is to make a self-consistent fit for all elements in a smaller set of molecules. This was done separately for single, double, and triple bonds up to superheavy elements. Both experimental and computational data were used. The single-bond results are often similar to those of Cordero et al. When they are different, the coordination numbers used can be different. This is notably the case for most (d and f) transition metals. Normally one expects that r_{1} > r_{2} > r_{3}. Deviations may occur for weak multiple bonds, if the differences of the ligand are larger than the differences of R in the data used.

Note that elements up to atomic number 118 (oganesson) have now been experimentally produced and that there are chemical studies on an increasing number of them. The same, self-consistent approach was used to fit tetrahedral covalent radii for 30 elements in 48 crystals with subpicometer accuracy.

Single-, double-, triple-, and sixfold- bond covalent radii, determined using typically 400 experimental or calculated primary distances, R, per set.
H

He
1

2
32
-
-

46
-
-
Li
Be

B
C
N
O
F
Ne
3
4
Radius / pm:
5
6
7
8
9
10
133
124
-
102
90
85
single-bond

double-bond

triple-bond

sixfold-bond

85
78
73
75
67
60
71
60
54
63
57
53
64
59
53
67
96
-
Na
Mg

Al
Si
P
S
Cl
Ar
11
12

13
14
15
16
17
18
155
160
-
139
132
127

126
113
111
116
107
102
111
102
94
103
94
95
99
95
93
96
107
96
K
Ca

Sc
Ti
V
Cr
Mn
Fe
Co
Ni
Cu
Zn
Ga
Ge
As
Se
Br
Kr
19
20

21
22
23
24
25
26
27
28
29
30
31
32
33
34
35
36
196
193
-
171
147
133

148
116
114
136
117
108

89

134
112
106

83

122
111
103

82

119
105
103

79

116
109
102

80

111
103
96
110
101
101
112
115
120
118
120
-
124
117
121
121
111
114
121
114
106
116
107
107
114
109
110
117
121
108
Rb
Sr

Y
Zr
Nb
Mo
Tc
Ru
Rh
Pd
Ag
Cd
In
Sn
Sb
Te
I
Xe
37
38

39
40
41
42
43
44
45
46
47
48
49
50
51
52
53
54
210
202
-
185
157
139

163
130
124
154
127
121

108

147
125
116

100

138
121
113

97

128
120
110

98

125
114
103

99

125
110
106
120
117
112
128
139
137
136
144
-
142
136
146
140
130
132
140
133
127
136
128
121
133
129
125
131
135
122
Cs
Ba
*
Lu
Hf
Ta
W
Re
Os
Ir
Pt
Au
Hg
Tl
Pb
Bi
Po
At
Rn
55
56

71
72
73
74
75
76
77
78
79
80
81
82
83
84
85
86
232
209
-
196
161
149

162
131
131
152
128
122

109

146
126
119

105

137
120
115

102

131
119
110

102

129
116
109

103

122
115
107
123
112
110
124
121
123
133
142
-
144
142
150
144
135
137
151
141
135
145
135
129
147
138
138
142
145
133
Fr
Ra
**
Lr
Rf
Db
Sg
Bh
Hs
Mt
Ds
Rg
Cn
Nh
Fl
Mc
Lv
Ts
Og
87
88

103
104
105
106
107
108
109
110
111
112
113
114
115
116
117
118
223
218
-
201
173
159

161
141
-
157
140
131
149
136
126
143
128
121
141
128
119
134
125
118
129
125
113
128
116
112
121
116
118
122
137
130
136
-
-
143
-
-
162
-
-
175
-
-
165
-
-
157
-
-

*
La
Ce
Pr
Nd
Pm
Sm
Eu
Gd
Tb
Dy
Ho
Er
Tm
Yb

57
58
59
60
61
62
63
64
65
66
67
68
69
70

180
139
139
163
137
131
176
138
128
174
137
-
173
135
-
172
134
-
168
134
-
169
135
132
168
135
-
167
133
-
166
133
-
165
133
-
164
131
-
170
129
-

**
Ac
Th
Pa
U
Np
Pu
Am
Cm
Bk
Cf
Es
Fm
Md
No

89
90
91
92
93
94
95
96
97
98
99
100
101
102

186
153
140
175
143
136

115

169
138
129

105

170
134
118

104

171
136
116

99

172
135
-
166
135
-
166
136
-
168
139
-
168
140
-
165
140
-
167
-
-
173
139
-
176
-
-

== See also ==
- Atomic radii of the elements (data page)
- Ionization energy
- Electron affinity
- Electron configuration
- Periodic table
