= Transferability (economics) =

Transferability refers to the costs involved in moving goods from one place to another. These include the costs of transportation, the costs of making the goods compliant with the regulations of the shipping destination, and the costs associated with tariffs or duties.

$transferability = \frac{constant}{transportation + regulations + tariffs}$
