= Bond length =

Average distance between two nuclei of chemically bonded atoms

In molecular geometry, bond length or bond distance is defined as the average distance between nuclei of two bonded atoms in a molecule. It is a transferable property of a bond between atoms of fixed types, relatively independent of the rest of the molecule.

== Explanation ==
Bond length is related to bond order: when more electrons participate in bond formation the bond is shorter. Bond length is also inversely related to bond strength and the bond dissociation energy: all other factors being equal, a stronger bond will be shorter. In a bond between two identical atoms, half the bond distance is equal to the covalent radius.

Bond lengths are measured in the solid phase by means of X-ray diffraction, or approximated in the gas phase by microwave spectroscopy. A bond between a given pair of atoms may vary between different molecules. For example, the carbon to hydrogen bonds in methane are different from those in methyl chloride. It is however possible to make generalizations when the general structure is the same.

== Bond lengths of carbon with other elements ==
A table with experimental single bonds for carbon to other elements is given below. Bond lengths are given in picometers. By approximation the bond distance between two different atoms is the sum of the individual covalent radii (these are given in the chemical element articles for each element). As a general trend, bond distances decrease across the row in the periodic table and increase down a group. This trend is identical to that of the atomic radius.

Bond distance of carbon to other elements
Bonded element	Bond length (pm)	Group
H	106–112	group 1
Be	193	group 2
Mg	207	group 2
B	156	group 13
Al	224	group 13
In	216	group 13
C	120–154	group 14
Si	186	group 14
Sn	214	group 14
Pb	229	group 14
N	147–210	group 15
P	187	group 15
As	198	group 15
Sb	220	group 15
Bi	230	group 15
O	143–215	group 16
S	181–255	group 16
Cr	192	group 6
Se	198–271	group 16
Te	205	group 16
Mo	208	group 6
W	206	group 6
F	134	group 17
Cl	176	group 17
Br	193	group 17
I	213	group 17

== Bond lengths in organic compounds ==
The bond length between two atoms in a molecule depends not only on the atoms but also on such factors as the orbital hybridization and the electronic and steric nature of the substituents. The carbon–carbon (C–C) bond length in diamond is 154 pm. It is generally considered the average length for a carbon–carbon single bond, but is also the largest bond length that exists for ordinary carbon covalent bonds. Since one atomic unit of length (i.e., a Bohr radius) is 52.9177 pm, the C–C bond length is 2.91 atomic units, or approximately three Bohr radii long.

Unusually long bond lengths do exist. Current record holder for the longest C-C bond with a length of 180.6 pm is 1,8-Bis(5-hydroxydibenzo[a,d]cycloheptatrien-5-yl)naphthalene, one of many molecules within a category of hexaaryl ethanes, which are derivatives based on hexaphenylethane skeleton. Bond is located between carbons C1 and C2 as depicted in a picture below.

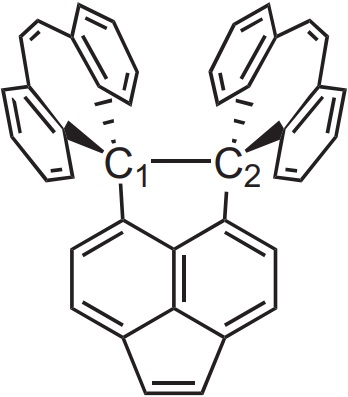
Hexaphenylethane skeleton based derivative containing longest known C-C bond between atoms C1 and C2 with a length of 180.6 pm

Another notable compound with an extraordinary C-C bond length is tricyclobutabenzene, in which a bond length of 160 pm is reported. Longest C-C bond within the cyclobutabenzene category is 174 pm based on X-ray crystallography. In this type of compound the cyclobutane ring would force 90° angles on the carbon atoms connected to the benzene ring where they ordinarily have angles of 120°.

Cyclobutabenzene with a bond length in red of 174 pm

The existence of a very long C–C bond length of up to 290 pm is claimed in a dimer of two tetracyanoethylene dianions, although this concerns a 2-electron-4-center bond. This type of bonding has also been observed in neutral phenalenyl dimers. The bond lengths of these so-called "pancake bonds" are up to 305 pm.

Shorter than average C–C bond distances are also possible: alkenes and alkynes have bond lengths of respectively 133 and 120 pm due to increased s-character of the sigma bond. In benzene all bonds have the same length: 139 pm. Carbon–carbon single bonds increased s-character is also notable in the central bond of diacetylene (137 pm) and that of a certain tetrahedrane dimer (144 pm).

In propionitrile the cyano group withdraws electrons, also resulting in a reduced bond length (144 pm). Squeezing a C–C bond is also possible by application of strain. An unusual organic compound exists called In-methylcyclophane with a very short bond distance of 147 pm for the methyl group being squeezed between a triptycene and a phenyl group. In an in silico experiment a bond distance of 136 pm was estimated for neopentane locked up in fullerene. The smallest theoretical C–C single bond obtained in this study is 131 pm for a hypothetical tetrahedrane derivative.

The same study also estimated that stretching or squeezing the C–C bond in an ethane molecule by 5 pm required 2.8 or 3.5 kJ/mol, respectively. Stretching or squeezing the same bond by 15 pm required an estimated 21.9 or 37.7 kJ/mol.

Bond lengths in organic compounds
C–H	Length (pm)	C–C	Length (pm)	Multiple-bonds	Length (pm)
sp^{3}–H	110	sp^{3}–sp^{3}	154	Benzene	140
sp^{2}–H	109	sp^{3}–sp^{2}	150	Alkene	134
sp–H	108	sp^{2}–sp^{2}	147	Alkyne	120
		sp^{3}–sp	146	Allene	130
		sp^{2}–sp	143		
		sp–sp	137		
