= Transferability (chemistry) =

Assumption that a chemical property will only vary slightly under different circumstances

In chemistry, transferability is the assumption that a chemical property that is associated with an atom or a functional group in a molecule will have a similar (but not identical) value in a variety of different circumstances. Examples of transferable properties include:

- Electronegativity
- Nucleophilicity
- Chemical shifts in NMR spectroscopy
- Characteristic frequencies in Infrared spectroscopy
- Bond length and bond angle
- Bond energy

Transferable properties are distinguished from conserved properties, which are assumed to always have the same value whatever the chemical situation, e.g. standard atomic weight.
