= Allotropes of arsenic =

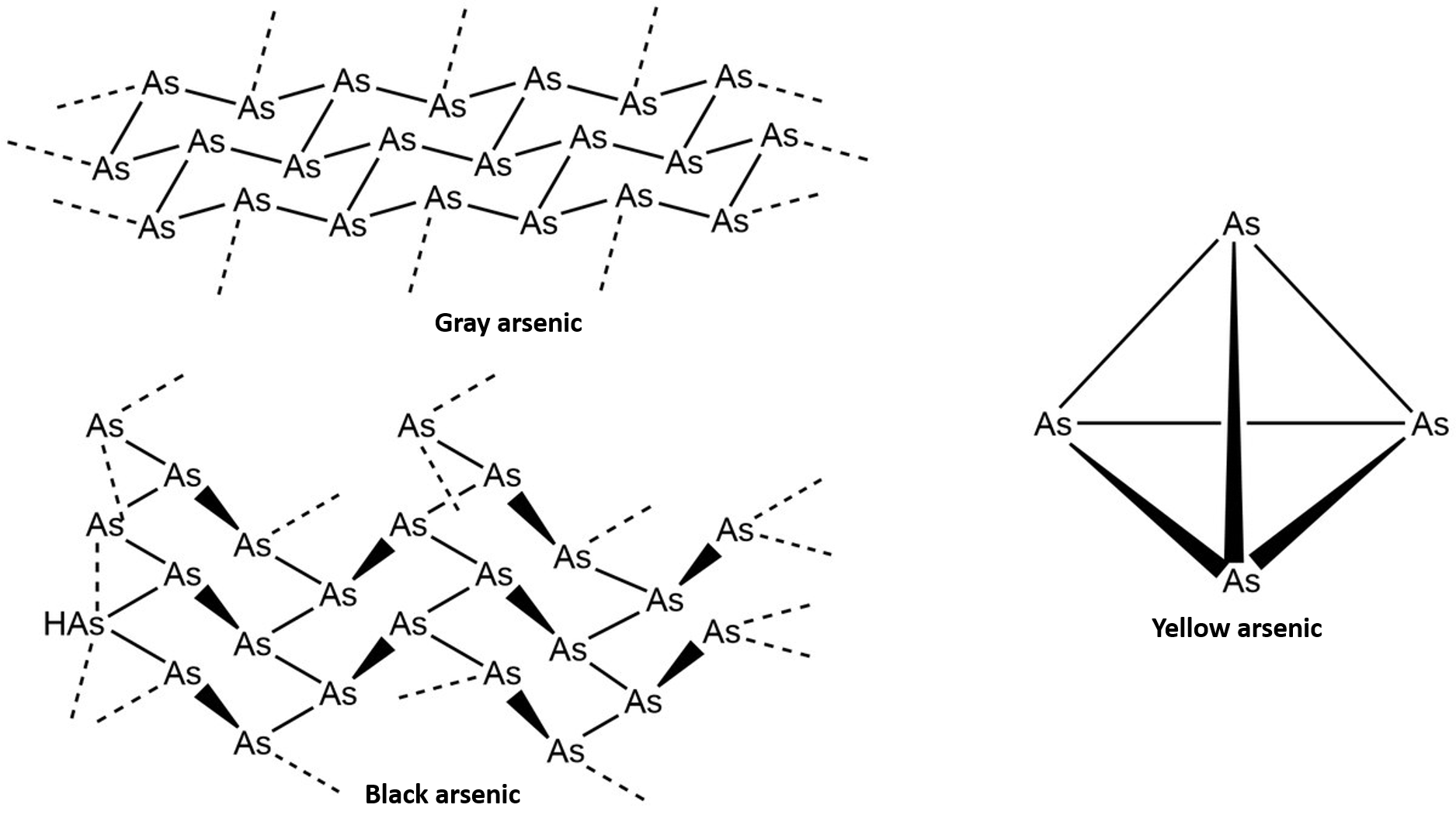
Molecular structures of arsenic allotropes. Top left: Gray (metallic) arsenic, rhombohedral structure. Bottom left: Black arsenic, orthorhombic structure. Right: Yellow arsenic, tetrahedral configuration.

Arsenic in the solid state can be found as gray, black, or yellow allotropes. These various forms feature diverse structural motifs, with yellow arsenic enabling the widest range of reactivity. In particular, reaction of yellow arsenic with main group and transition metal elements results in compounds with wide-ranging structural motifs, with butterfly, sandwich and realgar-type moieties featuring most prominently.

== Gray arsenic ==
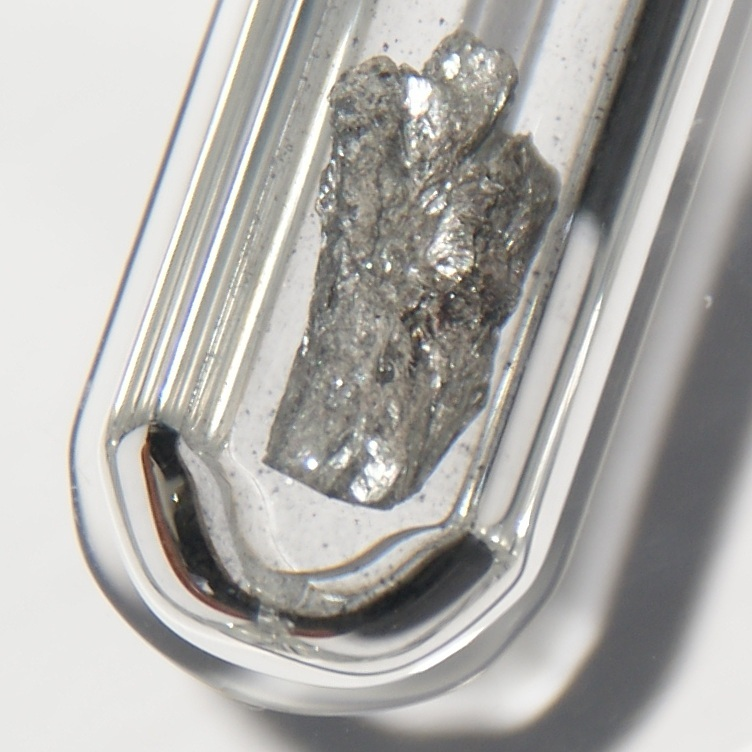
Gray, or metallic arsenic, pictured under an argon atmosphere

Gray arsenic, also called α- or grey arsenic, is the most stable allotrope of the element at room temperature. This soft, brittle allotrope of arsenic has a steel gray, metallic color, and is a good conductor. The crystal structure of α-As is rhombohedral consisting of fused As_{6} rings in chair conformation, forming layers in ABAB… sequence perpendicular to the crystallographic c axis. Within each layer, the nearest neighbour As-As bond distances are 2.517 Å. Each arsenic has three near neighbours in the next layer at a distance of 3.120 Å. Each arsenic is therefore in an distorted octahedral site. Under vacuum at 616 °C, arsenic sublimes mainly in the form of As_{4} molecules with a smaller proportion of As_{2}. Rapid condensation of the vapour onto a cold surface (<200 K), yields the metastable molecular allotrope known as yellow arsenic (As_{4}) which slowly converts to the alpha form if left at room temperature. Condensation of arsenic vapour onto a heated surface generates amorphous black arsenic. The crystalline form of black arsenic can also be isolated, and the amorphous form can be annealed to return to the metallic gray arsenic form. Yellow arsenic can also be returned to the gray allotrope in a facile manner through application of light or by returning the molecule to room temperature.

=== Reactivity ===
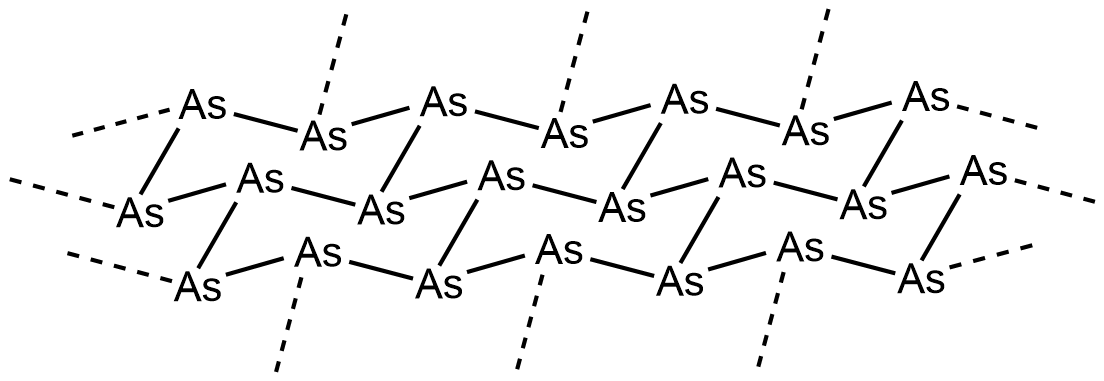
Molecular structure of gray arsenic

Relatively few in-situ reactions have been reported involving gray arsenic due to its low solubility, although it reacts in air to form gaseous As_{2}O_{3} . Two examples of the reactivity of gray arsenic towards transition metals are known. In these reactions, cyclopentadienyl complexes of molybdenum, tungsten and chromium proceed via loss of carbon monoxide to react with gray arsenic and form mono-, di-, and triarsenic compounds.

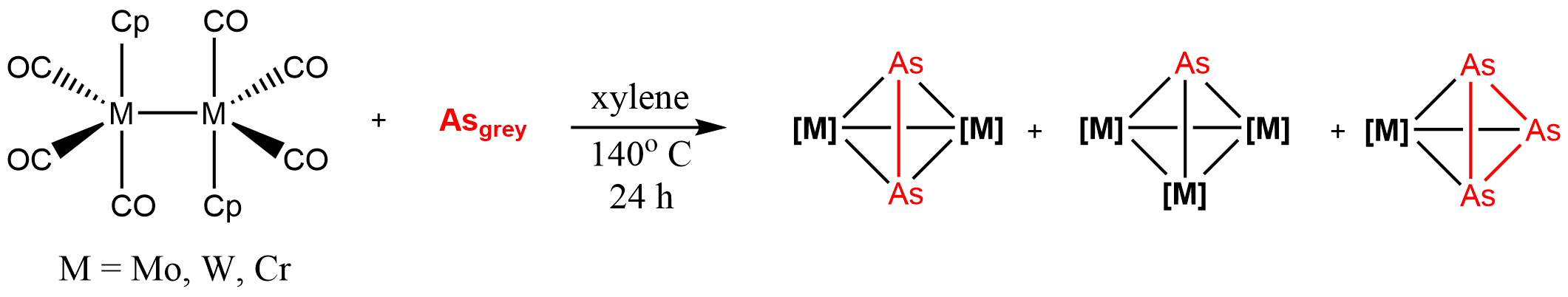
Reactions of gray arsenic. Organometallic complexes of chromium, molybdenum and tungsten react with gray arsenic to form mono-, di- and triarsenic compounds.

== Black arsenic ==
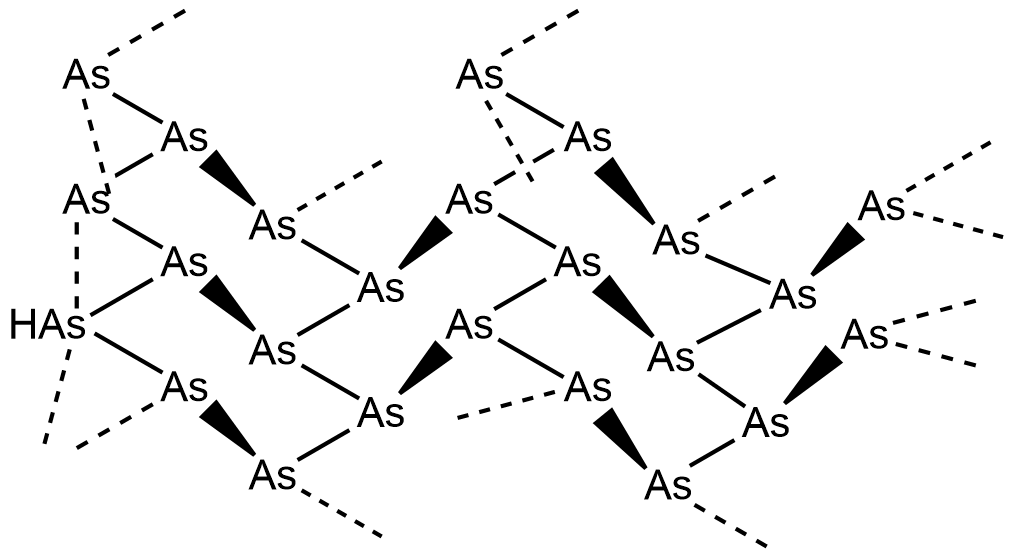
Molecular structure of black arsenic

Black, or amorphous arsenic (chemical formula As_{n}) is synthesized first through the sublimation of gray arsenic followed by condensation onto a heated surface. This structure is thought to be the arsenic analogue of red phosphorus. The structure of black arsenic in its crystalline phase, while not synthesized in its pure form, is by extension analogous to black phosphorus, and takes on an orthorhombic structure built from As_{6} rings. Black arsenic has as-yet been synthesized only in the presence of atomic impurities including mercury, phosphorus, and oxygen, though a pure form of black arsenic was found in the Copiapó region of Chile. Mechanical exfoliation of the mineral found in Chilean caves, arsenolamprite, revealed a molecular structure with high in-phase anisotropy and potential as a semiconducting material.

== Yellow arsenic ==
Molecular structure of yellow arsenic

Rapid condensation of arsenic vapors on to a cold surface results in the formation of yellow arsenic (As_{4}), consisting of four arsenic atoms arranged in a tetrahedral geometry analogous to white phosphorus. Though it is the only soluble form of arsenic known, yellow arsenic is metastable: at room temperature, or in the presence of light, the structure quickly decomposes to adopt the lower-energy configuration of gray arsenic. For this reason, extensive care is required to maintain yellow arsenic in a state suitable for reaction, including rigorous exclusion of light and maintenance of temperatures below −80 °C. Yellow arsenic is the allotrope most suited for reactivity studies, due to its solubility (low, but comparatively large relative to the metallic allotrope) and molecular nature. In comparison to its lighter congener, phosphorus, the reactivity of arsenic is relatively underexplored. Research investigating reactions with arsenic are primarily concerned with the activation of main group and transition metal compounds; in the case of transition metal complexes, As_{4} has demonstrated competent reactivity across the d-block of the periodic table.

=== Reactivity towards main group compounds ===
The first activation of a main group compound by yellow arsenic was reported in 1992 by West and coworkers, involving the reaction of As_{4} with a disilene compound, tetramesityldisilene, to generate a mixture of compounds including a butterfly structural motif of bridging arsenic atoms. Notably, the product mixture obtained in this reaction differs from the analogous reaction with P_{4} that produces the butterfly compound alone, highlighting that the reactivity of yellow arsenic and white phosphorus cannot be considered identical. The first organo-substituted As_{4} compound was produced by Scheer and coworkers in 2016 via reaction with the Cp^{PEt} radical. Analogous to the butterfly compound obtained by the West group, the product obtained in this reaction featured a bridging As_{4} motif that reversibly returned As_{4} and the parent radical in the presence of light or heat. This characteristic makes the Cp^{PEt}_{2}As_{4} complex a uniquely suitable "storage" molecule for yellow arsenic, as it is stable when stored at room temperature in the dark, but can release As_{4} in thermal or photochemical solutions.

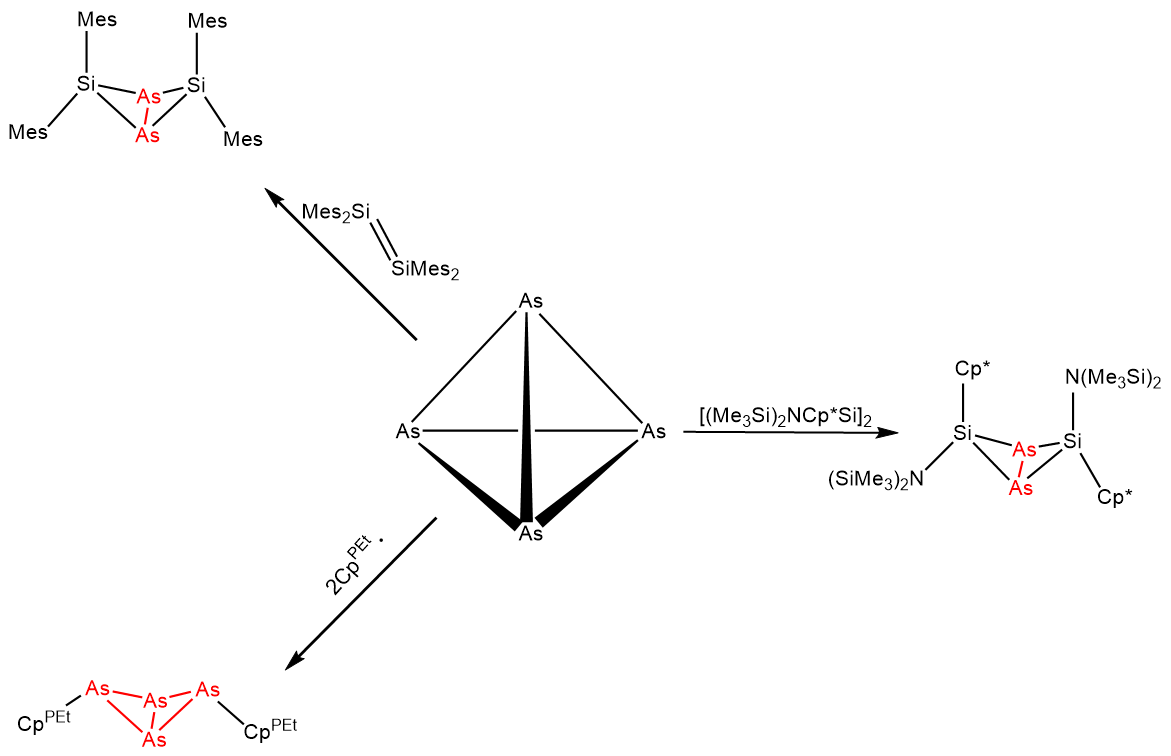
Selected reactions forming butterfly compounds of arsenic and main group elements. Cp^{PEt} = C_{5}(4-EtC_{6}H_{4})_{5}), Cp^{*}=(η^{1}-Me_{5}C_{5})

Other reactions of main group compounds with yellow arsenic have been shown to involve units of arsenic with more than four atoms. In reaction with the silylene compound [PhC(NtBu)_{2}SiN(SiMe_{3})_{2}], an aggregation of As_{4} was observed to form a cage compound of ten arsenic atoms, including a seven-membered arsenic ring at its center.

=== Reactivity towards transition metal compounds ===
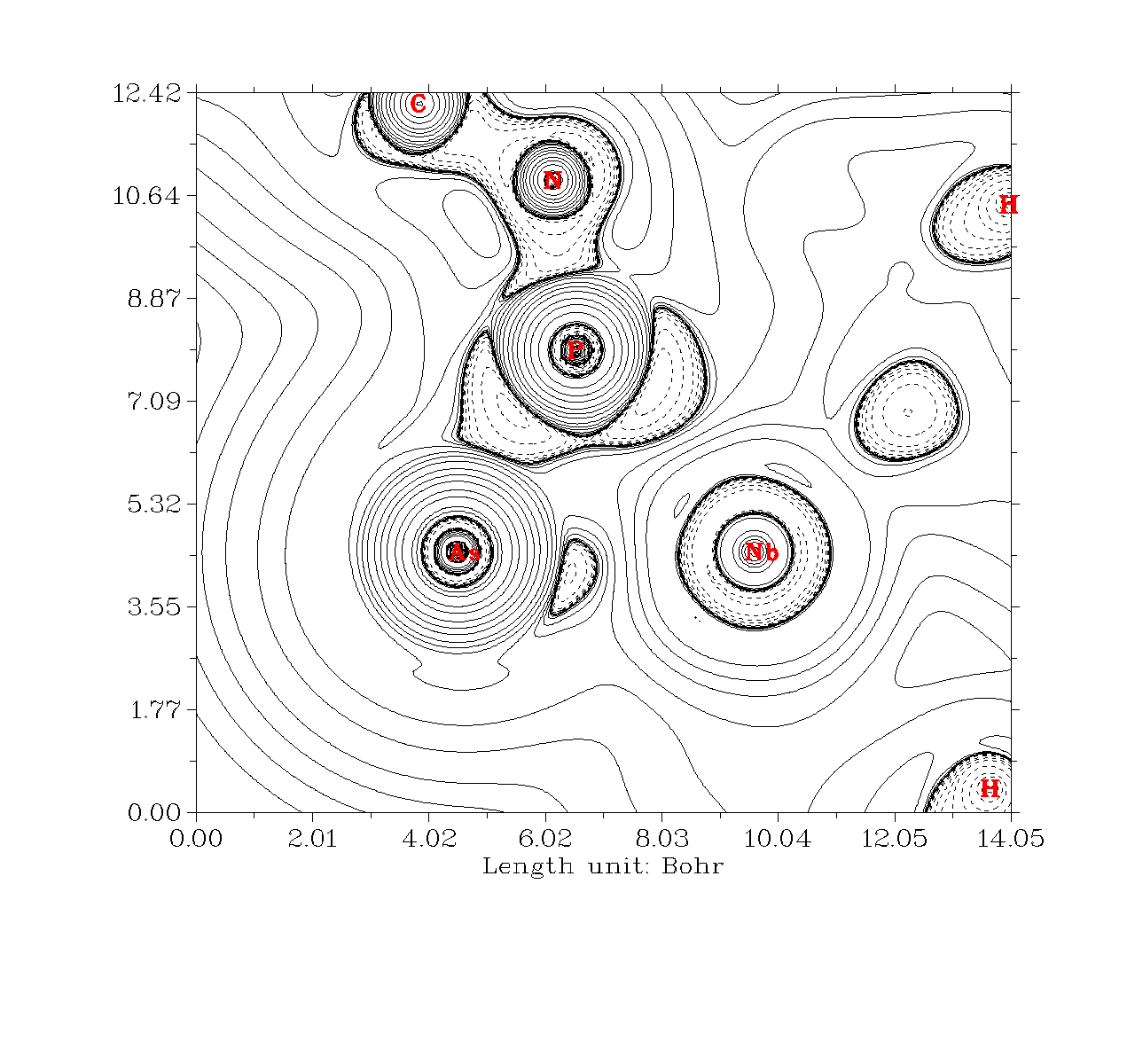
Laplacian of electron density, representing the topology of electron density in a niobium/arsenic/phosphorus complex reported by Spinney et al.

==== Group 4 and 5 metals ====
Among the early (group 4 and 5) transition metal elements, few examples of arsenic activation has been reported to date. Carbon monoxide complexes of zirconium with derivatized cyclopentadienyl ligands were shown to react with yellow arsenic in boiling xylene to release CO and bind the As_{4} moiety in η^{1:1}-fashion. Trace amounts of a zirconium dimer bridged by a (μ,η^{2:2:1}-As^{5})-moiety were also reported in this study, which described the complexes as possible reagents for As_{4} transfer. In group 5, arsenic activation has been more widely explored, with complexes of both niobium and tantalum known. Investigation of the electron density topology in a phosphorus/arsenic/niobium-containing system demonstrated the unique η^{2}-bonding configuration in these complexes, in which an arsenic-phosphorus double bond binds side-on to a niobium center.

==== Group 6 metals ====
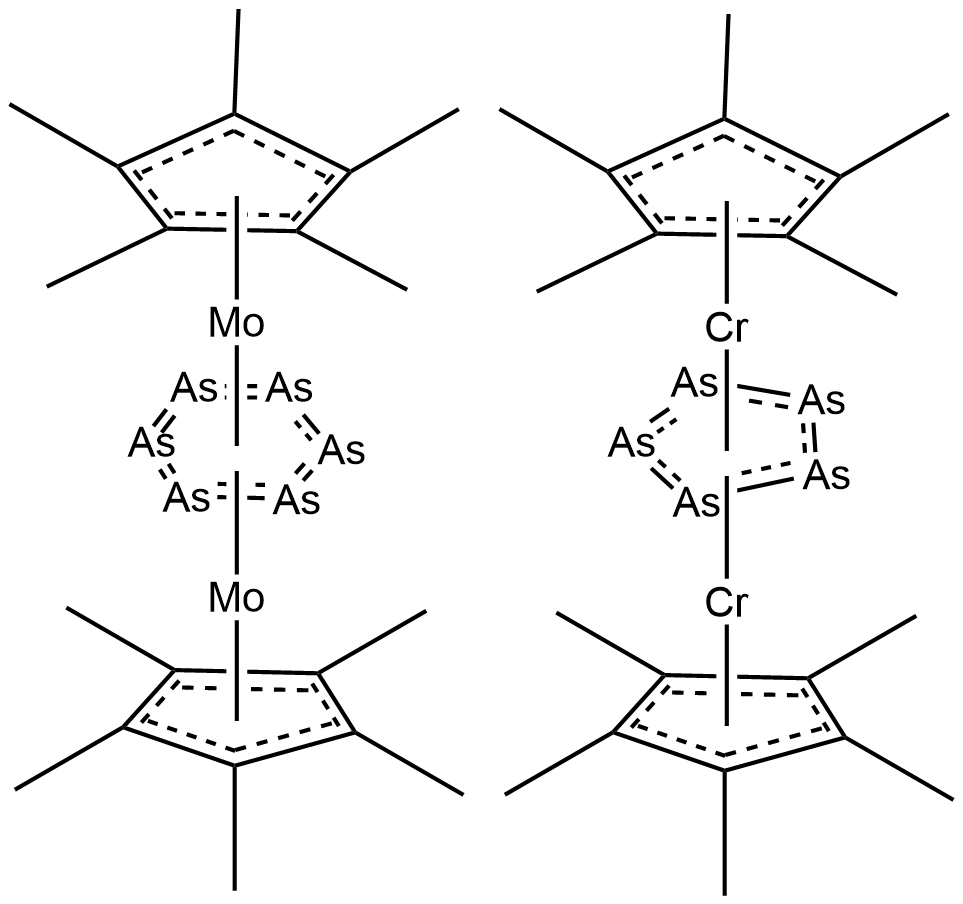
Chromium and molybdenum triple-decker "sandwich" arsenic complexes

Reactions of yellow arsenic with the group 6 transition metals largely proceed through thermolytic carbon monoxide elimination in chromium and molybdenum carbonyl complexes. Notable examples include the formation of triple-decker complexes [(Cp^{R}Mo)_{2}(μ,η^{6}-As_{6})] and [{Cp^{R}Cr}_{2}(μ,η^{5}-As_{5})] via reaction of the corresponding molybdenum and chromium dimers with yellow arsenic. These remarkable structures feature three planar-rings arranged in parallel fashion to result in an idealized D_{5h} point group for the chromium complex. Both of these reactions necessitate harsh reaction conditions like boiling xylene to overcome the high barriers to activation of As_{4}. Conversely, utilization of more sterically demanding ligands on the metal center enabled reactions in milder conditions with molybdenum and chromium. Cummins' Mo(N(tBu)Ar)_{3} catalyst, also known to split the N-N triple bond in dinitrogen, reacts with yellow arsenic to form a terminal arsenic moiety triple-bonded to the metal center - one of only several compounds known to contain a terminal arsenic atom. Complexes with metal-metal multiple bonds also enable mild As_{4} activation parameter. A chromium-chromium quintuply-bonded species reported by Kempe reacts with yellow arsenic to form a crown complex in which the four arsenic atoms form an approximately tetrahedral structure, with each chromium atom bonding to three arsenic atoms.

==== Group 8 and 9 metals ====
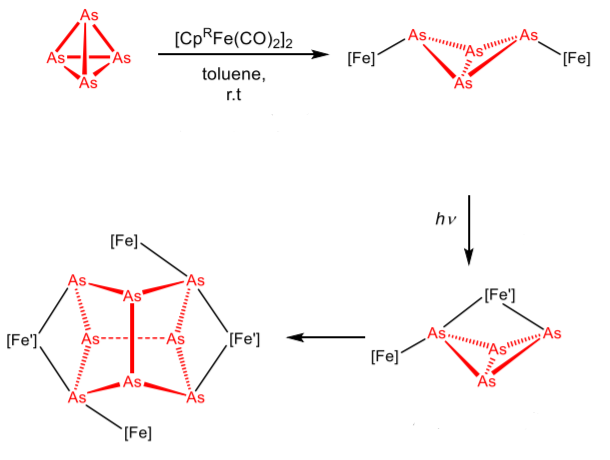
Reactivity of yellow arsenic with iron complexes featuring bulky cyclopentadienyl moieties, resulting in the formation of butterfly complexes followed sequentially by an As_{8} realgar-like central structure linking two iron fragments.

The metals of groups 8 and 9 feature the most extensive library of reactivity with yellow arsenic documented in the scientific literature, with particular focus on reactions of iron and cobalt complexes with As_{4}. Much like the chromium and molybdenum sandwich complexes, (Cp^{R}Fe(CO)_{2}]_{2} complexes of iron react with yellow arsenic to produce analogous bimetallic products featuring "triple-decker" geometry. These reports also detail the isolation of a key intermediate, pentaarsaferrocene ([Cp^{R}Fe(μ^{5}-As_{5})]). This intermediate, isolobal to ferrocene, replaces one of the cyclopentadienyl ligands with a cyclic As_{5} ligand that features As-As bond lengths of 2.312 Å (in line with delocalized As-As double bonds). This "sandwich-forming" reactivity can be meaningfully tuned by introducing bulkier ligands. Modifying the cyclopentadienyl groups with much bulkier derivatives produces a vastly different set of products. First, a butterfly complex with a central As_{4} unit is formed. Irradiation with light leads to further CO elimination and the formation of a bridged butterfly complex, which then rearranges into a unique complex featuring a central As_{8} moiety. This ligand, formally tetraanionic, forms an eight-membered ring bridging four iron atoms in total.

Much of the same reactivity, including formation of butterfly and sandwich compounds, has been described for cobalt complexes in the presence of yellow arsenic. Beyond these compounds, the history of reactivity of cobalt and yellow arsenic dates back to 1978, when Sacconi and coworkers reported the reaction of cobalt tetrafluoroborate and yellow arsenic in the presence of 1,1,1-tris(diphenylphosphinomethyl)ethane. The resulting complex features a cyclic As_{3} moiety bridging two cobalt centers, of which the former is assigned formally as a 3π-electron system. The reaction of [Cp*Co(CO)]_{2} dimer with yellow arsenic was shown by Scherer et al. to produce a wide variety of isolable products, featuring a mixture of linking arsenic moieties including cyclobutane-like and butterfly type complexes. Analogous reactions with rhodium complexes are also known.

==== Group 10 and 11 metals ====
Among the group 10 and 11 elements, nickel and copper feature most prominently in literature reactions with yellow arsenic. Nickel tetrafluoroborate salts react analogously to cobalt complexes in the presence of triphos to form a sandwich structure with a central cyclic As_{3} moiety. Much like iron, the reaction of nickel cyclopentadienyl carbonyl complexes with As_{4} yields a variety of bi- and multi-metallic products depending on the size of the attending ligands, though the nature and geometric structure of these compounds differ from those observed with iron. These include trimers with bridging As_{4} and As_{5} moieties in cubane structural arrangements when smaller Cp ligands are employed, and distorted hexagonal prism complexes with two nickel fragments and four arsenic atoms when bulkier Cp groups are introduced.

The reaction of the copper complex [L^{2}Cu(NCMe)] (L^{2} = [{N(C_{6}H_{3}iPr_{2}-2,6)C(Me)}_{2}CH]) with yellow arsenic yields the As_{4}-bridged dimer [{L^{2}Cu}_{2}- (μ,η^{2:2}-As_{4})]. The four-atom arsenic moiety in this complex was deemed to be "intact" yellow arsenic through the use of density functional theory calculations determining the change in bond critical points between the free and bound arsenic molecules. Specifically, only a small shift was observed in the bond critical points between arsenic atoms involved in binding to copper; the remaining bond critical points were very similar to free yellow arsenic.

== See also ==
- Allotropes of phosphorus
