= Dispersion stabilized molecules =

Dispersion stabilized molecules are molecules where the London dispersion force (LDF), a non-covalent attractive force between atoms and molecules, plays a significant role in promoting the molecule's stability. Distinct from steric hindrance, dispersion stabilization has only recently been considered in depth by organic and inorganic chemists after earlier gaining prominence in protein science and supramolecular chemistry. Although usually weaker than covalent bonding and other forms of non-covalent interactions like hydrogen bonding, dispersion forces are known to be a significant if not dominating stabilizing force in certain organic, inorganic, and main group molecules, stabilizing otherwise reactive moieties and exotic bonding.

== Stabilization through dispersion ==
Dispersion interactions are a stabilizing force arising from quantum mechanical electron correlation. Although quantum mechanical in nature, the energy of dispersion interactions can be approximated classically, showing a R^{−6} dependence on the distance between two atoms. This distance dependence helps make dispersion interactions weak for individual atoms and has led to dispersion effects being historically neglected in molecular chemistry. However, in larger molecules dispersion effects can become significant. Dispersion forces in molecular chemistry are most apparent in molecules with large, bulky functional groups. Dispersion stabilization is often signified by atomic contacts below their van der Waals radii in a molecule's crystal structure. Especially for H•••H contacts between bulky, rigid, and polarizable groups, short contacts may indicate that a dispersion force is overcoming the Pauli repulsion present between the two H atoms.

Dispersion forces stabilizing a reactive moiety within a molecule is distinct from using steric bulk to protect that reactive moiety. Adding "steric hindrance" to a molecule's reactive site through bulky groups is a common strategy in molecular chemistry to stabilize reactive moieties within a molecule. In this case bulky ligands like terphenyls, bulky alkoxides, aryl-substituted NHCs, etc. serve as a protective wrapper on the molecule. Under the steric hindrance model, the filled orbitals of a bulky group repel other molecules and/or functional groups through Pauli repulsion. These bulky groups inhibit the approach to a molecule's reactive site, kinetically stabilizing the molecule. By contrast dispersion stabilization occurs when these bulky ligands form energetically favorable non-covalent interactions. In molecules where dispersion forces are a dominant factor, the attractive interactions between bulky groups is greater than repulsive interactions between the groups, providing overall thermodynamic stability to the molecule. Although dispersion stabilization and steric hindrance are distinct, dispersion stabilized molecules frequently benefit from steric protection of the molecule's reactive moiety.

== Molecular dispersion in computational chemistry ==
Advances in quantum computational chemistry methods have allowed for faster theoretical examination of dispersion effects in molecular chemistry. Standard density functional theory (DFT) does not account well for dispersion effects, but corrections like the popular -D3 correction can be used with DFT to provide efficient dispersion energy corrections. The -D3 correction is a force field type correction that does not take into account electronic structure, but nonetheless the popular correction works with many functionals and produces values that often fall within 5-10% of more sophisticated calculations. The "gold standard" computational method are coupled-cluster methods like CCSD(T) that account for the electron correlation origin of dispersion interactions.

Richard Bader's theory of Atoms in Molecules (AIM) has also been invoked to computationally identify dispersion interactions. Bader proposed that a bond critical point, or a critical point in the electron density, between two electronically similar, closed-shell hydrogen atoms is evidence for a stabilizing dispersion interaction between those two atoms. Although there is controversy about accepting bond critical points as evidence for net attractive interactions, AIM analysis has been invoked by different research groups to show dispersion effects in a variety of molecules.

Alternative computational analysis methods include Yang's electron density based non-covalent interaction (NCI) analysis, and the local energy decomposition (LED) analysis to produce a dispersion interaction density (DID) plot.

== Example molecules ==
=== Organic chemistry ===
Dispersion stabilization explains the reactivity patterns of bulky hydrocarbon radicals. •CPh3 radicals have been known since 1900. In the mid-1960s, the dimer form of the radical was observed, and instead of forming the expected Ph_{3}CCPh_{3} product, the radical instead undergoes head to tail addition. By contrast, adding two ^{t}Bu groups to the meta positions on the phenyl rings causes the radical to readily dimerize to (3,5-^{t}Bu_{2}H_{3}C_{6})_{3}C–C(C_{6}H_{3}-3,5-^{t}Bu_{2})_{3}. Initially this discovery puzzled researchers because •CPh3 head-to-tail addition seemed to suggest steric repulsion disfavored direct addition; however, the more sterically crowded molecule underwent head-to-head addition. More recently, computational analysis has shown the formation of the tBu substituted dimer to be stabilized through dispersion interactions. The study suggests that dispersion interactions between ^{t}Bu groups provide ~60kcal/mol of stabilization to the molecule, enough to overcome the unfavorable steric interactions from the additional ^{t}Bu groups. Further, the dimer contains a 1.67 Å C-C single bond, much longer than the canonical 1.54 Å C-C single bond. Despite the long C-C bond, the molecule remains stable at room temperature through dispersion based stability.

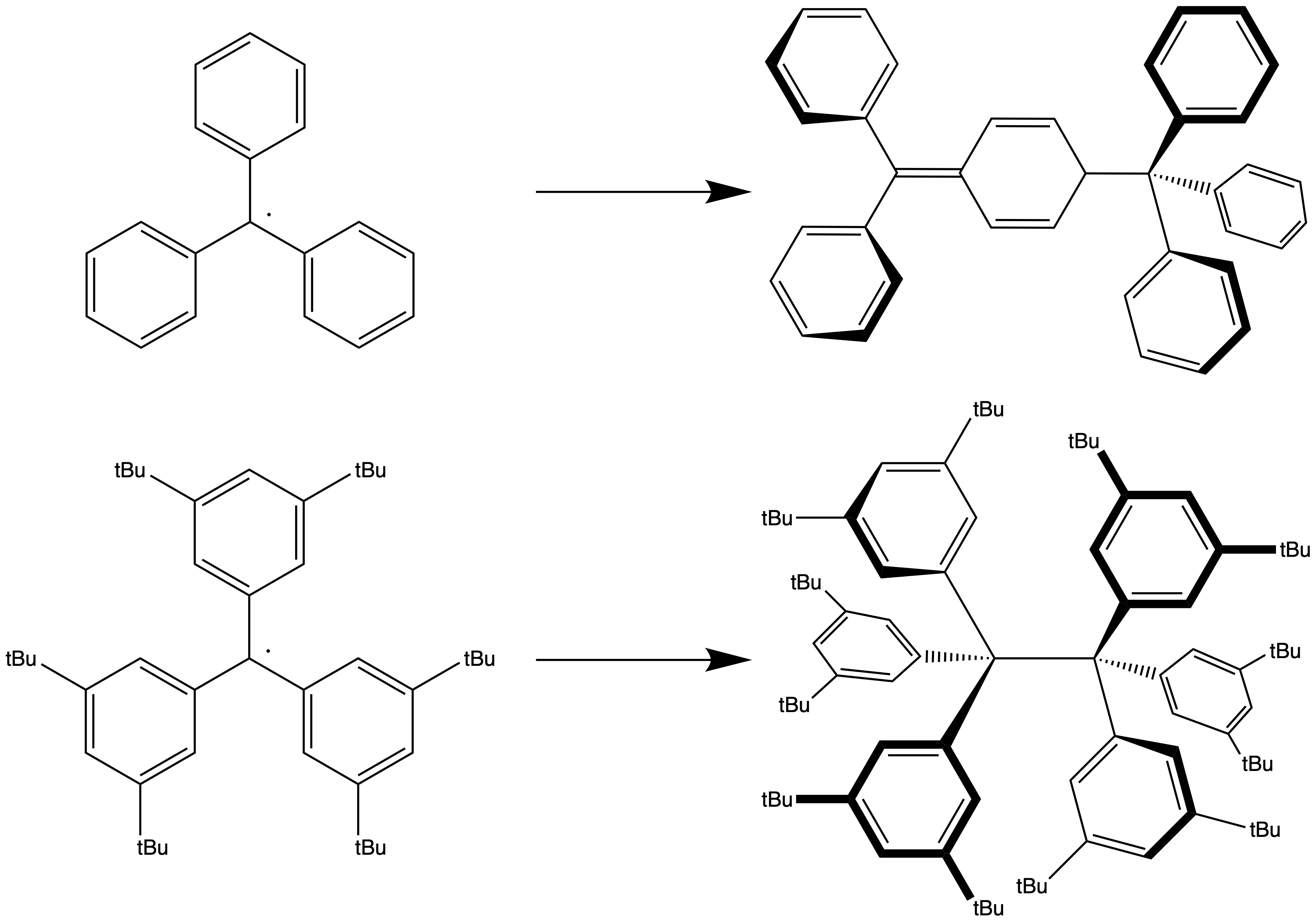
Formation of substituted hexaphenylethane from radical monomers. Increased steric bulk promotes head-to-head addition.

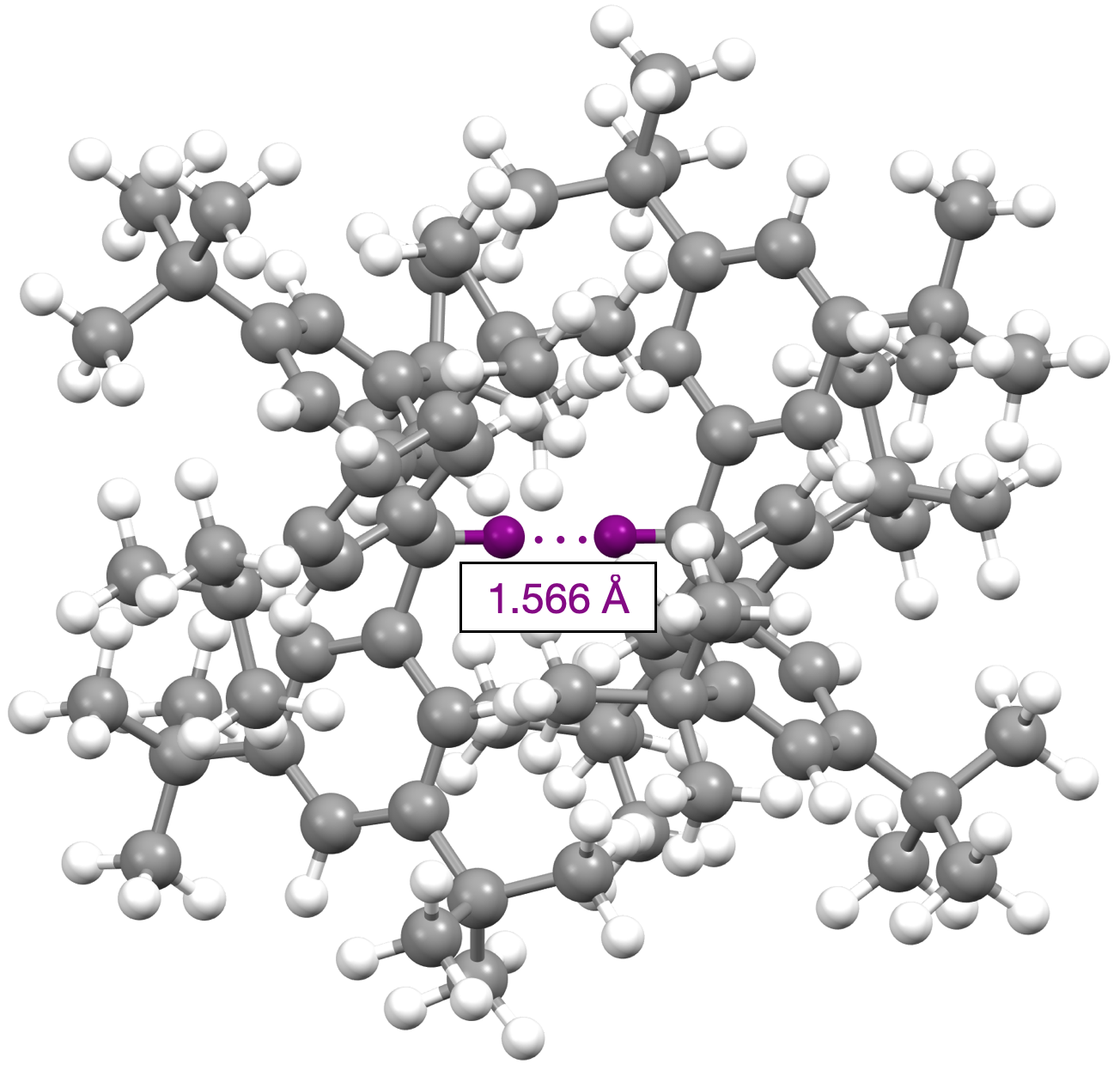
[(3,5-^{t}Bu_{2}H_{3}C_{6})_{3}CH]_{2} with the short contact between hydrogens highlighted in purple.

Beyond just the ^{t}Bu substituted hexaphenylethane, Schriener and coworkers have synthesized new molecules with "dispersion energy donors" to form both long C-C bonds and short H•••H contacts. The effect of dispersion stabilization was further probed with a series of meta-substituted hexaphenylethane molecules substituted with Me, ^{i}Pr, ^{t}Bu, Cy, and adamantyl groups. Of these molecules, only the ^{t}Bu and adamantyl analogs were observed to form the head-to-head dimer, showing the sensitivity of dispersion stabilization to rigid, polarizable substituents. Dispersion stabilization has additionally been used to stabilize intermolecular contacts. When the (3,5-^{t}Bu_{2}H_{3}C_{6})_{3}CH molecule dimerizes to form [(3,5-^{t}Bu_{2}H_{3}C_{6})_{3}CH]_{2}, stabilizing interactions between ^{t}Bu groups bring the central pair of hydrogens to a contact distance of 1.566Å as determined by neutron diffraction. This distance is well within the combined van der Waals radii of the two H atoms, and at the time was the shortest reported H•••H contact.

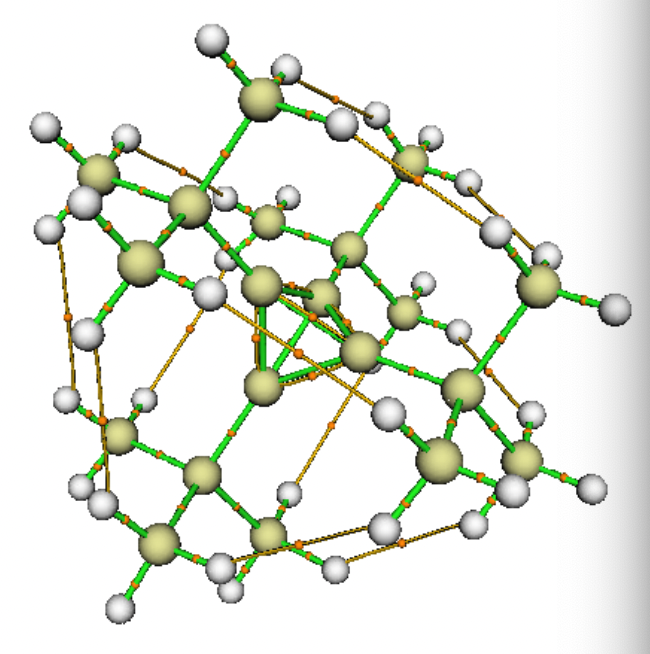
The bond critical points in (C^{t}Bu)_{4} based on AIM analysis. The critical points between H atoms on the ^{t}Bu groups is possible evidence for dispersion stabilization.

Researchers have posited that the stability of the bulky hydrocarbon tetra(tert-butyl)tetrahedrane is in part from dispersion forces. Originally, the molecule's thermal stability in air up to 135 °C was attributed to the corset effect, wherein any stability gained by elongating a C-C bond to release ring strain would be countered by increased repulsion between the remaining ^{t}Bu groups. Although the corset effect is the dominant force driving stability, this explanation has been recently supplemented with calculations that show the ^{t}Bu groups provide 3.1 kcal/mol of stability to the molecule.

=== Inorganic chemistry ===
Dispersion forces can stabilize reactive organometallic molecules by using bulky ligands in metal complexes. The first two-coordinate linear Cu(II) complex, Cu{N(SiMe_{3})Dipp}_{2} (Dipp = C_{6}H_{5}-2,6^{i}Pr_{2}), was prepared by combining a 1:1 ratio of LiN(SiMe_{3})Dipp and CuCl. The mechanism of this reaction is unknown, but the net result is Cu disproportionation to form the Cu(II) complex and Cu metal. The authors suggest that a dispersion stabilization of about 25 kcal/mol from the bulky ligands assists in the initial disproportionation reaction and that this stabilization prevents crystals of the complex from decomposing via further disproportionation to DippN=NDipp, N-(SiMe_{3})_{2}Dipp, and Cu metal. The complex's eclipsed ligand conformation further suggests that dispersion stabilizes the low coordinate complex.

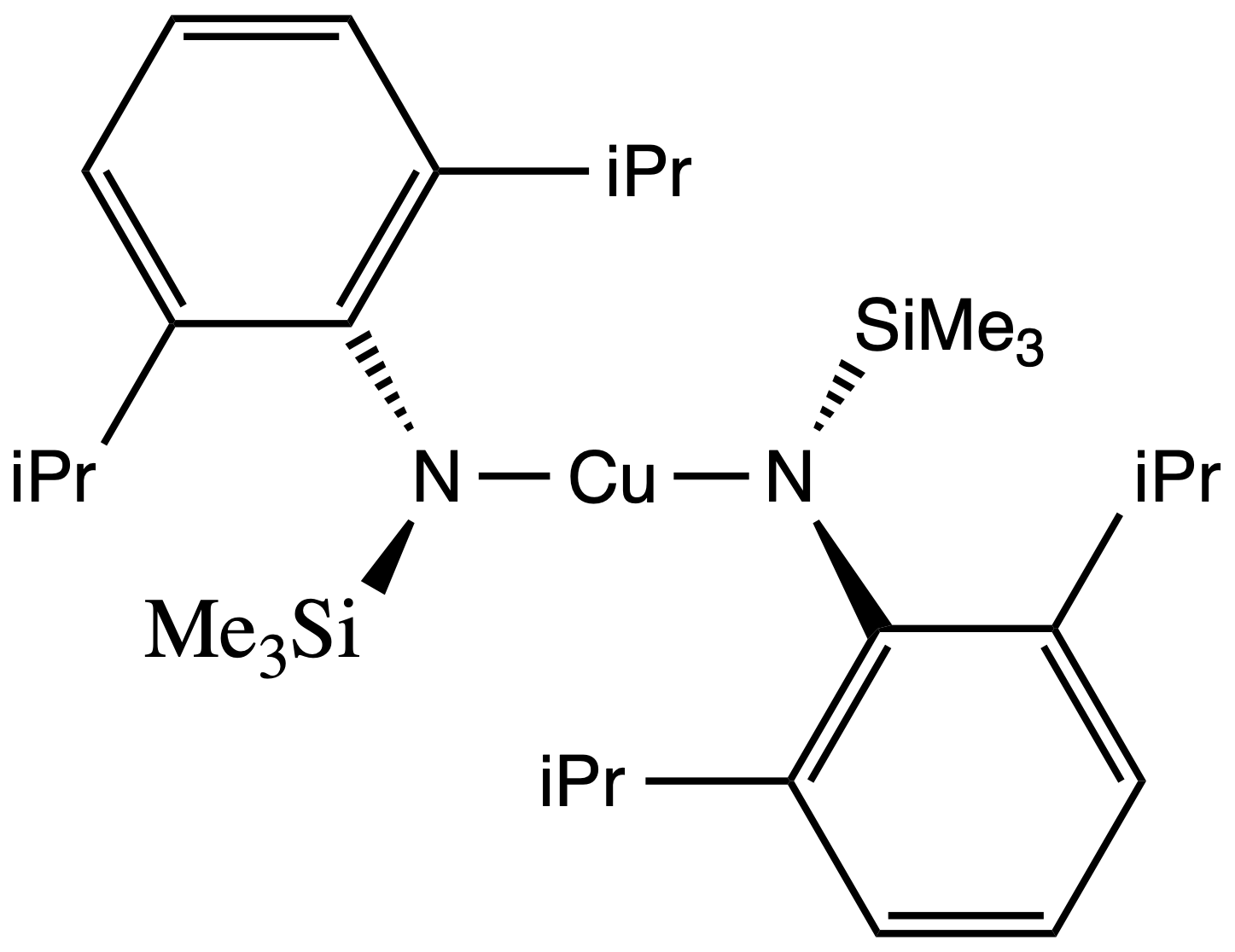

Metal tetranorbornyls, M(nor)_{4} (1-nor = 4bicyclo[2.2.1]hept-1-yl, M = Fe, Co), benefit from stability imparted by dispersion. The compounds display high stability for a formally 4+ oxidation state metal center, which has traditionally been attributed to unfavorable β-elimination. Computational work has determined that the close norbornyl contacts are worth -45.9 kcal/mol of energy, providing significant stabilization to the molecule.

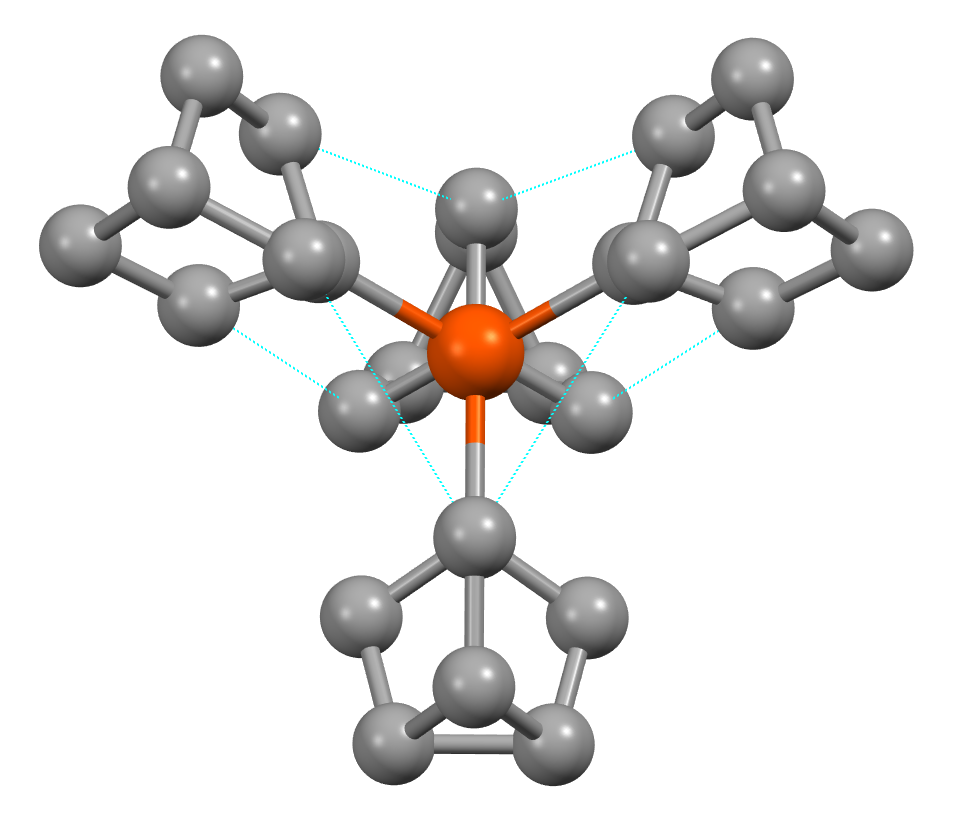
Molecular structure of Fe(nor)_{4} with hydrogens omitted. The short contacts (less than sum of van der Waal radii) between carbon atoms that could indicate dispersion stabilization shown in blue.

=== Main group chemistry ===
Researches have used dispersion stabilization to promote unusual main group bonding. Dispersion forces have been shown to stabilize a cyclic silylated plumbylene dimer, which shows different Pb-Pb bonding than in the parent parent diplumbene (Pb_{2}H_{4}). The crystal structure of the silylated plumbylene dimer has different geometries about each Pb atom, indicating that the molecule forms a singular donor-acceptor interaction. By contrast, the Pb atoms in Pb_{2}H_{4} participate in a double donor-acceptor interaction giving the molecule a trans-bent structure. Computational investigations reveal that the silylated dimer has roughly twice the bond dissociation energy of parent diplumbene Pb_{2}H_{4} despite the parent diplumbene having a higher Wiberg Bond Index. The authors suggest through DFT calculations that dispersion forces between bulky trimethylsilyl groups determine the dimer's conformation.

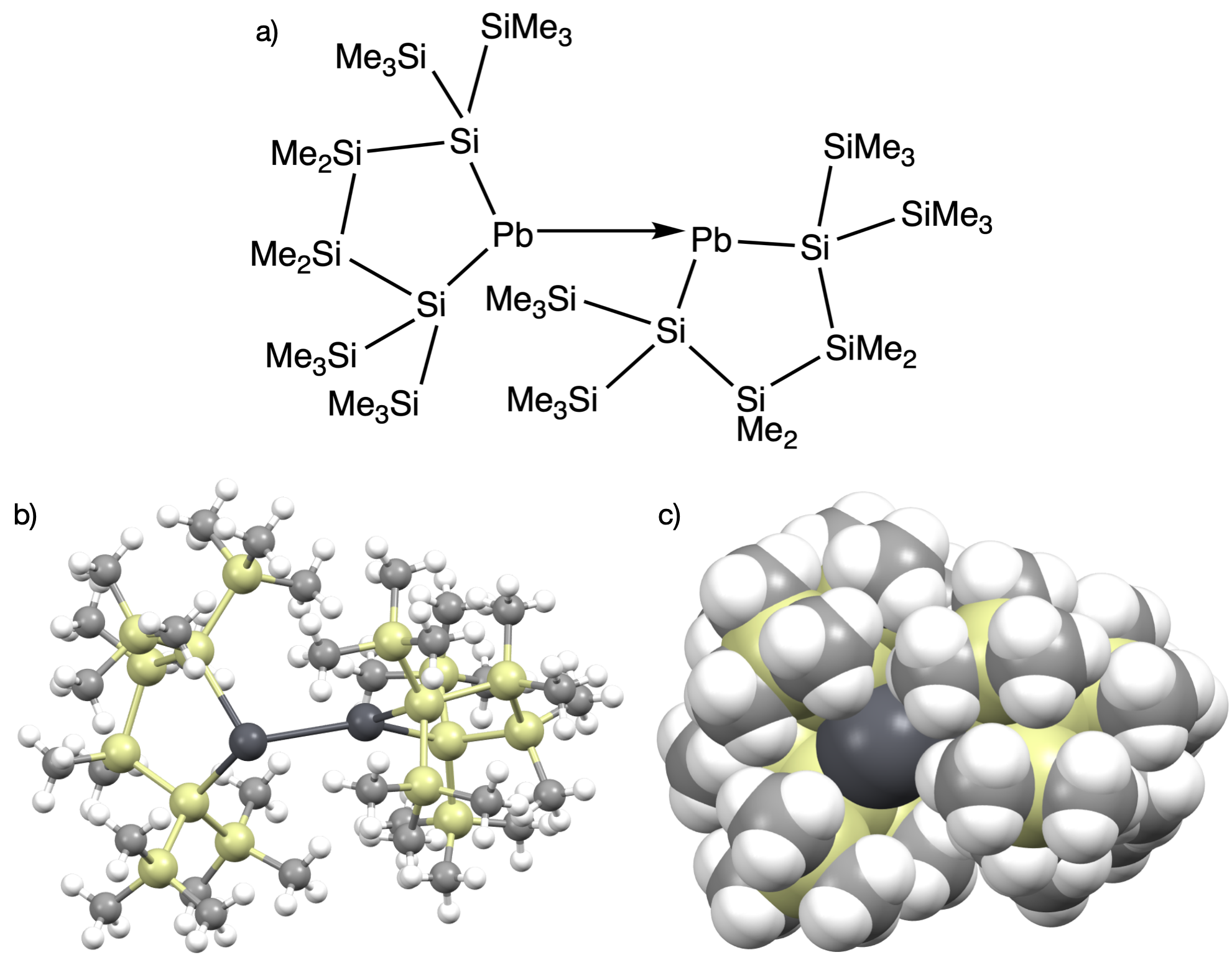
Three representations of the plumbylene dimer. a) A canonical Lewis structure with two resonance contributors. b) A ball and stick diagram showing the asymmetric geometries about the Pb atoms c) A spacefill model showing how the proximity of bulky trimethylsilyl groups

Dispersion has been implicated in stabilizing a Ga-substituted doubly bonded dipnictenes of the form [L(X)Ga]_{2}E_{2} where E = As, Sb, Bi and L = C[C(Me)N(2,6-^{i}Pr_{2}-C_{6}H_{3}). Researchers synthesized the As version of the molecule and computationally analyzed the full series. By calculating the energy of the molecules with and without dispersion, it was determined that dispersion nearly doubles the dimer's enthalpic stabilization when formed from the monomer. In this case, dispersion couples with electronics to provide stability to the molecule.

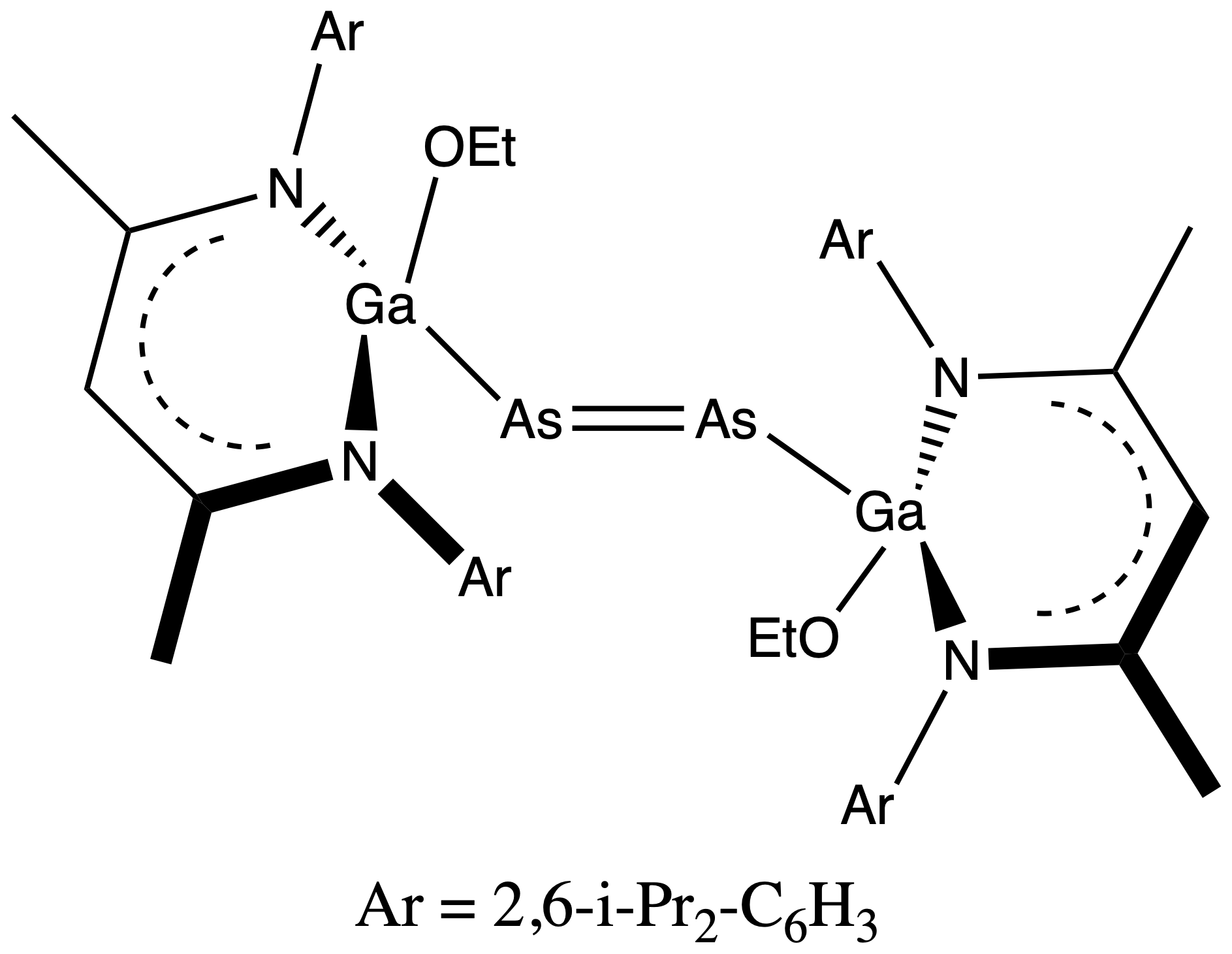

The thermal stability of an extended Si-Si bond in ^{t}Bu_{3}SiSi^{t}Bu_{3}, or superdisilane, has also been attributed to dispersion interactions. Superdisilane has a Si-Si bond length of 2.697Å in the solid state, significantly extended compared to the gas phase Si-Si bond length of 2.331Å in the parent disilane H_{3}SiSiH_{3}. Despite the long bond length, superdisilane exhibits thermal stability up to 323K. Dispersion forces keep the molecule inert even while its core Si-Si bond lengthens. Similarly, the longest known Ge-Ge bond is found in ^{t}Bu_{3}GeGe^{t}Bu_{3} and is also facilitated by dispersion stabilization.

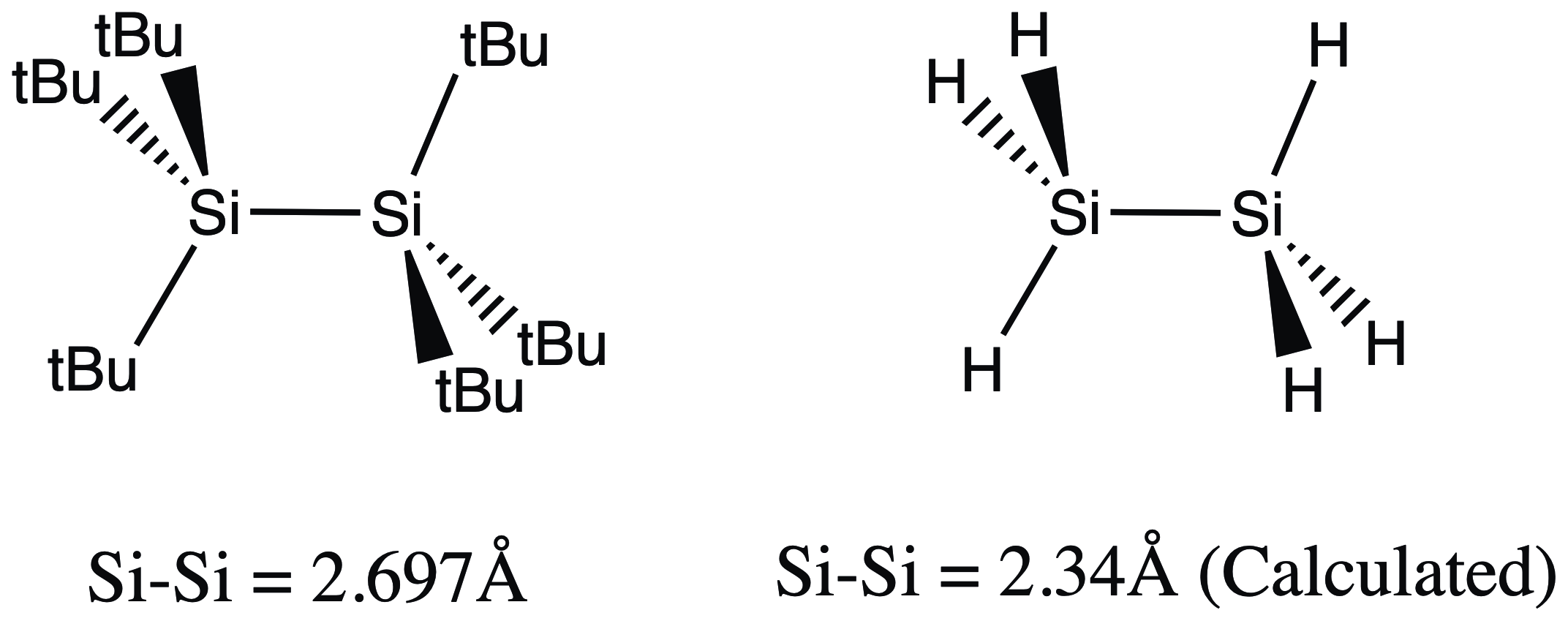

Dispersion stabilization has also been invoked for (^{t}BuC)_{3}P, a main group analog of a hydrocarbon tetrahedrane. Monophosphatetrahedrane, (^{t}BuC)_{3}P, displays greater thermal stability than diphosphatetrahedrane, (^{t}BuCP)_{2}, which decomposes at just -32 °C. The additional stability has been attributed to dispersion interactions between the adjacent, bulky ^{t}Bu groups. Through computational analysis, the authors identified 9 H-H interactions that each provide -0.7 kcal/mol of energy, overcoming the steric penalty of bringing the ^{t}Bu groups together. Geometry optimizations with ^{t}Bu groups swapped for less bulky hydrogens cause significant molecule shape change, indicating that dispersion plays a significant role in stabilizing the molecule's structure.

== Applications ==
Dispersion stabilized molecules are an active area of research. Presently dispersion interactions have mostly been examined after the synthesis of molecules, but molecular design with dispersion effects in mind has generated some excitement for potential future applications. The dispersion interaction effect has been compared to the emerging work on frustrated Lewis pairs, and there is speculation that dispersion could be useful in future catalysis.
