= C38H30 =

The molecular formula C_{38}H_{30} (molar mass: 486.64 g/mol, exact mass: 486.2348 u) may refer to:

- Hexaphenylethane
- Gomberg's dimer
