= Gomberg reaction =

Gomberg reaction may refer to:

- Gomberg–Bachmann reaction, an aryl–aryl coupling reaction via a diazonium salt
- Gomberg radical reaction, forming a triphenylmethyl radical by treating triphenylmethyl chloride with certain metals

== See also ==
- Moses Gomberg (1866–1947), scientist whom the reaction names honor
