= Triphenylcarbenium =

Chemical compound

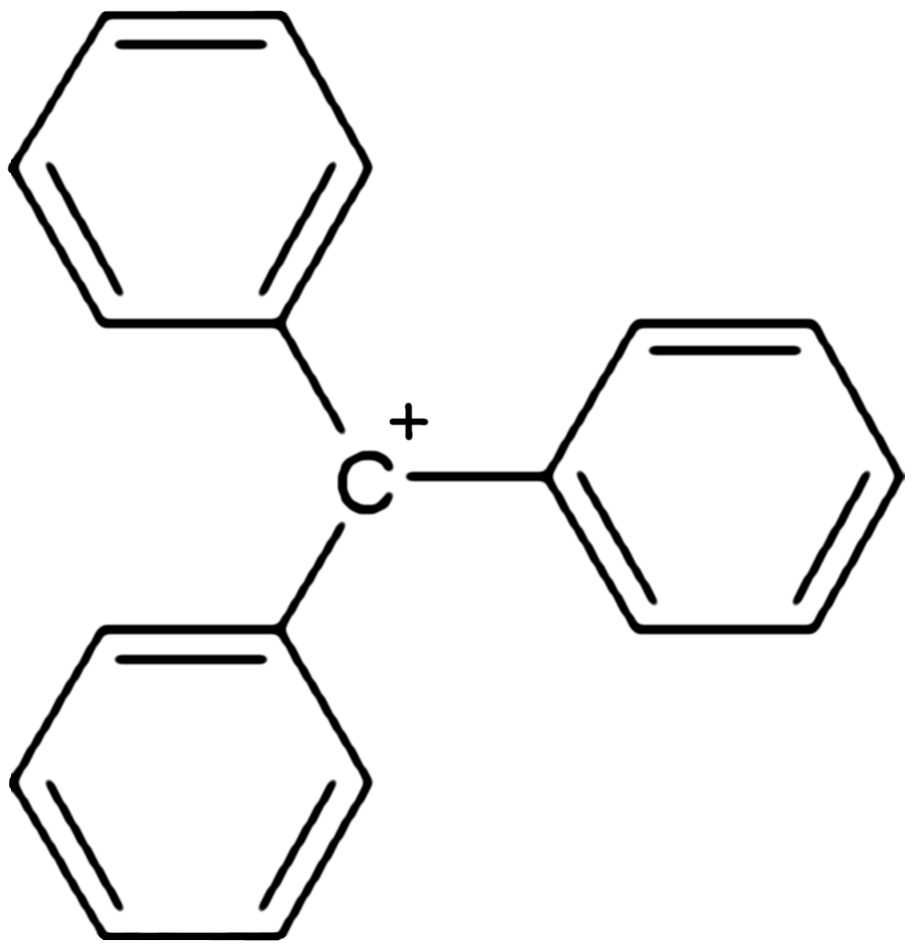
Triphenylcarbenium

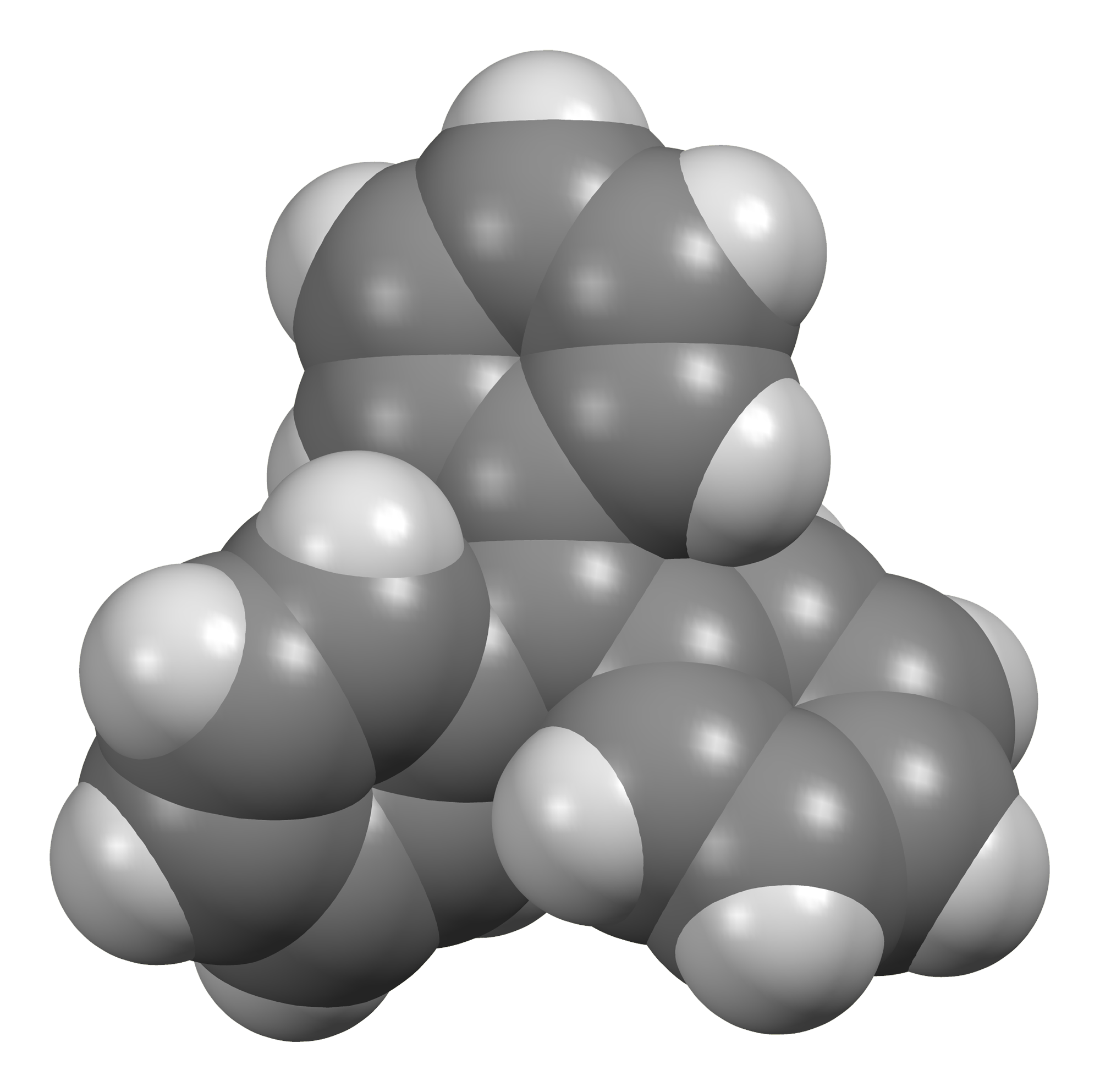
Space-filling model of the Ph_{3}C^{+} ion

In chemistry, triphenylcarbenium, triphenylmethyl cation, tritylium, or trityl cation is an ion with formula [C_{19}H_{15}]^{+} or (C_{6}H_{5})_{3}C^{+}, consisting of a carbon atom with a positive charge connected to three phenyl groups. It is a charged version of the triphenylmethyl radical (C_{6}H_{5})_{3}C•. The name is often abbreviated to triphenylmethyl or trityl in salts, although these names also denote the chemical group in compounds like triphenylmethyl chloride that do not contain the cation.

Triphenylcarbenium is a relatively stable carbenium ion, because the positive charge is partially distributed among 10 of the carbon atoms (the 3 carbon atoms in the ortho and para positions of each of the three phenyl groups, plus the central carbon atom).

== Derivatives ==
The cation exists in important chemical reagents and catalysts such as triphenylmethyl hexafluorophosphate [(C_{6}H_{5})_{3}C]^{+}[PF_{6}]^{−}. Related salts are known with diverse anions including tetrafluoroborate ([BF_{4}]^{−}), hexachloroantimonate ([SbCl_{6}]^{−}), and perchlorate ([ClO_{4}]^{−}). This and other similar cations can be obtained as intensely colored solutions by dissolving aryl-substituted methanols in concentrated sulfuric acid. Derivatives of this cation include, for example, perchlorotriphenylcarbenium (C_{6}Cl_{5})_{3}C^{+}.

=== Triarylmethane dyes ===
Triarylmethane dyes are derivatives that are stabilized versions of the trityl cation. They are water-soluble and are often obtained as the chloride salts. These dyes have strong electron donor groups, often amines, at the p-positions of two or three of the aryl groups.

Triarylmethane dyes

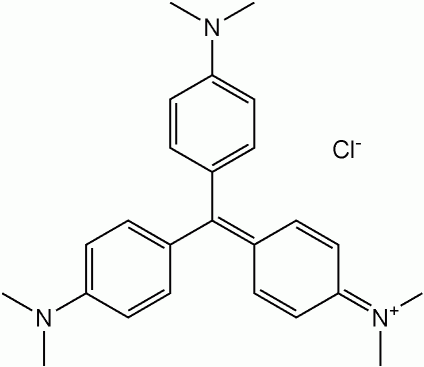
Crystal violet.

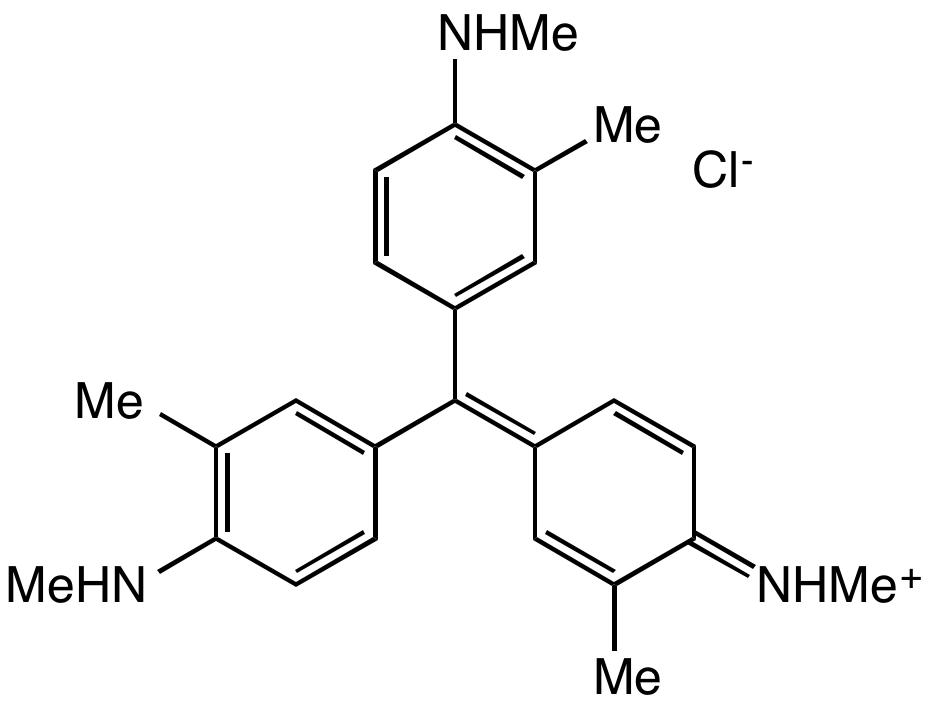
New fuchsine dye.

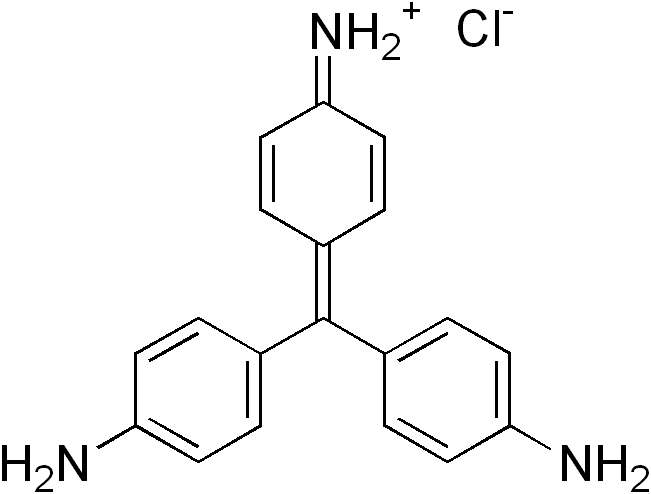
Pararosaniline

== See also ==
- Triphenylmethane (C_{6}H_{5})_{3}CH
- Triphenylmethanol (C_{6}H_{5})_{3}COH
