= C19H15 =

The molecular formula C_{19}H_{15} may refer to:

- Triphenylcarbenium (triphenylmethyl cation), an ion consisting of a carbon atom with a positive charge connected to three phenyl groups
- Triphenylmethyl radical, a persistent radical and the first radical ever described in organic chemistry
