= Triphenylmethyl hexafluorophosphate =

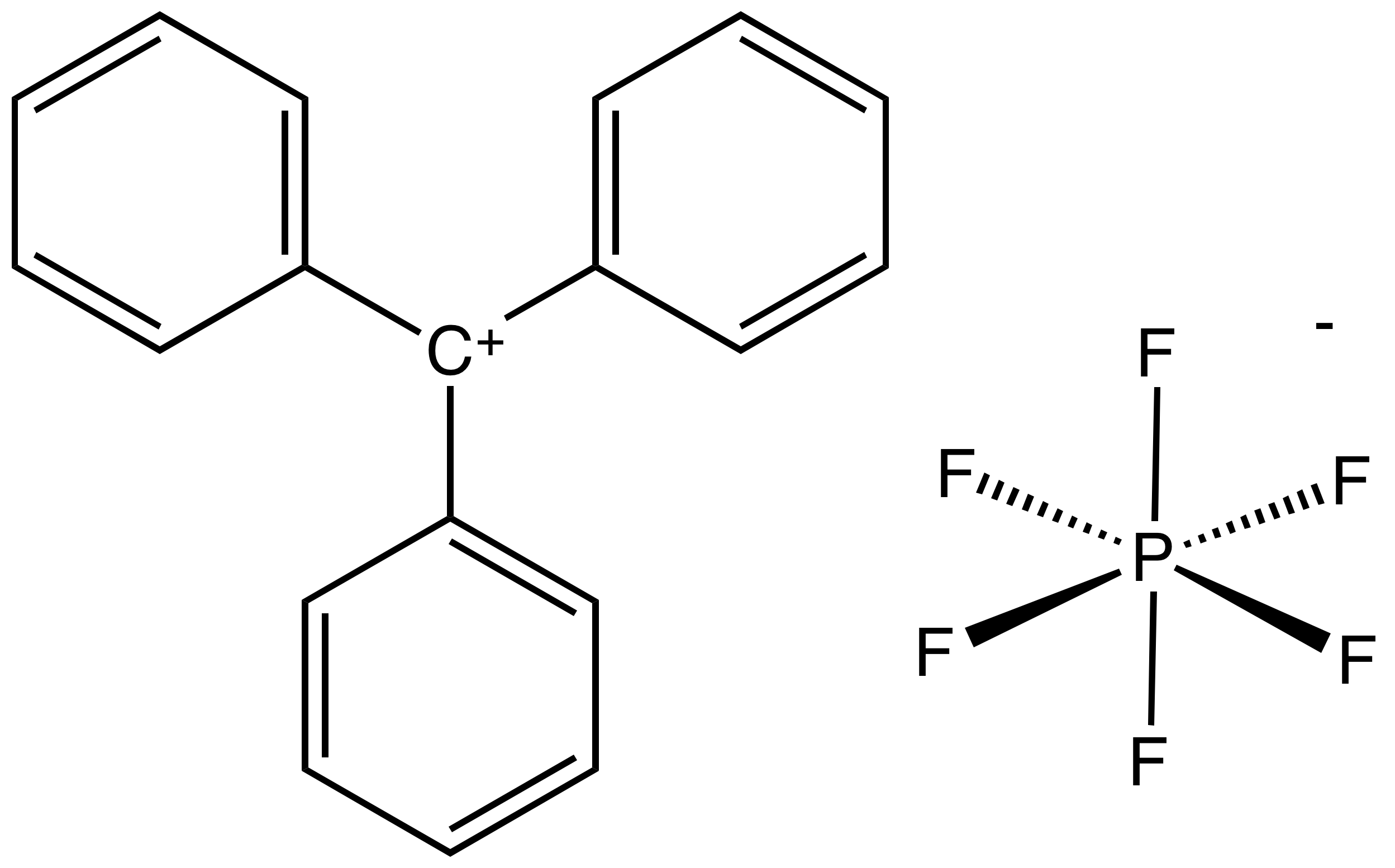

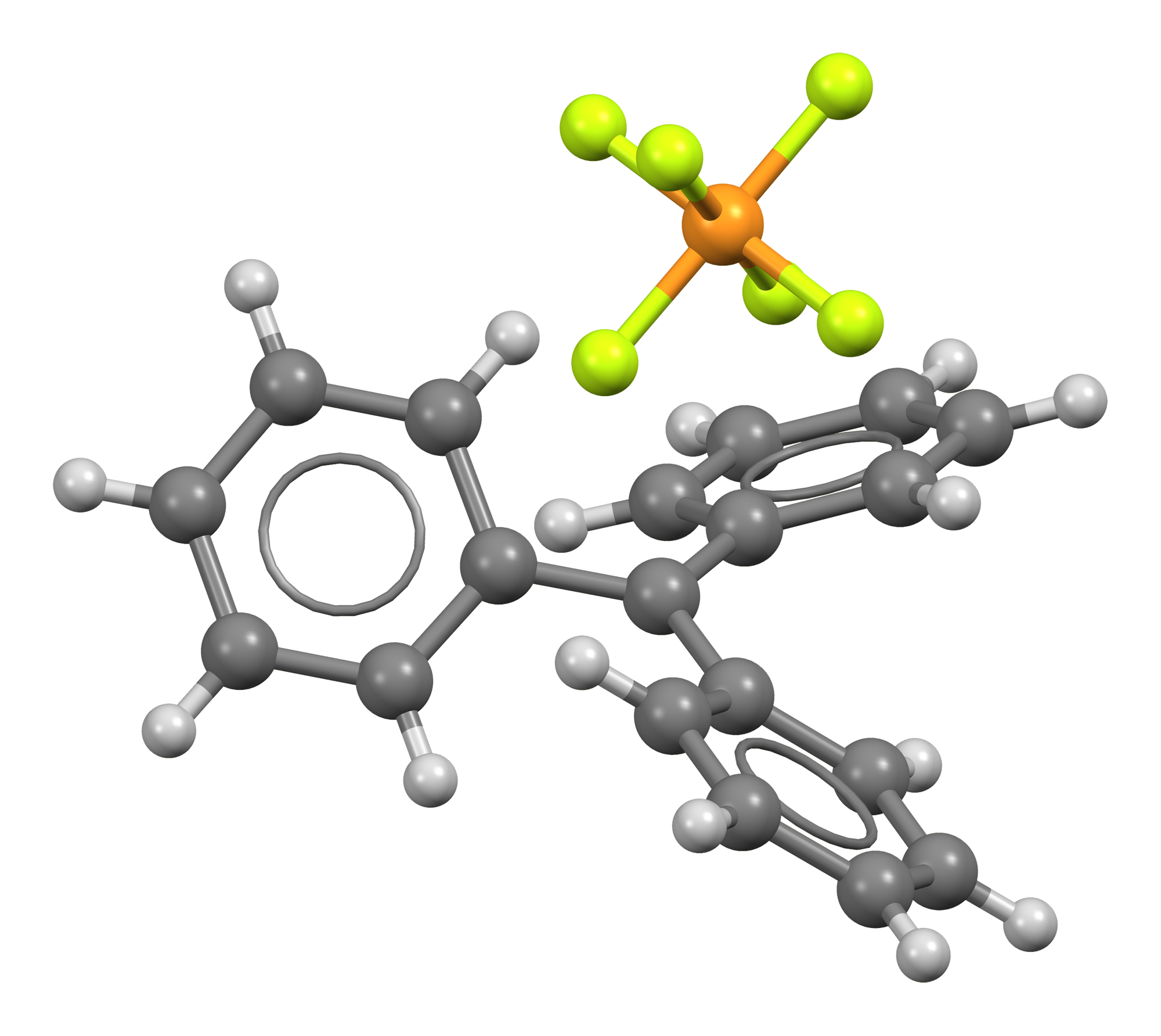

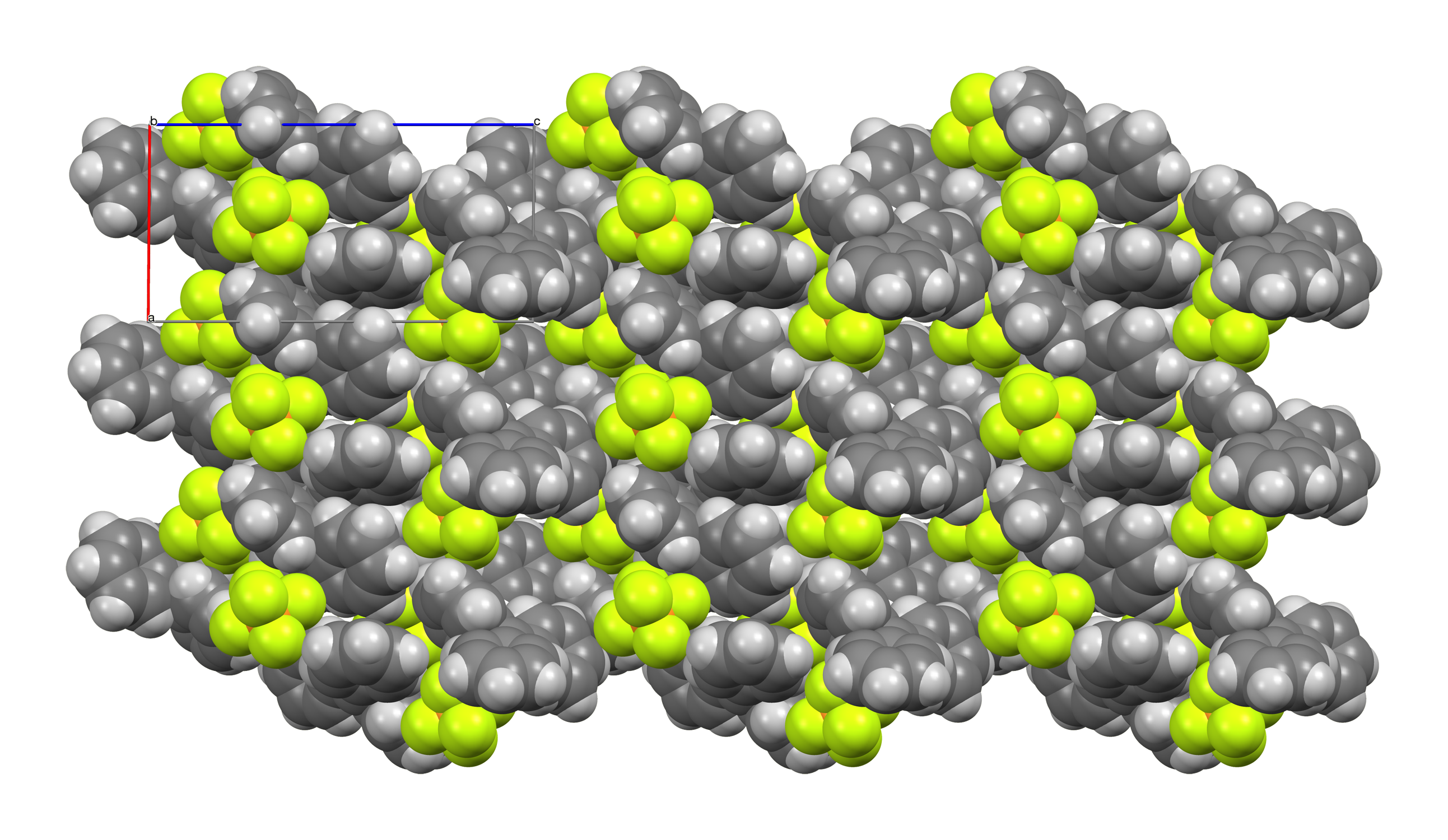

Names
- IUPAC name Triphenylcarbenium hexafluorophosphate
- Systematic IUPAC name Diphenylmethylbenzene hexafluoridophosphate
- Other names: Triphenylcarbenium hexafluorophosphate(V); Trityl hexafluorophosphate; Tritylium hexafluorophosphate

Identifiers
CAS Number	437-17-2
3D model (JSmol)	Interactive image
ChemSpider	2006130
ECHA InfoCard	100.006.467
EC Number	207-112-0
PubChem CID	2723954
CompTox Dashboard (EPA)	DTXSID40883238
- InChI: InChI=1S/C19H15.F6P/c1-4-10-16(11-5-1)19(17-12-6-2-7-13-17)18-14-8-3-9-15-18;1-7(2,3,4,5)6/h1-15H;/q+1;-1 Key: IBTFOFOFRZKIJU-UHFFFAOYSA-N
- SMILES: c1ccc(cc1)[C+](c1ccccc1)c1ccccc1.F[P-](F)(F)(F)(F)F

Properties
Chemical formula	[(C_{6}H_{5})_{3}C]^{+}[PF_{6}]^{−}
Molar mass	388.293 g·mol^{−1}
Appearance	Brown powder
Melting point	145 °C (293 °F; 418 K)

Hazards
- GHS labelling
Pictograms	(GHS05: Corrosive)
Signal word	Danger
Hazard statements	H314
Precautionary statements	P260, P264, P280, P301+P330+P331, P303+P361+P353, P304+P340, P305+P351+P338, P310, P321, P363, P405, P501
- Safety data sheet (SDS)
- Except where otherwise noted, data are given for materials in their standard state (at 25 °C [77 °F], 100 kPa). verify (what is ?) Infobox references

Triphenylmethyl hexafluorophosphate (also triphenylcarbenium hexafluorophosphate, trityl hexafluorophosphate, or tritylium hexafluorophosphate) is an organic salt with the formula [(C_{6}H_{5})_{3}C]^{+}[PF_{6}]^{−}, consisting of the triphenylcarbenium cation [(C_{6}H_{5})_{3}C]^{+} and the hexafluorophosphate anion [PF_{6}]^{−}.

Triphenylmethyl hexafluorophosphate is a brown powder that hydrolyzes readily to triphenylmethanol. It is used as a catalyst and reagent in organic syntheses.

== Preparation ==
Triphenylmethyl hexafluorophosphate can be prepared by combining silver hexafluorophosphate with triphenylmethyl chloride:

Ag^{+}[PF_{6}]^{−} + (C_{6}H_{5})_{3}CCl → [(C_{6}H_{5})_{3}C]^{+}[PF_{6}]^{−} + AgCl

A second method involves protonolysis of triphenylmethanol:

H[PF_{6}] + (C_{6}H_{5})_{3}COH → [(C_{6}H_{5})_{3}C]^{+}[PF_{6}]^{−} + H_{2}O

== Structure and reactions ==
Triphenylmethyl hexafluorophosphate readily hydrolyzes, in a reaction that is the reverse of one of its syntheses:

[(C_{6}H_{5})_{3}C]^{+}[PF_{6}]^{−} + H_{2}O → (C_{6}H_{5})_{3}COH + H[PF_{6}]

Triphenylmethyl hexafluorophosphate has been used for abstracting hydride (H^{−}) from organic compounds. Treatment of metal-alkene and diene complexes one can generate allyl and pentadienyl complexes, respectively.

Triphenylmethyl perchlorate is a common substitute for triphenylmethyl hexafluorophosphate. However, the perchlorate is not used as widely, because, like other organic perchlorates, it is potentially explosive.

== See also ==
- Triphenylmethyl radical
- Triphenylcarbenium
- Triphenylmethane
- Triphenylmethanol
- Triphenylmethyl chloride
