= Triphenylmethyl hydroperoxide =

Names
- Other names Trityl hydroperoxide

Identifiers
CAS Number	4198-93-0
3D model (JSmol)	Interactive image
ChemSpider	85943
EC Number	609-978-9
PubChem CID	95245
CompTox Dashboard (EPA)	DTXSID60194792
- InChI: InChI=1S/C19H16O2/c20-21-19(16-10-4-1-5-11-16,17-12-6-2-7-13-17)18-14-8-3-9-15-18/h1-15,20H Key: ILNQBWPWHQSSNX-UHFFFAOYSA-N
- SMILES: C1=CC=C(C=C1)C(C2=CC=CC=C2)(C3=CC=CC=C3)OO

Properties
Chemical formula	C_{19}H_{16}O_{2}
Molar mass	276.335 g·mol^{−1}
Density	1.27 g/ mL
Melting point	87.5–88.5 °C (189.5–191.3 °F; 360.6–361.6 K)

Hazards
- GHS labelling
Pictograms	(GHS03: Oxidizing) (GHS07: Exclamation mark)
Signal word	Danger
Hazard statements	H271, H315, H319, H335
Precautionary statements	P210, P220, P261, P264, P264+P265, P271, P280, P283, P302+P352, P304+P340, P305+P351+P338, P306+P360, P319, P321, P332+P317, P337+P317, P362+P364, P370+P378, P371+P380+P375, P403+P233, P405, P420, P501
- Except where otherwise noted, data are given for materials in their standard state (at 25 °C [77 °F], 100 kPa). Infobox references

Triphenylmethyl hydroperoxide is the organic compound with the formula (C_{6}H_{5})_{3}COOH. It is the hydroperoxide (OOH-containing) derivative of triphenylmethane. A colorless solid, it is an unusual example of a thermally robust hydroperoxide.

Triphenylmethyl hydroperoxide is prepared from by treating triphenylmethanol with hydrogen peroxide in the presence of acid:

(C_{6}H_{5})_{3}COH + H_{2}O_{2} → (C_{6}H_{5})_{3}COOH + H_{2}O
