= Tetraphenylmethane =

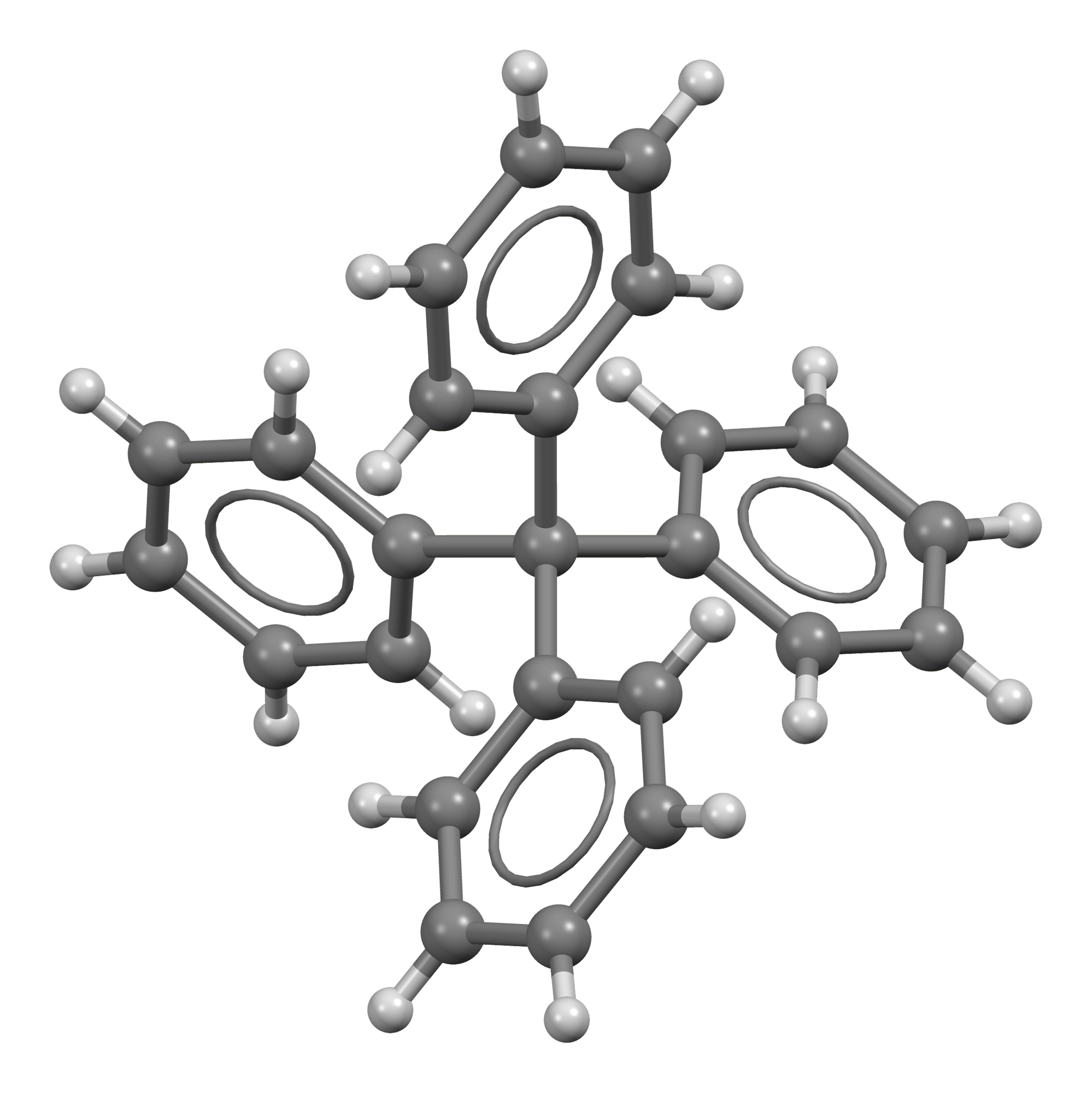

Names
- Preferred IUPAC name 1,1′,1′′,1′′′-Methanetetrayltetrabenzene

Identifiers
CAS Number	630-76-2
3D model (JSmol)	Interactive image
Abbreviations	Ph_{4}C
ChemSpider	11917
ECHA InfoCard	100.010.132
EC Number	211-144-0
PubChem CID	12424
UNII	CM2Q9C446P
CompTox Dashboard (EPA)	DTXSID30212215
- InChI: InChI=1S/C25H20/c1-5-13-21(14-6-1)25(22-15-7-2-8-16-22,23-17-9-3-10-18-23)24-19-11-4-12-20-24/h1-20H Key: PEQHIRFAKIASBK-UHFFFAOYSA-N; InChI=1/C25H20/c1-5-13-21(14-6-1)25(22-15-7-2-8-16-22,23-17-9-3-10-18-23)24-19-11-4-12-20-24/h1-20H Key: PEQHIRFAKIASBK-UHFFFAOYAS
- SMILES: c1ccccc1C(c2ccccc2)(c3ccccc3)c4ccccc4

Properties
Chemical formula	C_{25}H_{20}
Molar mass	320.435 g·mol^{−1}
Melting point	282 °C (540 °F; 555 K)
Boiling point	431 °C

Structure
Crystal structure	tetragonal
Space group	P4̅2_{1}c, No. 114
Point group	S_{4}
Lattice constant	a = 10.896 Å, c = 7.280 Å (20 °C)
Formula units (Z)	2

Hazards
- GHS labelling
Pictograms	(GHS08: Health hazard)
Signal word	Danger
Hazard statements	H350
Precautionary statements	P201, P202, P281, P308+P313, P405, P501
- Except where otherwise noted, data are given for materials in their standard state (at 25 °C [77 °F], 100 kPa). verify (what is ?) Infobox references

Tetraphenylmethane is an organic compound consisting of a methane core with four phenyl substituents. It was first synthesized by Moses Gomberg in 1898.

== Synthesis ==
Gomberg's classical organic synthesis shown below starts by reacting triphenylmethyl bromide 1 with phenylhydrazine 2 to the hydrazine 3. Oxidation with nitrous acid then produces the azo compound 4 from which on heating above the melting point, nitrogen gas evolves with formation of tetraphenylmethane 5.

Gomberg was able to distinguish this compound from triphenylmethane (elemental analysis was not an option given the small differences in the hydrogen fractions of 6.29% and 6.60%) by nitration of 5 with nitric acid to 6. A strong base would be able to abstract the methine proton of the nitrated triphenylmethyl compound if present, forming a strongly colored compound.

He obtained further evidence for the formation of tetraphenylmethane by reducing the nitro groups to amino groups with zinc dust in acetic acid to the leuco dye 7, which on exposure to hydrochloric acid eliminates aniline to the known compound pararosaniline 8.

Gomberg's success in synthesizing tetraphenylmethane set him on the attempt to prepare the next homologue hexaphenylethane, which led him to the discovery of the triphenylmethyl radical.

== See also ==
- Tetraphenylsilane
- Tetraphenyltin
- Tetraphenyllead
- Tetraphenylborate
- Triphenylmethane
- Toluene
