= Moses Gomberg =

American chemist (1866–1947)

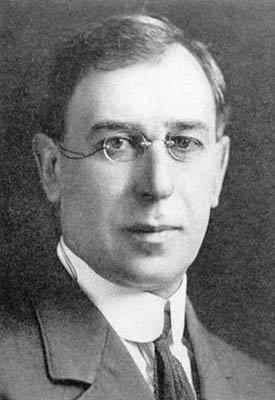
- Moses Gomberg, the father of radical chemistry
- Born: February 8, 1866; Yelizavetgrad, Russian Empire [now Kropyvnytskyi, Ukraine]
- Died: February 12, 1947 (aged 81); Ann Arbor, Michigan, United States
- Education: University of Michigan B.S., 1890, M.S., 1892, Ph.D., 1894
- Known for: Radical chemistry
- Awards: William H. Nichols Medal (1914); Willard Gibbs Award (1925); Chandler Medal (1927)
- Scientific career
- Fields: chemistry
- Workplaces: University of Michigan
- Doctoral advisor: A. B. Prescott

Moses Gomberg (February 8, 1866 – February 12, 1947) was a chemistry professor at the University of Michigan. He was elected to the National Academy of Sciences and the American Philosophical Society, and served as president of the American Chemical Society.

== Early life and education ==
He was born in Yelisavetgrad, Russian Empire to a Jewish merchant family. His father was Hershko (Hirsh) Gomberg and his mother was Maryam-Ethel Reznikova. In 1884, the family emigrated to Chicago to escape the pogroms following the assassination of Czar Alexander II. In Chicago he worked at the stockyards while attending Lake View High School (Chicago). In 1886, Moses entered the University of Michigan, where he obtained his B.Sc. in 1890 and his doctorate in 1894 under the supervision of A. B. Prescott. His thesis, titled "Trimethylxanthine and Some of its Derivatives", dealt with the derivatization of caffeine.

== Career ==
Gomberg in the chemistry lab

University of Michigan Chemistry Building

Appointed an instructor in 1893, Gomberg worked at the University of Michigan for the duration of his professional academic career, becoming chair of the department of chemistry from 1927 until his retirement in 1936. Dr. Gomberg served as president of the American Chemical Society in 1931.

In 1896–1897, he took a year's leave to work as a postdoctoral researcher with Baeyer and Thiele in Munich and with Victor Meyer in Heidelberg, where he successfully prepared the long-elusive tetraphenylmethane.

During attempts to prepare the even more sterically congested hydrocarbon hexaphenylethane, he correctly identified the triphenylmethyl radical, the first persistent radical to be discovered, and is thus known as the founder of radical chemistry. The work was later followed up by Wilhelm Schlenk. Gomberg was a mentor to Werner Emmanuel Bachmann who also carried on his work and together they discovered the Gomberg-Bachmann reaction. In 1923, he claimed to have synthesized chlorine tetroxide via the reaction of silver perchlorate with iodine, but was later shown to have been mistaken.

=== Synthesis of tetraphenylmethane ===
Gomberg was the first to successfully synthesize tetraphenylmethane. This was accomplished by the thermal decomposition of 1-phenyl-2-trityldiazene to the desired product in 2-5% yield.

=== Discovery of persistent radicals ===

Seeking to prepare hexaphenylethane (5), Gomberg attempted a Wurtz coupling of triphenylmethyl chloride (1). Elemental analysis of the resultant white crystalline solid, however, uncovered discrepancies with the predicted molecular formula:

	calculated for (5)	found
% Carbon	93.83	87.93
% Hydrogen	6.17	6.04

Hypothesizing that (1) had combined with molecular oxygen to form the peroxide (4), Gomberg found that treatment of (1) with sodium peroxide was another means of synthesizing (4).

By performing the reaction of triphenylchloromethane with zinc under an atmosphere of carbon dioxide Gomberg obtained the free radical (2). This compound reacted readily with air, chlorine, bromine and iodine. On the basis of his experimental evidence Gomberg concluded that he had discovered the first instance of a persistent radical and trivalent carbon. This was a controversial conclusion for many years as molecular weight determinations of (2) found a value that was double that of the free radical. Gomberg postulated that some non-tetravalent carbon structure existed in solution because of the observed activity towards oxygen and the halogens. Gomberg and Bachmann later found that treatment of "hexaphenylethane" with magnesium resulted in a Grignard reagent, the first instance of the formation of such a compound from a hydrocarbon. Studies of other triarylmethyl compounds gave results similar to Gomberg's, and it was hypothesized that (2) existed in equilibrium with its dimer hexaphenylethane (5). However this structure was later disproven in favor of the quinoid dimer (3).

At the end of his first report of trivalent carbon "On Trivalent Carbon" Gomberg wrote "This work will be continued and I wish to reserve the field for myself." While nineteenth-century chemists respected such claims Gomberg found that the field of chemistry he founded was too rich to reserve for himself.

== Legacy ==
Plaque commemorating the discovery of organic radicals

Upon his death in 1947 Moses Gomberg bequeathed his estate to the chemistry department of the University of Michigan for the creation of student fellowships. In 2000, the centennial of his paper "Triphenylmethyl, a Case of Trivalent Carbon", a symposium was held in his memory and a plaque was installed in the Chemistry Building at the University of Michigan designating a National Historic Chemical Landmark.

In 1993, the chemistry department of the University of Michigan instituted the Moses Gomberg Lecture series to provide assistant professors an opportunity to invite distinguished scientists to the chemistry department.

== Personal life ==
Gomberg never married, living with his sister Sophia in Ann Arbor for his adult life.
