= Benzenoid =

Class of organic compounds

In organic chemistry, benzenoids are a class of organic compounds with at least one benzene ring. These compounds have increased stability due to resonance in the benzene rings. Most aromatic hydrocarbons are benzenoid. Notable counterexamples are cyclooctadecanonaene, azulene and trans-bicalicene.

Plants use them.

== See also ==
- Quinoid
- Aromatic compound
