= Triphenylmethanol =

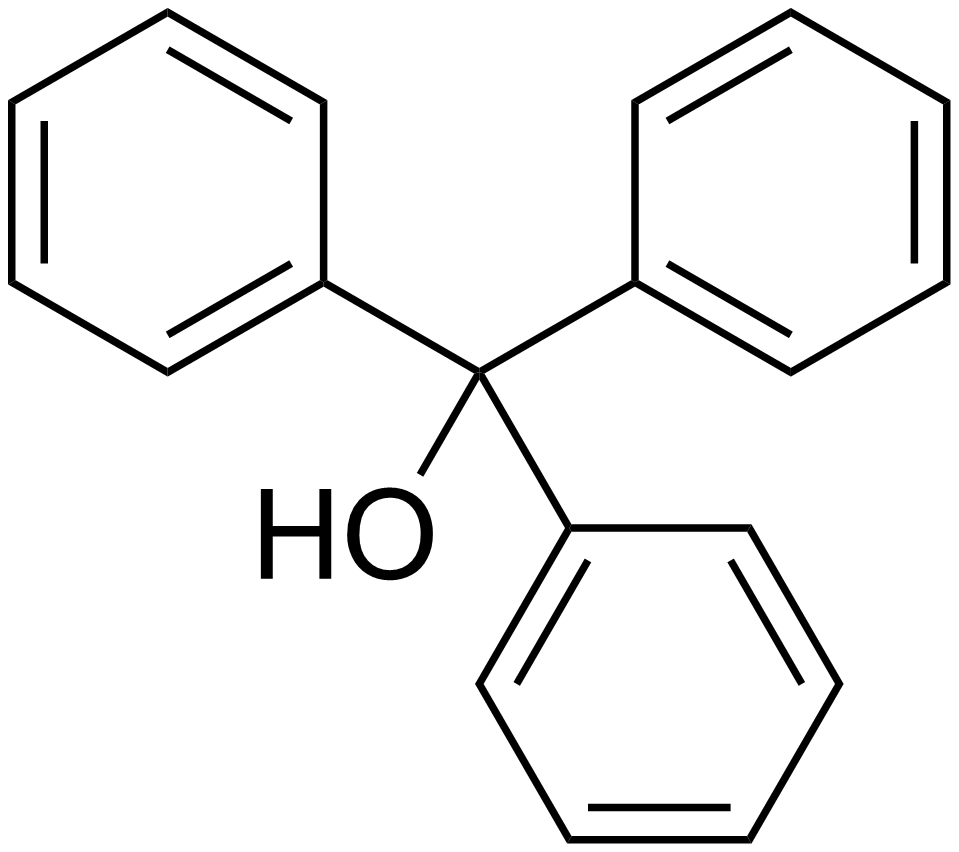

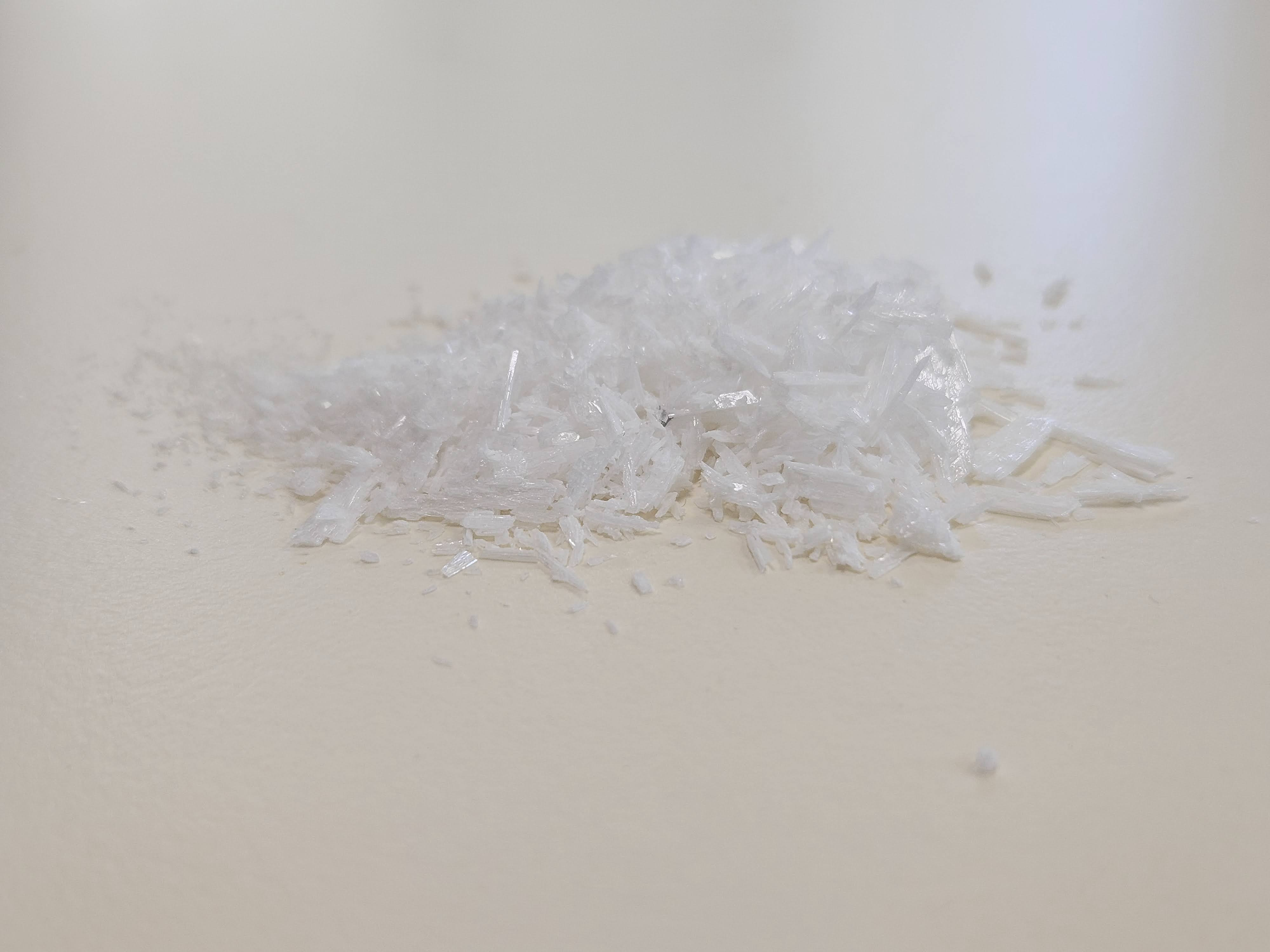

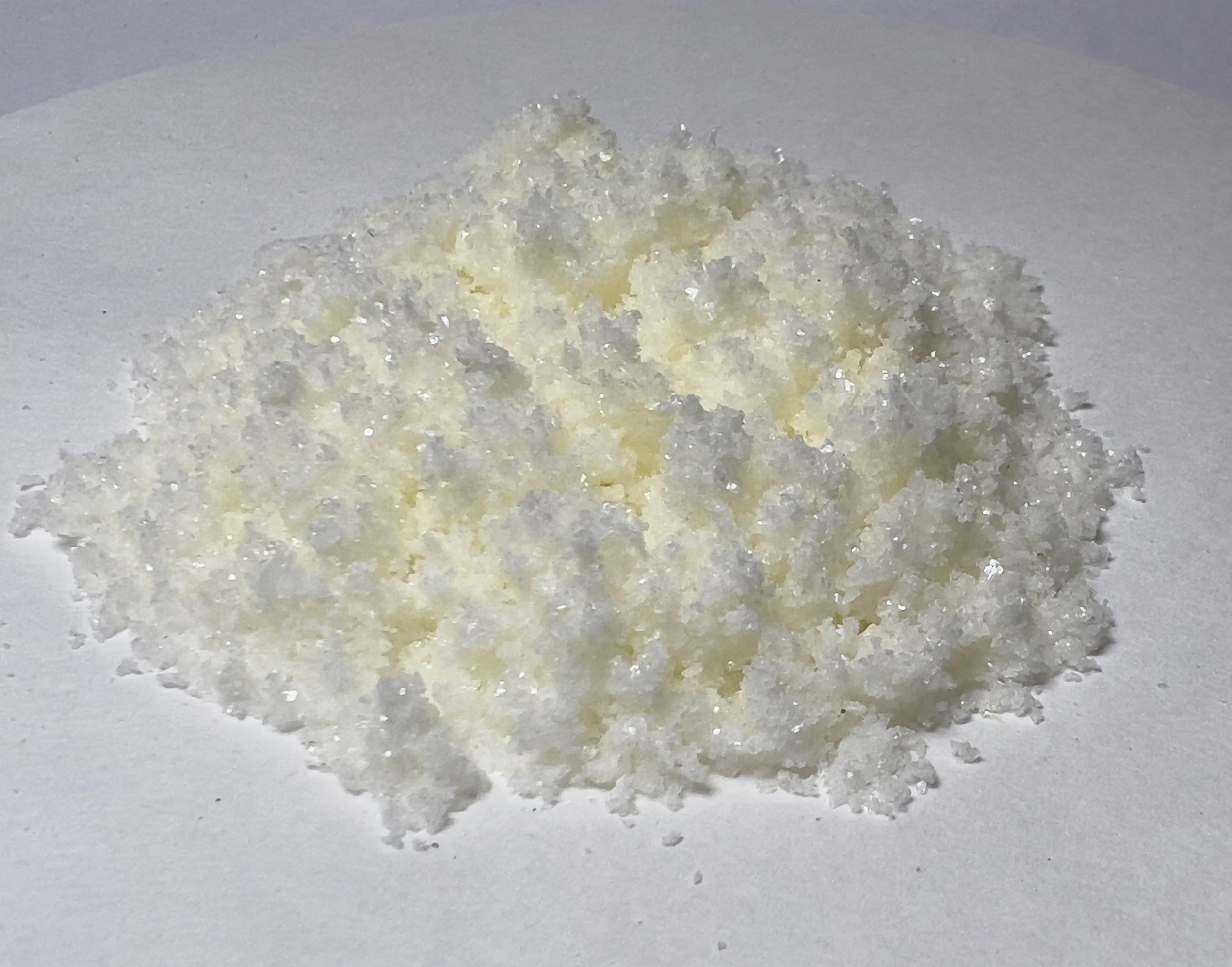

Names
- Preferred IUPAC name Triphenylmethanol
- Other names Triphenylcarbinol trityl alcohol Tritanol

Identifiers
CAS Number	76-84-6
3D model (JSmol)	Interactive image
Abbreviations	Ph_{3}COH; TrOH
ChEMBL	ChEMBL118166
ChemSpider	6215
ECHA InfoCard	100.000.899
PubChem CID	6457
UNII	U97Q0OU9KB
CompTox Dashboard (EPA)	DTXSID0058803
- InChI: InChI=1S/C19H16O/c20-19(16-10-4-1-5-11-16,17-12-6-2-7-13-17)18-14-8-3-9-15-18/h1-15,20H Key: LZTRCELOJRDYMQ-UHFFFAOYSA-N; InChI=1/C19H16O/c20-19(16-10-4-1-5-11-16,17-12-6-2-7-13-17)18-14-8-3-9-15-18/h1-15,20H Key: LZTRCELOJRDYMQ-UHFFFAOYAJ
- SMILES: OC(c1ccccc1)(c2ccccc2)c3ccccc3

Properties
Chemical formula	C_{19}H_{16}O
Molar mass	260.336 g·mol^{−1}
Appearance	White crystalline solid
Density	1.199
Melting point	160 to 163 °C (320 to 325 °F; 433 to 436 K)
Boiling point	360 to 380 °C (680 to 716 °F; 633 to 653 K)
Magnetic susceptibility (χ)	−175.7·10^{−6} cm^{3}/mol

Hazards
Safety data sheet (SDS)	External MSDS

Related compounds
Related compounds	Triphenylmethane, Tricyclohexylmethanol
- Except where otherwise noted, data are given for materials in their standard state (at 25 °C [77 °F], 100 kPa). verify (what is ?) Infobox references

Triphenylmethanol (also known as trityl alcohol and TrOH) is an organic compound. It is a white crystalline solid that is insoluble in water and petroleum ether, but well soluble in ethanol, diethyl ether, and benzene. In strongly acidic solutions, it produces an intensely yellow color, due to the formation of a stable "trityl" carbocation. Many derivatives of triphenylmethanol are important dyes.

== Structure and properties ==
Triphenylmethanol features three phenyl (Ph) rings and an alcohol group bound to a central tetrahedral carbon atom. All three C–Ph bonds are typical of sp^{3}-sp^{2} carbon-carbon bonds with lengths of approximately 1.47 Å, while the C–O bond length is approximately 1.42 Å.

The presence of three adjacent phenyl groups confers special properties manifested in the reactivity of the alcohol. For example it reacts with acetyl chloride, not to give the ester, but triphenylmethyl chloride:

Ph_{3}COH + MeCOCl → Ph_{3}CCl + MeCO_{2}H

The three phenyl groups also offer steric protection. Reaction with hydrogen peroxide gives an unusually stable hydroperoxide, Ph_{3}COOH.

=== Acid-base properties ===
As a derivative of methanol, triphenylmethanol is expected to have a pK_{a} in the range of 16–19. Typical of alcohols, resonance offers no stabilization of the conjugate base due to being bonded to a sp^{3} carbon atom. Stabilization of the anion by solvation forces is largely ineffective due to the steric influence of the three phenyl groups.

The basicity of triphenylmethanol is enhanced due to the formation of a resonance-stabilized carbocation upon breaking of the C–O bond. After protonation of the oxygen under strongly acidic conditions, triphenylmethanol loses water to form the triphenylmethyl ("trityl") cation:

Ph_{3}COH + H^{+} → Ph_{3}C^{+} + H_{2}O

The trityl cation is one of the easiest carbocations to isolate, although it quickly reacts with water.

Triphenylmethyl hydroperoxide is prepared from by treating triphenylmethanol with hydrogen peroxide in the presence of acid:

(C_{6}H_{5})_{3}COH + H_{2}O_{2} → (C_{6}H_{5})_{3}COOH + H_{2}O

== Synthesis ==
The Russian doctoral student Walerius Hemilian (1851–1914) first synthesized triphenylmethanol in 1874 by hydrolysis of triphenylmethyl bromide as well as by chromate oxidation of triphenylmethane.

The preparation of triphenylmethanol from methyl benzoate or benzophenone and phenylmagnesium bromide is a common laboratory experiment for illustrating the Grignard reaction. An alternative starting material is diethyl carbonate.

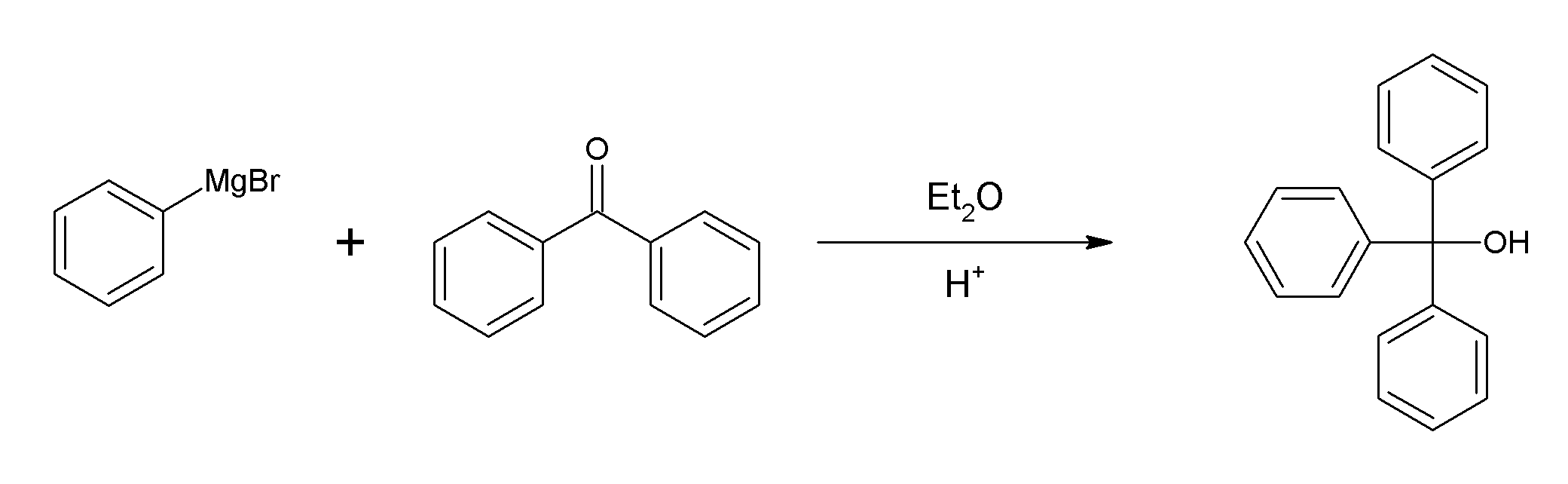

== Applications ==
Although not of major industrial importance, triphenylmethanol is a useful reagent in the research laboratory. Substituted derivatives of triphenylmethanol are intermediates in the production of the commercially useful triarylmethane dyes.
