= Triphenylmethyl chloride =

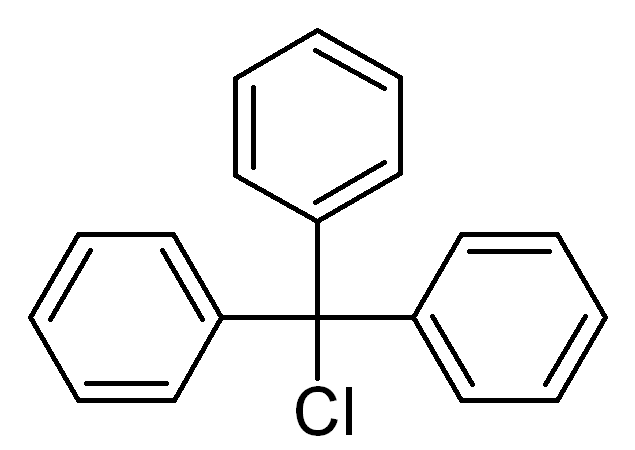

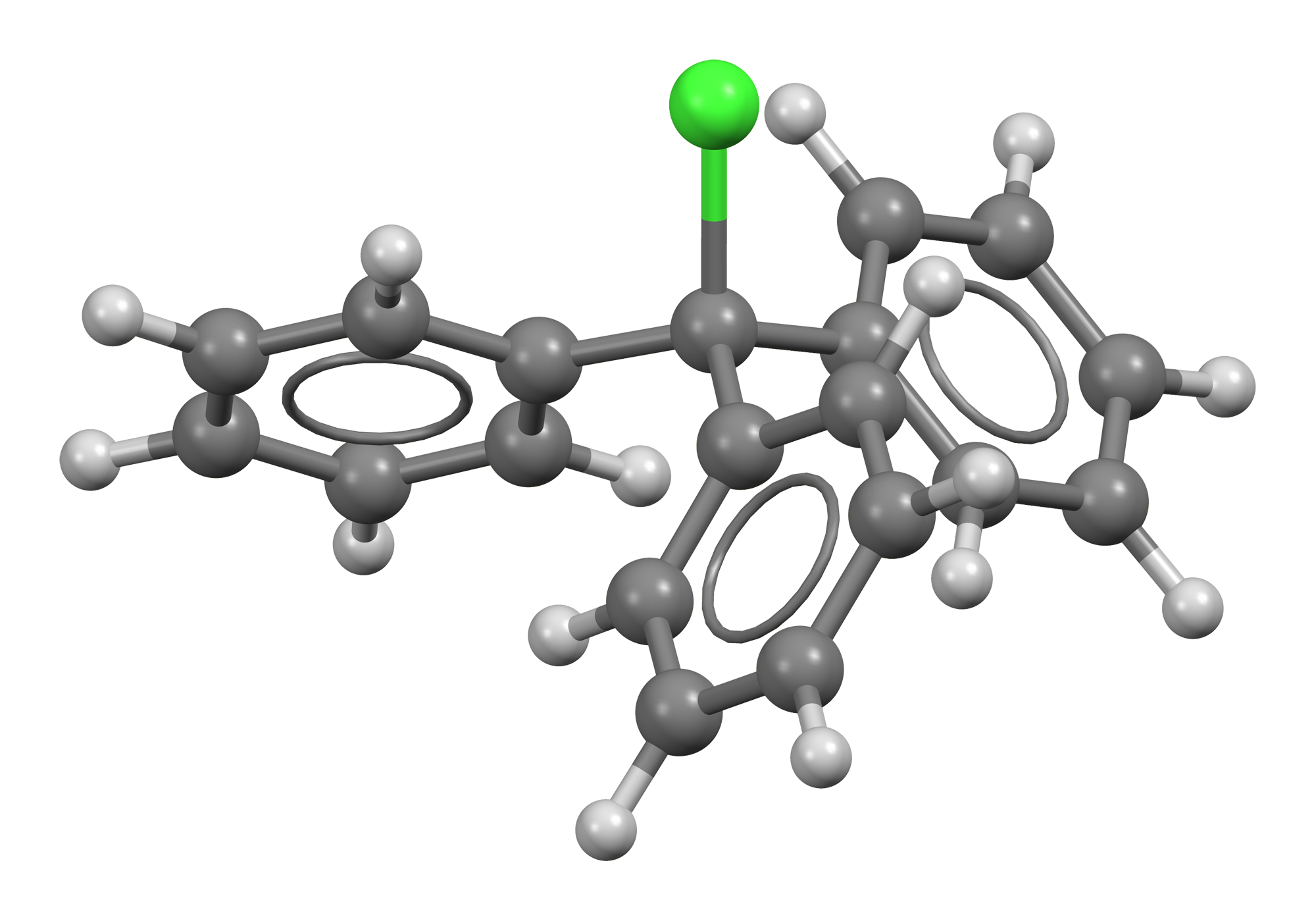

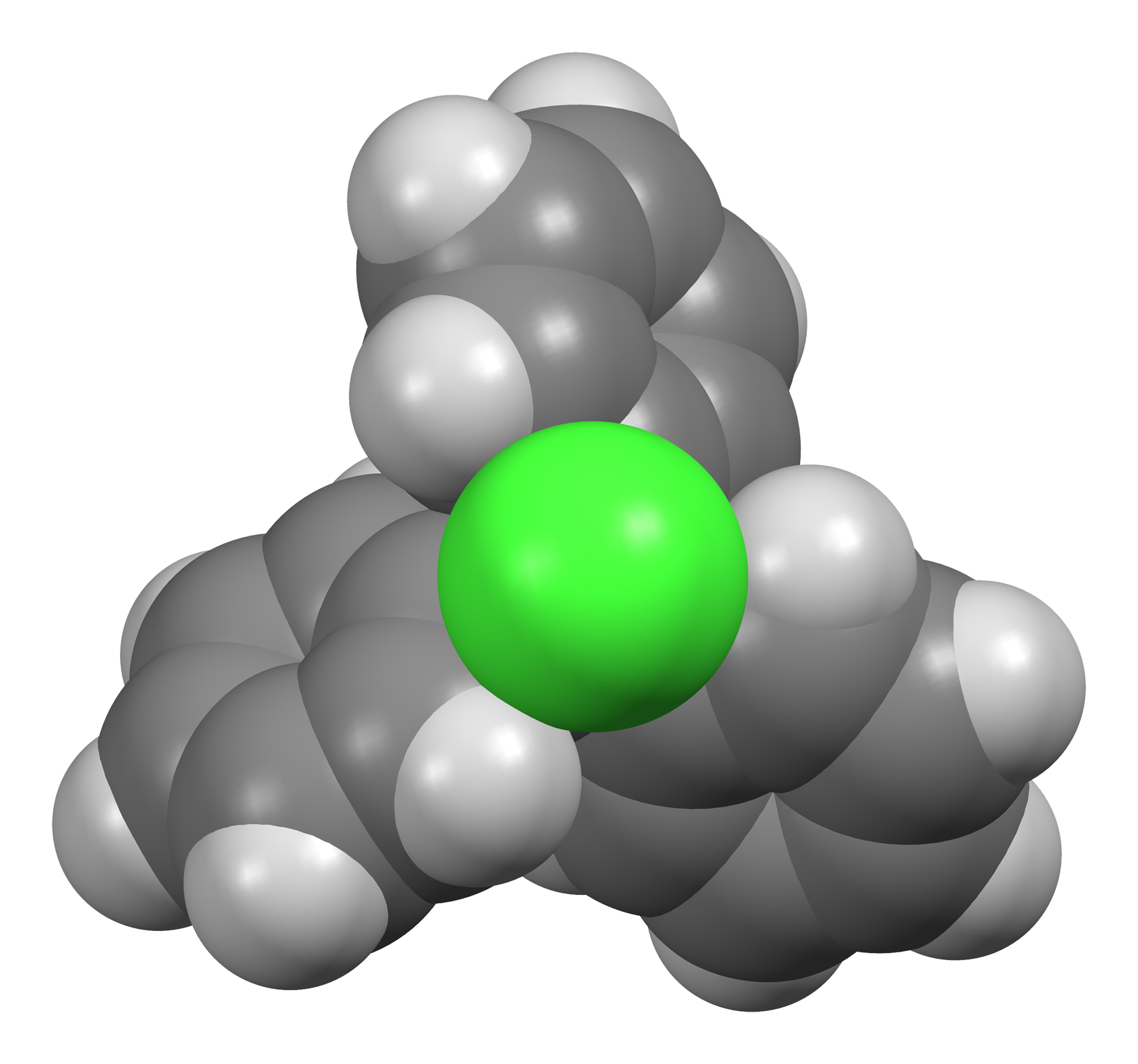

Names
- Preferred IUPAC name 1,1′,1′′-(Chloromethanetriyl)tribenzene
- Other names (Chloromethanetriyl)tribenzene [Chloro(diphenyl)methyl]benzene; Triphenylchloromethane

Identifiers
CAS Number	76-83-5
3D model (JSmol)	Interactive image
Abbreviations	Ph_{3}CCl; TrCl
ChemSpider	17344583
ECHA InfoCard	100.000.898
PubChem CID	6456
UNII	1D9GZ8QQXN
CompTox Dashboard (EPA)	DTXSID3052511
- InChI: InChI=1S/C19H15Cl.C10H10.C8H8/c20-19(16-10-4-1-5-11-16,17-12-6-2-7-13-17)18-14-8-3-9-15-18;1-3-9-5-7-10(4-2)8-6-9;1-2-8-6-4-3-5-7-8/h1-15H;3-8H,1-2H2;2-7H,1H2 Key: TXMWQDFQVWGFTQ-UHFFFAOYSA-N
- SMILES: C1=CC=C(C=C1)C(C2=CC=CC=C2)(C3=CC=CC=C3)Cl

Properties
Chemical formula	C_{19}H_{15}Cl
Molar mass	278.78 g·mol^{−1}
Appearance	white solid
Density	1.141 g/cm^{3}
Melting point	109 to 112 °C (228 to 234 °F; 382 to 385 K)
Boiling point	230 °C (446 °F; 503 K) (at 20 mmHg) and 374.3 °C (at 760 mmHg)
Solubility	soluble in chloroform, benzene, acetone, ether, THF, hexane

Hazards
Flash point	177.9 °C (352.2 °F; 451.0 K)
Safety data sheet (SDS)	Corvine Chemicals MSDS
- Except where otherwise noted, data are given for materials in their standard state (at 25 °C [77 °F], 100 kPa). verify (what is ?) Infobox references

Triphenylmethyl chloride or trityl chloride (TrCl) is an organic compound with the chemical formula (C_{6}H_{5})_{3}CCl. It is a white solid although impure samples can appear yellowish. It is sometimes used to introduce the trityl protecting group.

== Preparation ==
Triphenylmethyl chloride is commercially available. It may be prepared by the reaction of triphenylmethanol with acetyl chloride, or by the Friedel–Crafts alkylation of benzene with carbon tetrachloride to give the trityl chloride-aluminium chloride adduct, which is then hydrolyzed.

== Reactions ==
Triphenylmethylsodium can be prepared from trityl chloride and sodium:

(C_{6}H_{5})_{3}CCl + 2 Na → (C_{6}H_{5})_{3}CNa + NaCl

Reaction with silver hexafluorophosphate gives triphenylmethyl hexafluorophosphate.

Trityl chloride reacts with zinc in nonpolar solvents (e.g. benzene) to form Gomberg's dimer.

2 (C_{6}H_{5})_{3}CCl + Zn → [(C_{6}H_{5})_{3}C]_{2} + ZnCl_{2}

== See also ==
- Triphenylmethyl radical
- Triphenylmethane
- Triphenylmethyl hexafluorophosphate
- Triphenylmethanol
- Gomberg's dimer
