= Quinoid =

Organic compounds derived from quinone

This is the general formula for non-benzenoid quinones, in which either m or n can be 0 but not both, and they are both positive integers

In organic chemistry, quinoids are a class of chemical compounds that are derived from quinone. Unlike benzenoid structures, the quinoid part is not aromatic.

== See also ==
- Benzenoid
- Aromatic compound
