= Gomberg's dimer =

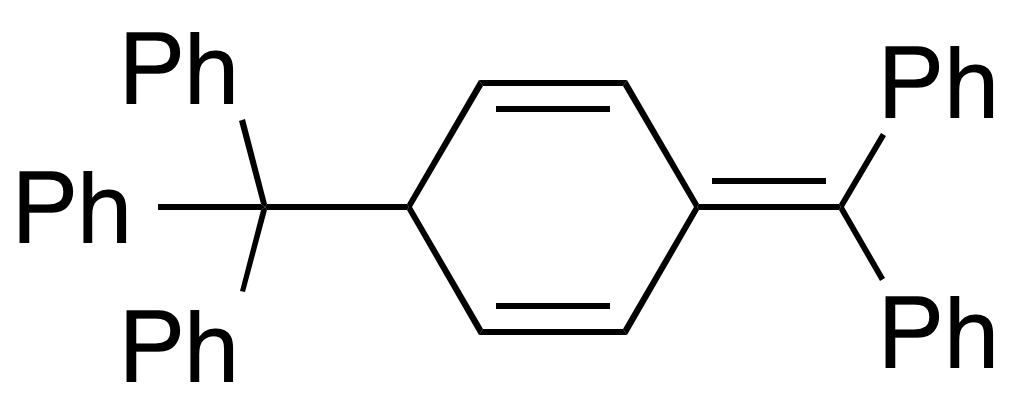

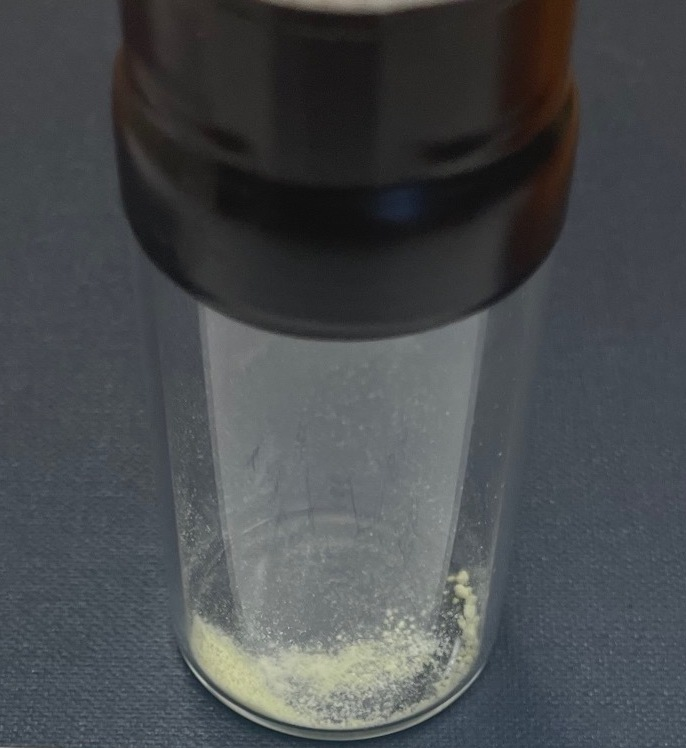

Names
- Preferred IUPAC name 1,1′,1′′-{[4-(Diphenylmethylidene)cyclohexa-2,5-dien-1-yl]methanetriyl}tribenzene
- Other names 3-triphenylmethyl-6-diphenylmethylidene-1,4-cyclohexadiene

Identifiers
CAS Number	18909-18-7
3D model (JSmol)	Interactive image
ChemSpider	123721
PubChem CID	140290
CompTox Dashboard (EPA)	DTXSID10894912
- InChI: InChI=1S/C38H30/c1-6-16-30(17-7-1)37(31-18-8-2-9-19-31)32-26-28-36(29-27-32)38(33-20-10-3-11-21-33,34-22-12-4-13-23-34)35-24-14-5-15-25-35/h1-29,36H Key: FWSYACUVHKGULL-UHFFFAOYSA-N
- SMILES: C1=CC=C(C=C1)C(=C2C=CC(C=C2)C(C3=CC=CC=C3)(C4=CC=CC=C4)C5=CC=CC=C5)C6=CC=CC=C6

Properties
Chemical formula	C_{38}H_{30}
Molar mass	486.658 g·mol^{−1}
Appearance	Yellow solid
Density	1.16 g/cm^{3}
Melting point	140–144 °C; 284–291 °F; 413–417 K
- Except where otherwise noted, data are given for materials in their standard state (at 25 °C [77 °F], 100 kPa). Infobox references

Gomberg's dimer is the organic compound with the formula Ph_{2}C=C_{6}H_{5}-CPh_{3}, where Ph = C_{6}H_{5}. It is a yellow solid that is air-stable for hours at room temperature and soluble in organic solvents. The compound achieved fame as the dimer of triphenylmethyl radical, which was prepared by Moses Gomberg in his quest for hexaphenylethane.

Its quinoid structure has been determined by X-ray crystallography. The C-C bond that reversibly breaks is rather long at 159.7 picometers.

== Synthesis and reactions ==
Gomberg's dimer can be prepared quantitatively by treating trityl bromide with powdered copper or silver:

2 Ph_{3}CBr + 2 Cu → Ph_{2}C=C_{6}H_{5}-CPh_{3} + 2 CuBr

Gomberg's dimer reversibly dissociates to the triphenylmethyl radical in organic solvents:

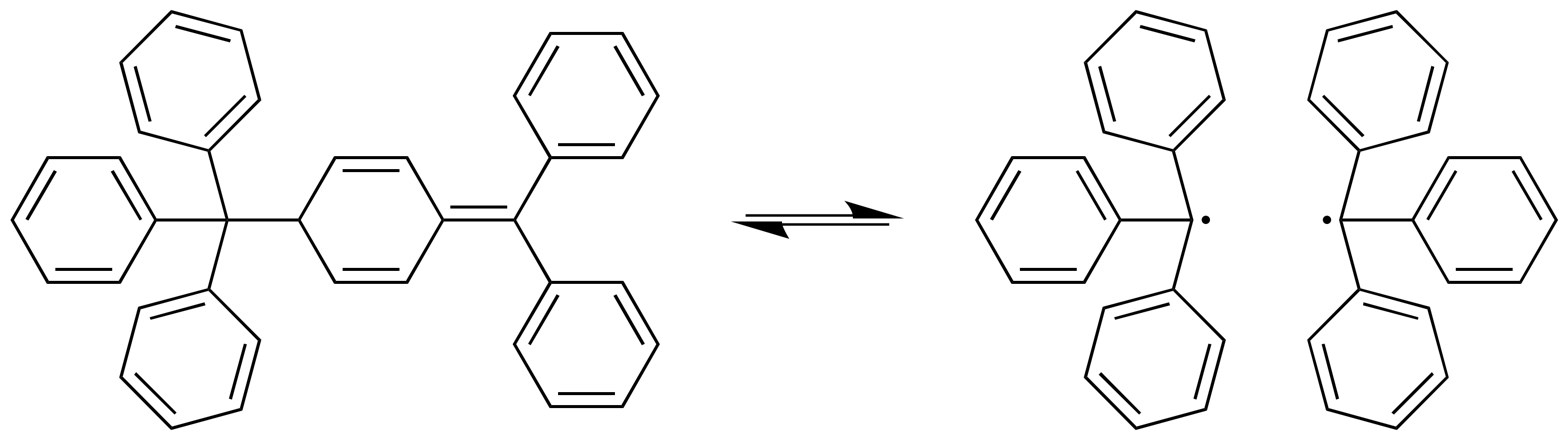

== See also ==
- Hexaphenylethane
