= Hexaphenylethane =

Names
- Preferred IUPAC name 1,1′,1′′,1′′′,1′′′ ′,1′′′ ′′,1′′′ ′′′-Ethanehexaylhexabenzene
- Other names 1,1,1,2,2,2-Hexaphenylethane

Identifiers
CAS Number	17854-07-8
3D model (JSmol)	Interactive image
ChemSpider	453126
PubChem CID	519482
CompTox Dashboard (EPA)	DTXSID201335989 DTXSID10894912, DTXSID201335989
- InChI: InChI=1S/C38H30/c1-7-19-31(20-8-1)37(32-21-9-2-10-22-32,33-23-11-3-12-24-33)38(34-25-13-4-14-26-34,35-27-15-5-16-28-35)36-29-17-6-18-30-36/h1-30H Key: IPOBVSHPVYWJQC-UHFFFAOYSA-N
- SMILES: c1ccc(cc1)C(c2ccccc2)(c3ccccc3)C(c4ccccc4)(c5ccccc5)c6ccccc6

Properties
Chemical formula	C_{38}H_{30}
Molar mass	486.658 g·mol^{−1}
- Except where otherwise noted, data are given for materials in their standard state (at 25 °C [77 °F], 100 kPa). Infobox references

Hexaphenylethane is a hypothetical organic compound consisting of an ethane core with six phenyl substituents. As of 2022, all attempts at its synthesis have been unsuccessful. The trityl free radical, Ph_{3}C · , was originally thought to dimerize to form hexaphenylethane. However, an inspection of the NMR spectrum of this dimer reveals that it is in fact a non-symmetrical species, Gomberg's dimer instead.

A substituted derivative of hexaphenylethane, hexakis(3,5-di-t-butylphenyl)ethane, has however been prepared. It features a very long central C–C bond at 167 pm (compared to the typical bond length of 154 pm). Attractive London dispersion forces between the t-butyl substituents are believed to be responsible for the stability of this very hindered molecule.

== See also ==
- Tetraphenylmethane

== Literature ==
- Uchimura, Yasuto; Takeda, Takashi; Katoono, Ryo; Fujiwara, Kenshu; Suzuki, Takanori (2015). "Inside Back Cover: New Insights into the Hexaphenylethane Riddle: Formation of an α,o-Dimer". Angewandte Chemie International Edition. 54 (13): 4125. doi:10.1002/anie.201501649.
