= Triphenylmethane =

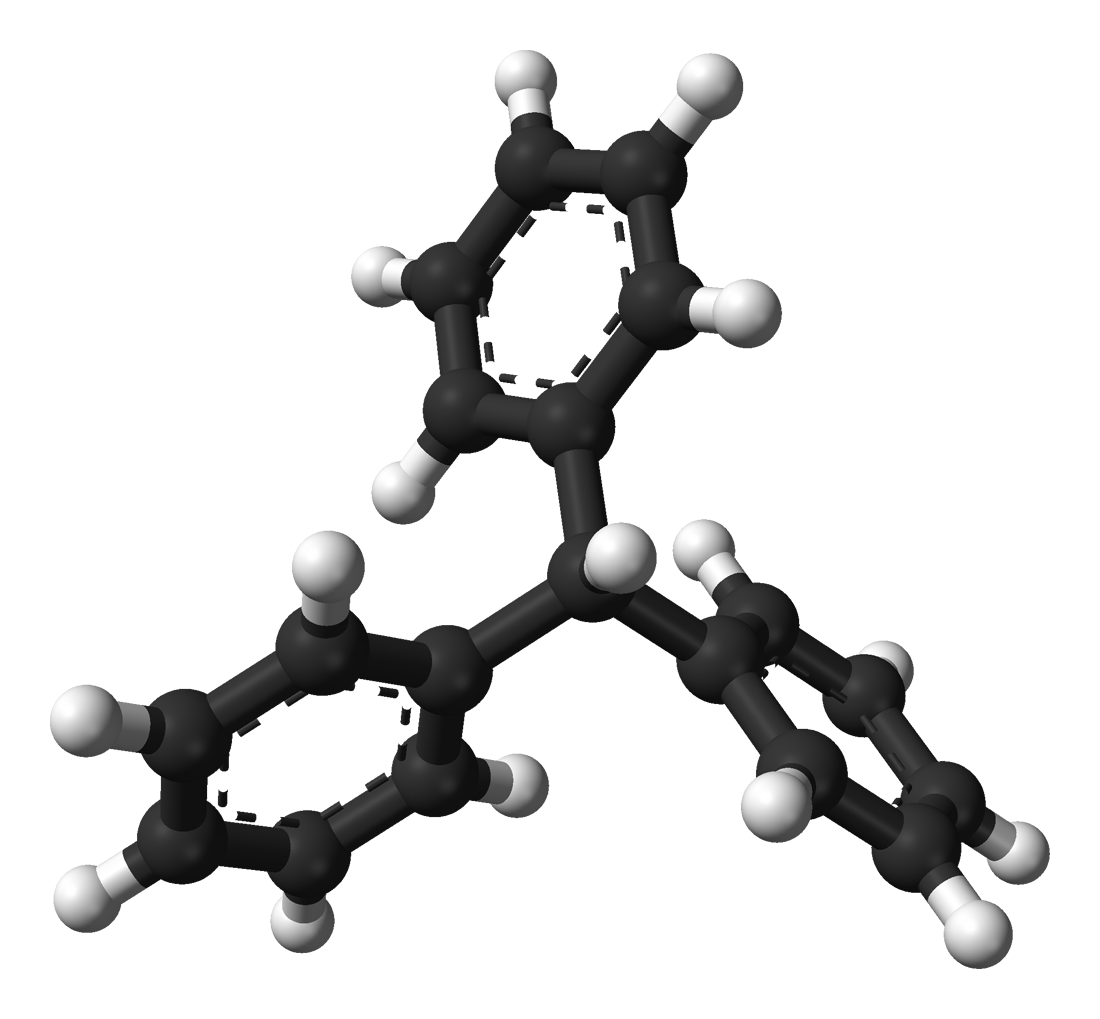

Names
- Preferred IUPAC name 1,1′,1″-Methanetriyltribenzene
- Other names Triphenylmethane; 1,1′,1″-Methylidynetrisbenzene

Identifiers
CAS Number	519-73-3
3D model (JSmol)	Interactive image
Abbreviations	Ph_{3}CH; TrH
ChEBI	CHEBI:76212
ChemSpider	10169
ECHA InfoCard	100.007.524
EC Number	208-275-0
PubChem CID	10614
UNII	8O4UTW9E17
CompTox Dashboard (EPA)	DTXSID3060164
- InChI: InChI=1S/C19H16/c1-4-10-16(11-5-1)19(17-12-6-2-7-13-17)18-14-8-3-9-15-18/h1-15,19H Key: AAAQKTZKLRYKHR-UHFFFAOYSA-N; InChI=1/C19H16/c1-4-10-16(11-5-1)19(17-12-6-2-7-13-17)18-14-8-3-9-15-18/h1-15,19H Key: AAAQKTZKLRYKHR-UHFFFAOYAF
- SMILES: c1c(cccc1)C(c2ccccc2)c3ccccc3

Properties
Chemical formula	C_{19}H_{16}
Molar mass	244.337 g·mol^{−1}
Appearance	Colorless solid
Density	1.014 g/cm^{3}
Melting point	92 to 94 °C (198 to 201 °F; 365 to 367 K)
Boiling point	359 °C (678 °F; 632 K)
Solubility in water	Insoluble
Solubility	Soluble in dioxane and hexane
Acidity (pK_{a})	33
Magnetic susceptibility (χ)	−165.6×10^{−6} cm^{3}/mol

Hazards
- GHS labelling
Pictograms	(GHS07: Exclamation mark)
Signal word	Warning
Hazard statements	H315, H319, H335
Safety data sheet (SDS)	External MSDS
- Except where otherwise noted, data are given for materials in their standard state (at 25 °C [77 °F], 100 kPa). verify (what is ?) Infobox references

Triphenylmethane or triphenyl methane (sometimes also known as Tritan), is the hydrocarbon with the formula (C_{6}H_{5})_{3}CH. This colorless solid is soluble in nonpolar organic solvents and not in water. Triphenylmethane is the basic skeleton of many synthetic dyes called triarylmethane dyes, many of them are pH indicators, and some display fluorescence. A trityl group in organic chemistry is a triphenylmethyl group Ph_{3}C, e.g. triphenylmethyl chloride (trityl chloride) and the triphenylmethyl radical (trityl radical).

== Preparation ==
Triphenylmethane was first synthesized by heating diphenylmercury (Hg(C_{6}H_{5})_{2}, Quecksilberdiphenyl) with benzal chloride (C_{6}H_{5}CHCl_{2}, Benzylenchlorid).

It can be synthesized by Friedel–Crafts reaction from benzene and chloroform in the presence of aluminium chloride catalyst:

3 C_{6}H_{6} + CHCl_{3} → Ph_{3}CH + 3 HCl

Alternatively, benzene may react with carbon tetrachloride using the same catalyst to obtain the triphenylmethyl chloride–aluminium chloride adduct which is then treated with diethyl ether for 24 hours at room temperature and hydrolyzed with concentrated hydrochloric acid:

3 C_{6}H_{6} + CCl_{4} + AlCl_{3} → Ph_{3}CCl·AlCl_{3}
Ph_{3}CCl·AlCl_{3} + Et_{2}O + HCl → Ph_{3}CH

It can also be synthesized from benzal chloride, which is prepared from benzaldehyde and phosphorus pentachloride.

== Reactions of C-H bond ==
The Ph_{3}C-H bond is relatively weak, with a bond dissociation energy (BDE) of 81 kcal/mol, or about 24 kcal/mol less than methane. Correspondingly, triphenylmethane is relatively acidic, with a pK_{a} of 33.

Triphenylmethane is significantly more acidic than most other hydrocarbons because the charge is delocalized over three phenyl rings. Steric effects however prevent all three phenyl rings from achieving coplanarity simultaneously. Consequently diphenylmethane is even more acidic, albeit only slightly, because in its anion the charge is spread over two phenyl rings at the same time.

The trityl anion is isolable in crown ethers:

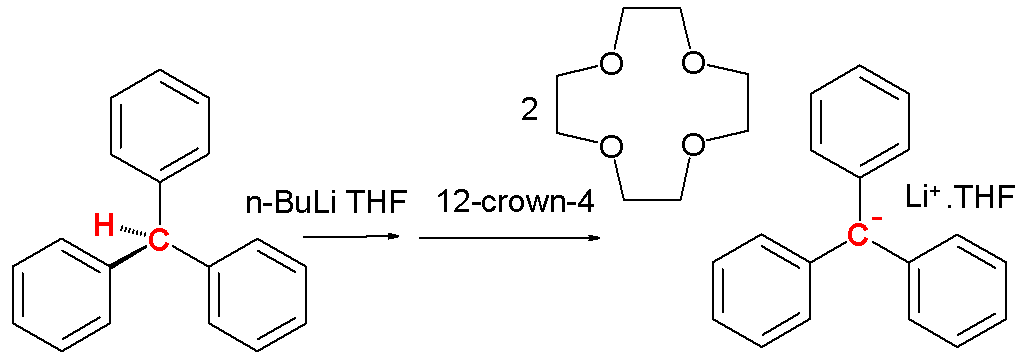

Its sodium salt can be prepared from the chloride:

(C_{6}H_{5})_{3}CCl + 2 Na → (C_{6}H_{5})_{3}CNa + NaCl

The use of tritylsodium as a strong, non-nucleophilic base has been eclipsed by the popularization of butyllithium and related strong bases.

The unmodified anion is red, and can be used as an indicator in acid–base titrations. Derived substances have proven useful as chemical dyes.

== Triarylmethane dyes ==
Examples of triarylmethane dyes are bromocresol green:

And the nitrogen-bearing malachite green:

== Trityl group ==
=== Protecting group ===
The triphenylmethyl substituent, also called trityl after a 1927 suggestion by Helferich et al., is widely used in organic chemistry. Trityl serves as a protecting group for alcohols.

protection (requires proton acceptor): Ph_{3}CCl + ROH → Ph_{3}COR + HCl
deprotection: Ph_{3}COR + HBr → ROH + Ph_{3}CBr

=== Platform for unusual functional groups ===
Trityl derivatives of reactive functional groups are often crystalline and in some cases sterically stabilized relative to less bulky derivatives. Three such derivatives are S-nitrosotriphenylmethanethiol (Ph_{3}CSNO), tritylsulfenyl chloride (Ph_{3}CSCl), and trityl sulfenamide (Ph_{3}CSNH_{2}).

== See also ==
- Tetraphenylmethane
- Triphenylmethanol
- Triphenylmethyl chloride
- Triphenylmethyl hexafluorophosphate
- Triphenylmethyl radical
