= Triphenylmethyl radical =

- Kekulé, skeletal formula of the triphenylmethyl radical

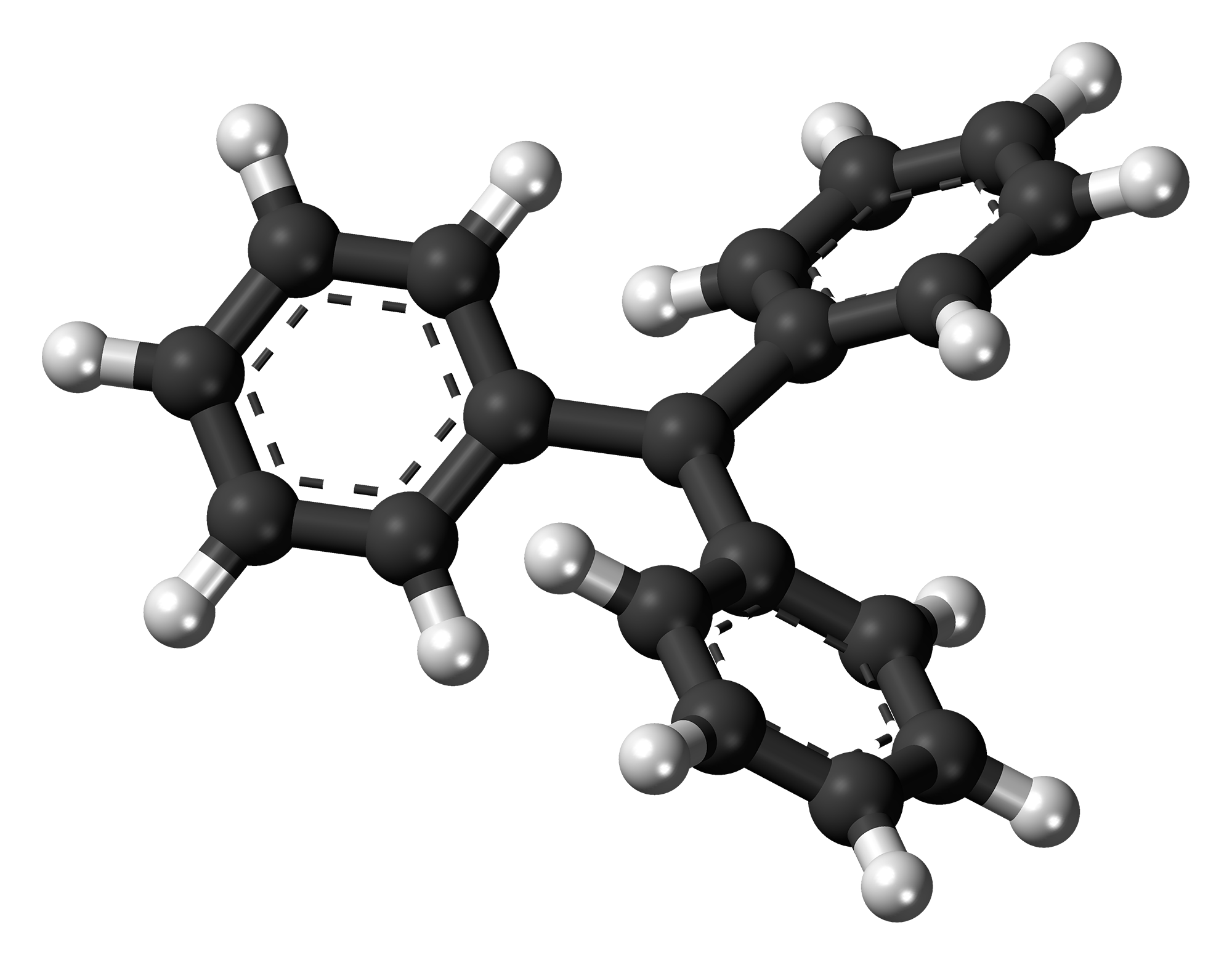

Names
- Preferred IUPAC name Triphenylmethyl

Identifiers
CAS Number	2216-49-1
3D model (JSmol)	Interactive image; Interactive image
ChemSpider	10627185
PubChem CID	5374035
CompTox Dashboard (EPA)	DTXSID501316922
- InChI: InChI=1S/C19H15/c1-4-10-16(11-5-1)19(17-12-6-2-7-13-17)18-14-8-3-9-15-18/h1-15H Key: OHSJPLSEQNCRLW-UHFFFAOYSA-N
- SMILES: c1ccc(cc1)[C](c1ccccc1)c1ccccc1; C1=CC=C(C=C1)[C](C1=CC=CC=C1)C1=CC=CC=C1

Properties
Chemical formula	C_{19}H_{15}
Molar mass	243.329 g·mol^{−1}
- Except where otherwise noted, data are given for materials in their standard state (at 25 °C [77 °F], 100 kPa). verify (what is ?) Infobox references

The triphenylmethyl radical (often shortened to trityl radical after 1927 suggestion by Helferich et al.) is an organic compound with the formula (C_{6}H_{5})_{3}C. It is a persistent radical. It was the first radical to be described in organic chemistry. Because of its accessibility, the trityl radical has been heavily investigated.

== Preparation and properties ==
The triphenylmethyl radical can be prepared by reduction of triphenylmethyl chloride. A variety of reductants can be employed including silver.

(C_{6}H_{5})_{3}CCl + Ag → (C_{6}H_{5})_{3}C· + AgCl

The trityl radical exists in a chemical equilibrium with the quinoid-type dimer, called Gomberg's dimer. In benzene the concentration of the radical is 2%.

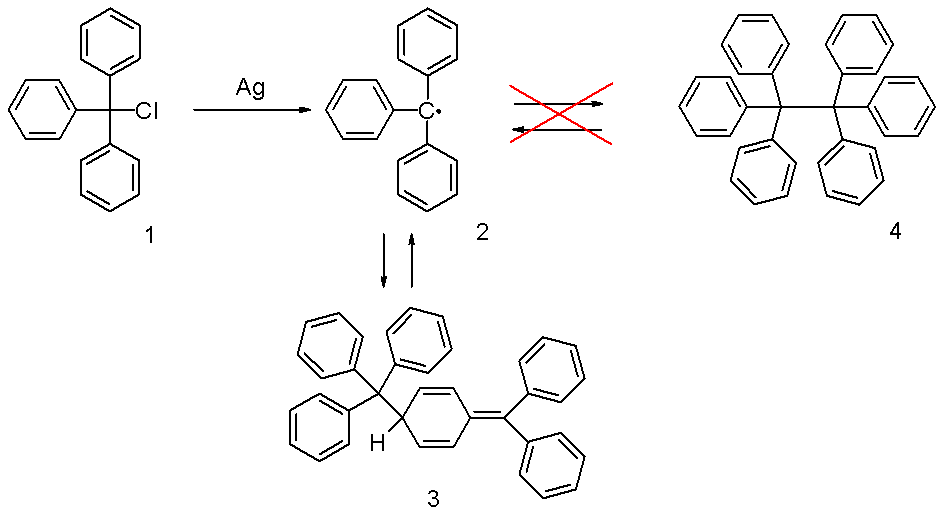
Triphenylmethyl radical

Solutions containing the radical are yellow; when the temperature of the solution is raised, the yellow color becomes more intense as the equilibrium is shifted in favor of the radical rather than the colorless dimer, in accordance with Le Chatelier's principle.

The triphenylmethyl radical exhibits green photoluminescence. Further reaction of the quinoid dimer with another triphenylmethyl radical produces a quinoid radical that exhibits red photoluminescence.

When exposed to air, the radical rapidly oxidizes to the peroxide, and the color of the solution changes from yellow to colorless. Likewise, the radical reacts with iodine to triphenylmethyl iodide.

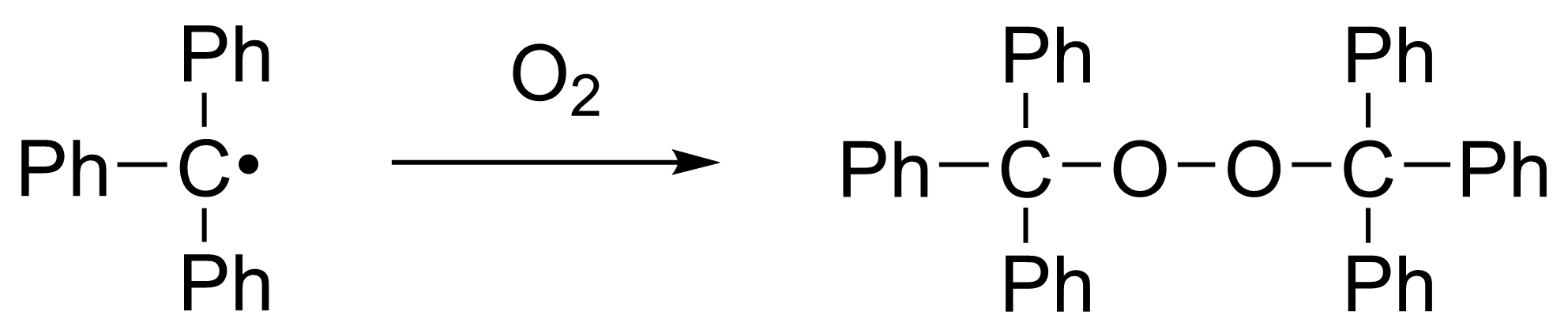
Triphenylmethyl radical oxidation

== Trityl derivatives ==
Whereas the triphenyl radical forms a quinoid dimer, substitution at the para ring positions inhibits dimer formation entirely. Other derivatives of the triphenyl radical with certain substituted phenyl groups do form dimers with a hexaphenylethane-like structure. For example, the tris(3,5-di-tert-butylphenyl) radical dimerizes to give hexakis(3,5-di-t-butylphenyl)ethane, with a bond length of 1.67 Å for the central carbon–carbon bond. Theoretical calculations on a very high level of theory indicate that van der Waals attraction between the tert-butyl groups create a potential minimum that is absent in the unsubstituted molecule. Other derivatives have been reported as the quinoid dimer

== History ==
The radical was discovered by Moses Gomberg in 1900 at the University of Michigan. He tried to prepare hexaphenylethane from triphenylmethyl chloride and zinc in benzene in a Wurtz reaction and found that the product, based on its behaviour towards iodine and oxygen, was far more reactive than anticipated. The discovered structure was used in the development of ESR spectroscopy and confirmed by it. The triphenylmethyl radical, and the larger class of triarylmethyl radicals, are called Gomberg radicals.

The quinoid structure for the dimer was suggested as early as 1904 but this structure was soon after abandoned in favor of hexaphenylethane (4). It subsequently took until 1968 for its rediscovery when researchers at the Vrije Universiteit Amsterdam published proton NMR data.

== See also ==
- Triphenylmethyl hexafluorophosphate
- Triphenylmethane
- Triarylmethane dye
- Trivalent group 14 radicals
