= Potassium =

Potassium, _{19}K
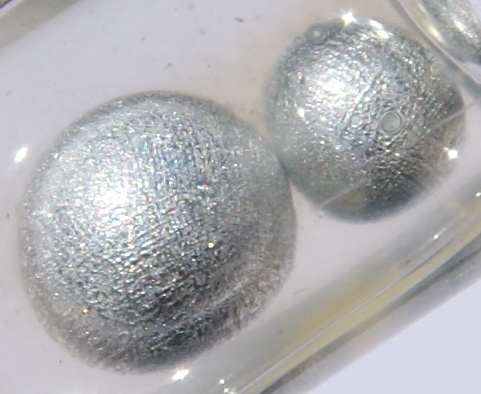
- Potassium pearls (in paraffin oil, ~5 mm each)

Potassium
- Appearance: silvery white, faint bluish-purple hue when exposed to air

Standard atomic weight A_{r}°(K)
- 39.0983±0.0001; 39.098±0.001 (abridged)

Potassium in the periodic table
Hydrogen																															Helium
Lithium	Beryllium																									Boron	Carbon	Nitrogen	Oxygen	Fluorine	Neon
Sodium	Magnesium																									Aluminium	Silicon	Phosphorus	Sulfur	Chlorine	Argon
Potassium	Calcium															Scandium	Titanium	Vanadium	Chromium	Manganese	Iron	Cobalt	Nickel	Copper	Zinc	Gallium	Germanium	Arsenic	Selenium	Bromine	Krypton
Rubidium	Strontium															Yttrium	Zirconium	Niobium	Molybdenum	Technetium	Ruthenium	Rhodium	Palladium	Silver	Cadmium	Indium	Tin	Antimony	Tellurium	Iodine	Xenon
Caesium	Barium	Lanthanum	Cerium	Praseodymium	Neodymium	Promethium	Samarium	Europium	Gadolinium	Terbium	Dysprosium	Holmium	Erbium	Thulium	Ytterbium	Lutetium	Hafnium	Tantalum	Tungsten	Rhenium	Osmium	Iridium	Platinum	Gold	Mercury (element)	Thallium	Lead	Bismuth	Polonium	Astatine	Radon
Francium	Radium	Actinium	Thorium	Protactinium	Uranium	Neptunium	Plutonium	Americium	Curium	Berkelium	Californium	Einsteinium	Fermium	Mendelevium	Nobelium	Lawrencium	Rutherfordium	Dubnium	Seaborgium	Bohrium	Hassium	Meitnerium	Darmstadtium	Roentgenium	Copernicium	Nihonium	Flerovium	Moscovium	Livermorium	Tennessine	Oganesson
Na
↑
K
↓
Rb
argon ← potassium → calcium
- Atomic number (Z): 19
- Group: group 1: hydrogen and alkali metals
- Period: period 4
- Block: s-block
- Electron configuration: [Ar] 4s^{1}
- Electrons per shell: 2, 8, 8, 1

Physical properties
- Phase at STP: solid
- Melting point: 336.7 K (63.5 °C, 146.3 °F)
- Boiling point: 1030.793 K (757.643 °C, 1395.757 °F)
- Density (at 20° C): 0.8590 g/cm^{3}
- when liquid (at m.p.): 0.82948 g/cm^{3}
- Critical point: 2223 K, 16 MPa
- Heat of fusion: 2.33 kJ/mol
- Heat of vaporization: 76.9 kJ/mol
- Molar heat capacity: 29.6 J/(mol·K)
- Specific heat capacity: 757.072 J/(kg·K)

Atomic properties
- Oxidation states: common: +1 −1
- Electronegativity: Pauling scale: 0.82
- Ionization energies: 1st: 418.8 kJ/mol; 2nd: 3052 kJ/mol; 3rd: 4420 kJ/mol; (more)
- Atomic radius: empirical: 227 pm
- Covalent radius: 203±12 pm
- Van der Waals radius: 275 pm
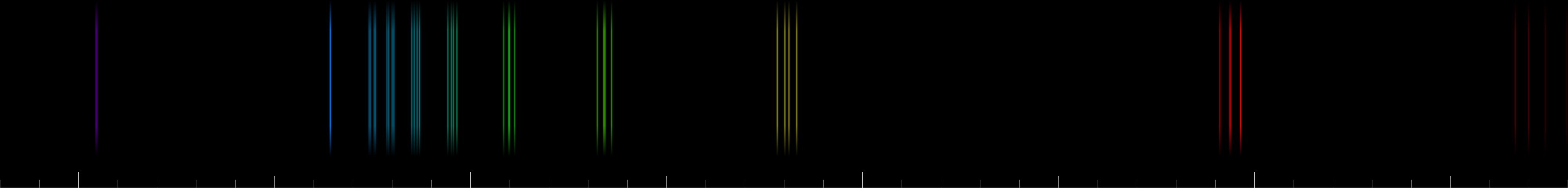
- Spectral lines of potassium

Other properties
- Natural occurrence: primordial
- Crystal structure: body-centered cubic (bcc) (cI2)
- Lattice constant: a = 532.69 pm (at 20 °C)
- Thermal expansion: 77.37×10^{−6}/K (at 20 °C)
- Thermal conductivity: 102.5 W/(m⋅K)
- Electrical resistivity: 72 nΩ⋅m (at 20 °C)
- Magnetic ordering: paramagnetic
- Molar magnetic susceptibility: +20.8×10^{−6} cm^{3}/mol (298 K)
- Young's modulus: 3.53 GPa
- Shear modulus: 1.3 GPa
- Bulk modulus: 3.1 GPa
- Speed of sound thin rod: 2000 m/s (at 20 °C)
- Mohs hardness: 0.4
- Brinell hardness: 0.363 MPa
- CAS Number: 7440-09-7

History
- Naming: after potash, from which it was first isolated
- Discovery and first isolation: Humphry Davy (1807)
- Symbol: "K": from New Latin kalium

Isotopes of potassium
Main isotopes			Decay	
Isotope	abundance	half-life (t_{1/2})	mode	product
^{39}K	93.258%	stable		
^{40}K	0.0117%	1.248×10^{9} y	β^{−}	^{40}Ca
^{40}K	0.0117%	1.248×10^{9} y	ε	^{40}Ar
^{40}K	0.0117%	1.248×10^{9} y	β^{+}	^{40}Ar
^{41}K	6.730%	stable		

Potassium is a chemical element; it has symbol K (from Neo-Latin kalium) and atomic number 19. It is a silvery white metal that is soft enough to easily cut with a knife. Potassium metal reacts rapidly with atmospheric oxygen to form flaky white potassium peroxide in only seconds of exposure. It was first isolated from potash, the ashes of plants, from which its name derives. In the periodic table, potassium is one of the alkali metals, all of which have a single valence electron in the outer electron shell, which is easily removed to create an ion with a positive charge (which combines with anions to form salts). In nature, potassium occurs only in ionic salts. Elemental potassium reacts vigorously with water, generating sufficient heat to ignite hydrogen resulting from the reaction; it appears lilac colored in a flame test. It is found dissolved in seawater (which is 0.04% potassium by weight), and occurs in many minerals such as orthoclase, a common constituent of granites and other igneous rocks.

Potassium is chemically very similar to sodium, the previous element in group 1 of the periodic table. They have a similar first ionization energy, which allows for each atom to give up its sole outer electron. It was first suggested in 1702 that they were distinct elements that combine with the same anions to make similar salts, which was demonstrated in 1807 when elemental potassium was first isolated via electrolysis. Naturally occurring potassium is composed of three isotopes, of which ^{40}K is radioactive. Traces of ^{40}K are found in natural sources of potassium, and it is the most common radioisotope in the human body.

Potassium ions are vital for the functioning of all living cells. The transfer of potassium ions across nerve cell membranes is necessary for normal nerve transmission; potassium deficiency and excess can each result in numerous signs and symptoms, including an abnormal heart rhythm and various electrocardiographic abnormalities. Fresh fruits and vegetables are good dietary sources of potassium. The body responds to the influx of dietary potassium by increasing potassium excretion by the kidneys and sequestering potassium in the liver and muscles to avoid changes in serum potassium levels.

Most industrial applications of potassium exploit the high solubility of its compounds in water, such as saltwater soap. Heavy crop production rapidly depletes the soil of potassium, and this can be remedied with agricultural fertilizers containing potassium, accounting for 95% of global potassium chemical production.

== Etymology ==
The English name for the element potassium comes from the word potash, which refers to an early method of extracting various potassium salts: placing in a pot the ash of burnt wood or tree leaves, adding water, heating, and evaporating the solution. Humphry Davy named the element potassium after isolating the metal itself.

The symbol K stems from kali, itself from the root word alkali, which in turn comes from Arabic: القَلْيَه al-qalyah 'plant ashes'. In 1797, the German chemist Martin Klaproth discovered "potash" in the minerals leucite and lepidolite, and realized that "potash" was not a product of plant growth but actually contained a new element, which he proposed calling kali. In 1807, Humphry Davy produced the element via electrolysis: in 1809, Ludwig Wilhelm Gilbert proposed the name Kalium for Davy's "potassium". In 1814, the Swedish chemist Berzelius advocated the name kalium for potassium, with the chemical symbol K.

The English and French-speaking countries adopted the name Potassium, which was favored by Davy and French chemists Joseph Louis Gay-Lussac and Louis Jacques Thénard, whereas the other Germanic countries adopted Gilbert and Klaproth's name Kalium. The "Gold Book" of the International Union of Pure and Applied Chemistry has designated the official chemical symbol as K.

== Discovery ==
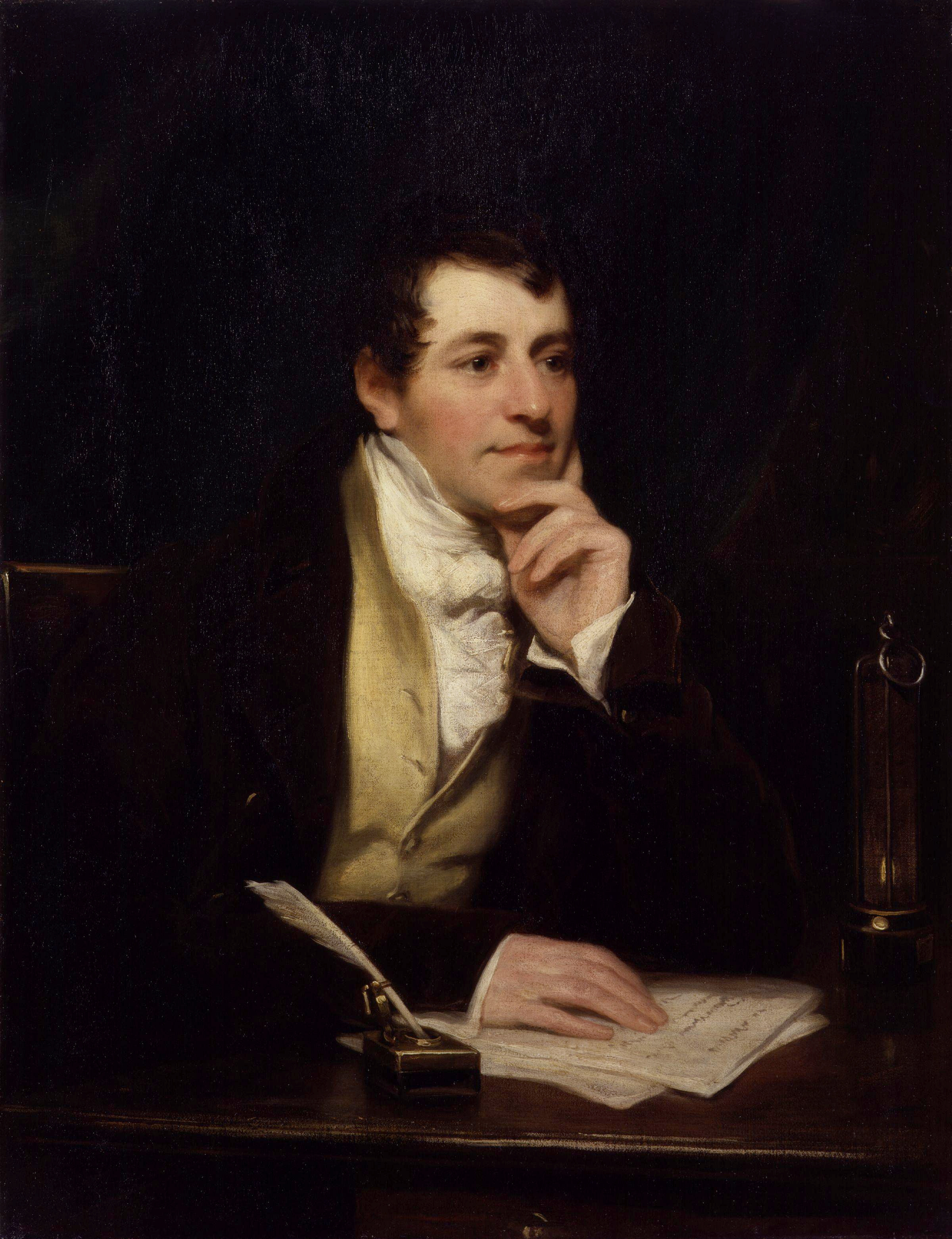
Sir Humphry Davy

Potassium metal was first isolated in 1807 by Humphry Davy, who derived it by electrolysis of molten caustic potash (KOH) with the newly discovered voltaic pile. Potassium was the first metal that was isolated by electrolysis. Later in the same year, Davy reported extraction of the metal sodium from a mineral derivative (caustic soda, NaOH, or lye) rather than a plant salt, by a similar technique, demonstrating that the elements, and thus the salts, are different. Although the production of potassium and sodium metal should have shown that both are elements, it took some time before this view was universally accepted.

== Properties ==
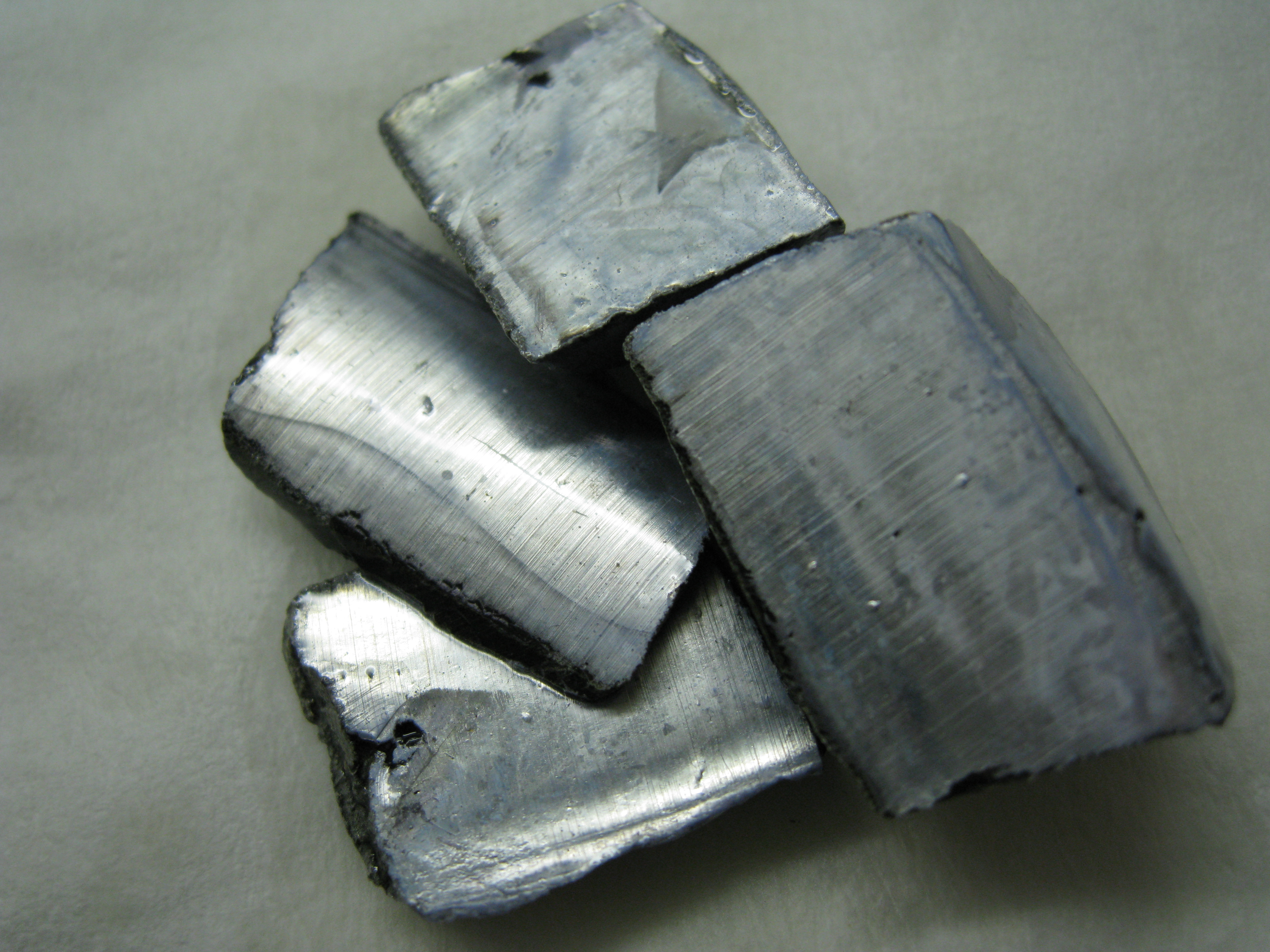
Pieces of potassium metal

Potassium is a soft silvery solid that is easily cut with a knife. Because of the sensitivity of potassium to water and air, air-free techniques are normally employed for handling the element. It is unreactive toward nitrogen and saturated hydrocarbons such as mineral oil or kerosene. It readily dissolves in liquid ammonia, up to 480 g per 1000 g of ammonia at 0 °C to form the electride [K(NH_{3})_{6}]^{+}e^{−}, which features an electron as an anion.

=== Compounds ===
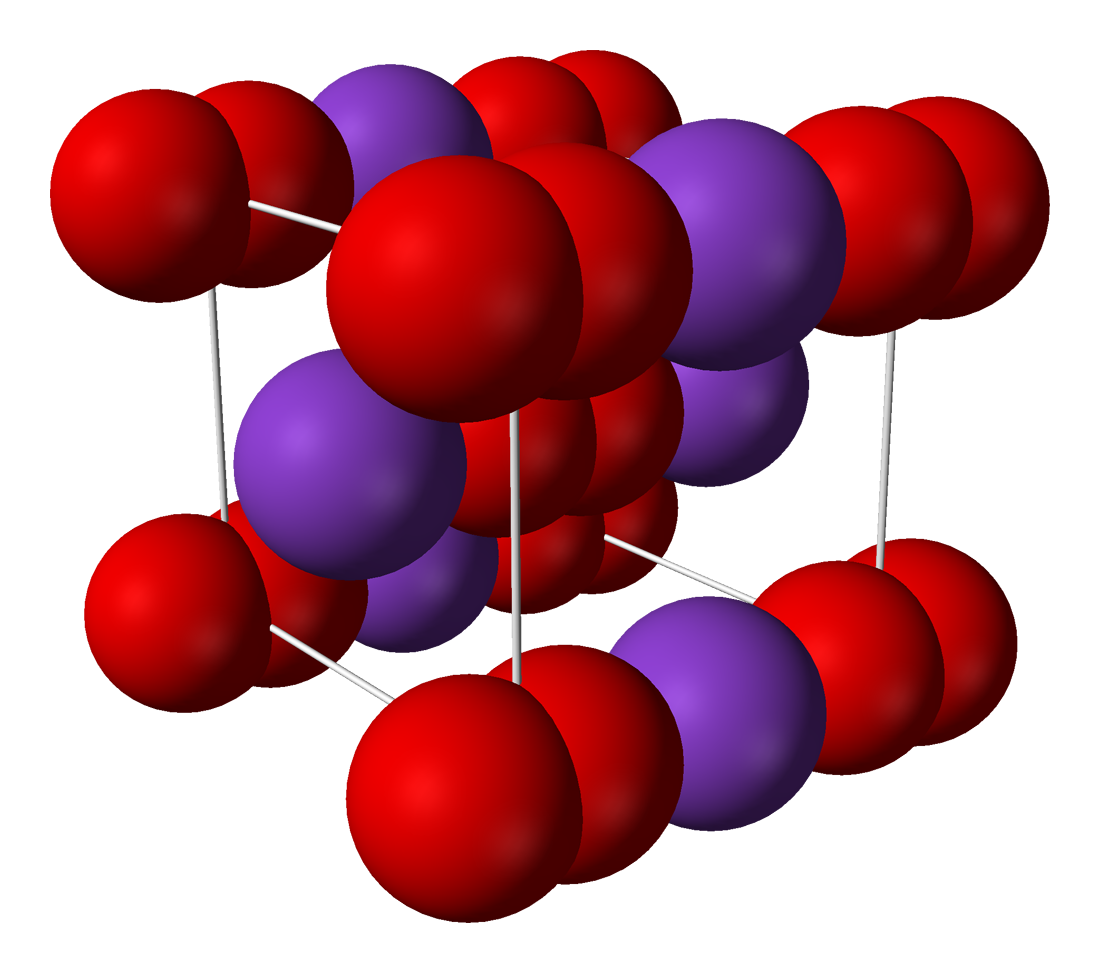
Structure of solid potassium superoxide (KO_{2})

Reflecting its low first ionization energy of 418.8 kJ/mol, potassium is a strong reducing agent, i.e., it readily releases an electron upon contact with other materials. With graphite, potassium metal forms graphite intercalation compounds. One such compound has the formula KC_{8}, a gold colored solid that is described as a K^{+} salt of negatively charged graphite. Potassium can reduce many salts to the metal as illustrated by the Rieke method for making magnesium powder from magnesium chloride:

MgCl_{2} + 2 K → Mg + 2 KCl

Most potassium compounds are ionic. Owing to the high hydration energy of the K^{+} ion, these salts often exhibit excellent water solubility. The main species in water solution are the aquo complexes [K(H_{2}O)_{n}]^{+} where n = 6 and 7. Although typically insoluble in organic solvents, potassium salts dissolve in polar organic solvents in the presence of crown ethers and cryptand. These organic ligands envelop K^{+} ions, giving lipophilic coordination complexes. Similar complexation phenomena are found for some ion-binding antibiotics.

==== Binary compounds ====
Potassium forms many binary compounds, i.e., compounds of potassium and one other element. The inventory is so extensive that one gap merits mention: no nitride of potassium is known. Potassium hydride forms directly from the elements:

2 K + H_{2} → 2 KH

It is a white, pyrophoric solid that finds some use as a base.

All of the halides salts are well known: potassium fluoride (KF), potassium chloride (KCl), potassium bromide (KBr), and potassium iodide (KI). Four oxides of potassium are well studied: potassium oxide (K_{2}O), potassium peroxide (K_{2}O_{2}), potassium superoxide (KO_{2}) and potassium ozonide (KO_{3}). These species all hydrolyze (react with water) to give potassium hydroxide. Similarly an extensive array of sulfides, selenides, and tellurides are well characterized. Although such simple salts are typically white and diamagnetic, KO_{2} is something of an exception, being deep yellow and paramagnetic.

==== Ternary and more complex compounds ====
Although rarely encountered in anhydrous form, KOH is one of the dominant compounds of potassium from the commercial perspective. It is a strong base and highly corrosive. Illustrative of its hydrophilic character, as much as 1.21 kg of KOH can dissolve in a liter of water. KOH reacts readily with carbon dioxide (CO_{2}) to produce potassium carbonate (K_{2}CO_{3}), and in principle could be used to remove traces of the gas from air. Like the closely related sodium hydroxide, KOH reacts with fats to produce soaps. Potassium-based soaps are used in soap dispensers because they more soluble in water than sodium soaps.

Nitrate, nitrite, sulfate, and various phosphates also form potassium salts, all white solids, that are widely used. Illustrating the thermal stability typical for these materials, potassium nitrate, sodium nitrate, and sodium nitrite form a eutectic, which remains liquid from 142 to 600 °C.

Sodium and potassium salts display virtually identical properties in aqueous solution, but their differing solubilities are of practical value. The distinctive solubility of potassium heptafluorotantalate (K_{2}[TaF_{7}]) allows the purification of tantalum from the otherwise persistent contaminant of niobium. The solubility of the K^{+} compound differs strikingly from that for the Na^{+} compound in the pairs sodium tetraphenylborate/potassium tetraphenylborate, sodium cobaltinitrite/potassium cobaltinitrite, and sodium hexachloroplatinate/ potassium hexachloroplatinate. These differences are the bases for gravimetric analysis for K^{+}.

Several potassium-containing reagents, so-called primary standards, have the advantage of being non-hygroscopic, in contrast the corresponding sodium salts. Thus, the oxidant potassium dichromate, the acid potassium hydrogen phthalate, and the reductant potassium ferrocyanide can be handled in air without gaining weight by hydration. Potassium salts are often produced from the sodium salts e.g., sodium chromate and sodium permanganate, which are more directly obtained from ores.

==== Organopotassium compounds ====
Organopotassium compounds are mainly of academic interest. They feature highly polar covalent K–C bonds. An example is potassium diphenylmethyl KCH(C_{6}H_{5})_{2}.

=== Isotopes ===
There are 25 known isotopes of potassium, three of which occur naturally: ^{39}K (93.3%), ^{40}K (0.0117%), and ^{41}K (6.7%) (by mole fraction). Naturally occurring ^{40}K has a half-life of 1.250×10^{9} years. It decays to stable ^{40}Ar by electron capture or positron emission (11.2%) or to stable ^{40}Ca by beta decay (88.8%). This decay results in a relatively higher concentration of Argon in the atmosphere. The decay of ^{40}K to ^{40}Ar is the basis of a common method for dating rocks. The conventional potassium–argon dating method depends on the assumption that the rocks contained no argon at the time of formation and that all the subsequent radiogenic argon (^{40}Ar) was quantitatively retained. Minerals are dated by measurement of the concentration of potassium and the amount of radiogenic ^{40}Ar that has accumulated. The minerals best suited for dating include biotite, muscovite, metamorphic hornblende, and volcanic feldspar; whole rock samples from volcanic flows and shallow instrusives can also be dated if they are unaltered. Apart from dating, potassium isotopes have been used as tracers in studies of weathering and for nutrient cycling studies because potassium is a macronutrient required for life on Earth.

^{40}K occurs in natural potassium (and thus in some commercial salt substitutes) in sufficient quantity that large bags of those substitutes can be used as a radioactive source for classroom demonstrations. ^{40}K is the radioisotope with the largest abundance in the human body. In healthy animals and people, ^{40}K represents the largest source of radioactivity, greater even than ^{14}C. In a human body of 70 kg, about 4,400 nuclei of ^{40}K decay per second. The activity of natural potassium is 31 Bq/g.

== History ==
=== Potash ===
Potash is primarily a mixture of potassium salts because plants have little or no sodium content, and the rest of a plant's major mineral content consists of calcium salts of relatively low solubility in water. While potash has been used since ancient times, its composition was not understood. Georg Ernst Stahl obtained experimental evidence that led him to suggest the fundamental difference of sodium and potassium salts in 1702, and Henri Louis Duhamel du Monceau was able to prove this difference in 1736. The exact chemical composition of potassium and sodium compounds, and the status as chemical element of potassium and sodium, was not known then, and thus Antoine Lavoisier did not include the alkali in his list of chemical elements in 1789. For a long time the only significant applications for potash were the production of glass, bleach, soap and gunpowder as potassium nitrate. Potassium soaps from animal fats and vegetable oils were especially prized because they tend to be more water-soluble and of softer texture, and are therefore known as soft soaps. The discovery by Justus Liebig in 1840 that potassium is a necessary element for plants and that most types of soil lack potassium caused a steep rise in demand for potassium salts. Wood-ash from fir trees was initially used as a potassium salt source for fertilizer, but, with the discovery in 1868 of mineral deposits containing potassium chloride near Staßfurt, Germany, the production of potassium-containing fertilizers began at an industrial scale. Other potash deposits were discovered, and by the 1960s Canada became the dominant producer.

== Occurrence ==
Potassium is formed in supernovae by nucleosynthesis from lighter atoms. Potassium is believed to be created in Type II supernovae via an oxygen-consuming nuclear reaction, probably during the explosive stage of the nova. ^{40}K is also formed in s-process nucleosynthesis and the neon burning process.

Potassium is the 20th most abundant element in the Solar System and the 17th most abundant element by weight in the Earth. It makes up about 2.6% of the weight of the Earth's crust and is the seventh most abundant element in the crust. The potassium concentration in seawater is 0.39 g/L (0.039 wt/v%), about one twenty-seventh the concentration of sodium.

=== Geology ===
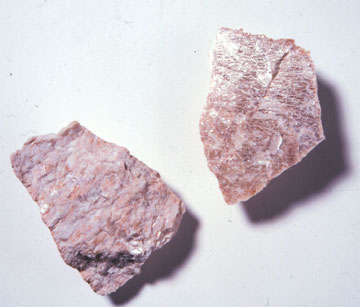
Potassium in feldspar

Elemental potassium does not occur in nature because of its high reactivity with water and oxygen.

Orthoclase (potassium feldspar) is a common rock-forming mineral. Granite for example contains 5% potassium, which is well above the average in the Earth's crust. Sylvite (KCl), carnallite (KCl·MgCl_{2}·6H_{2}O), kainite (MgSO_{4}·KCl·3H_{2}O), and langbeinite (MgSO_{4}·K_{2}SO_{4}) are the minerals found in large evaporite deposits worldwide. The deposits often show layers starting with the least soluble at the bottom and the most soluble on top. Deposits of niter (potassium nitrate) are formed by decomposition of organic material in contact with atmosphere, mostly in caves; because of the good water solubility of niter the formation of larger deposits requires special environmental conditions.

== Commercial production ==
=== Mining ===
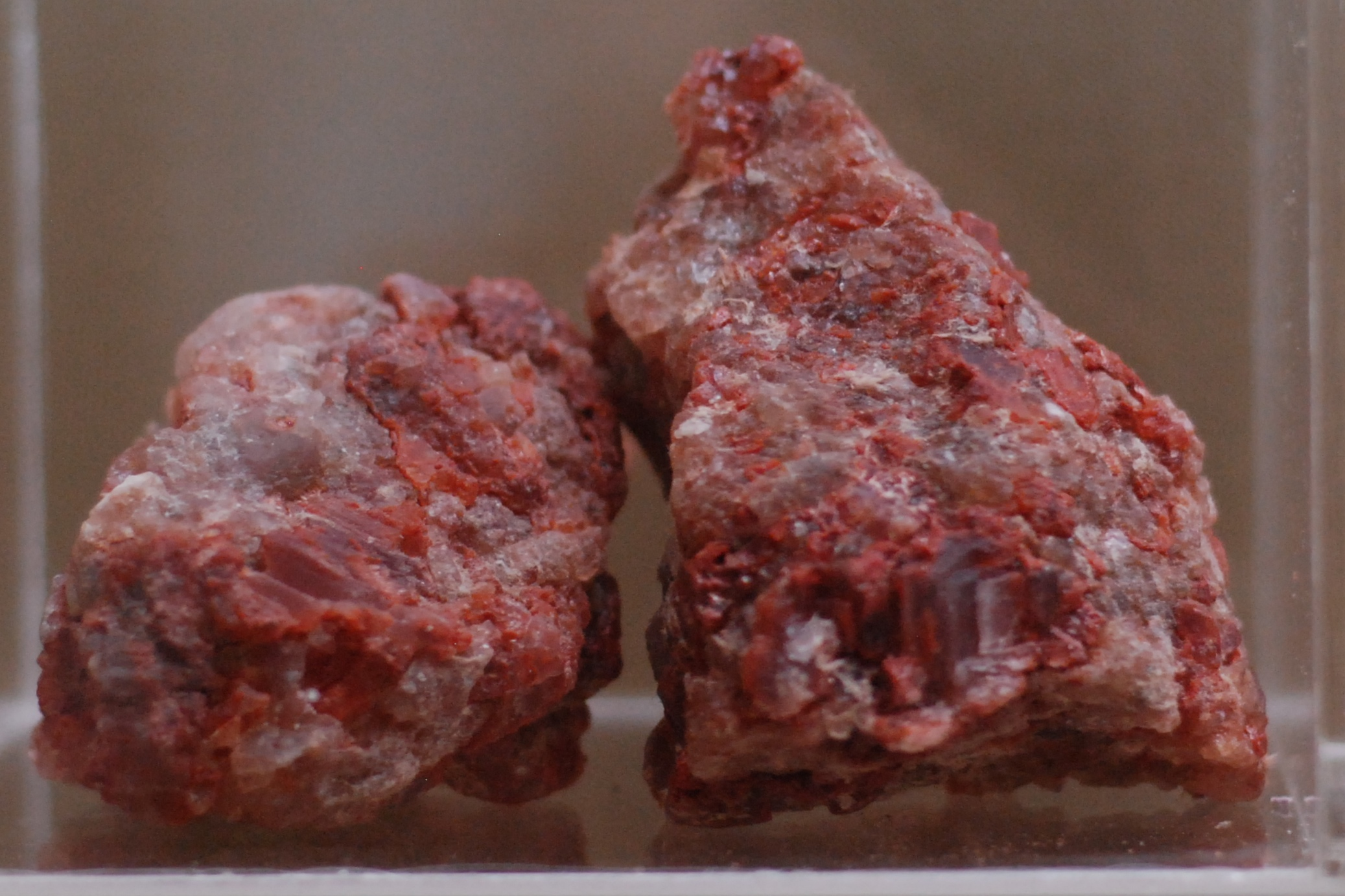
Sylvite from New Mexico

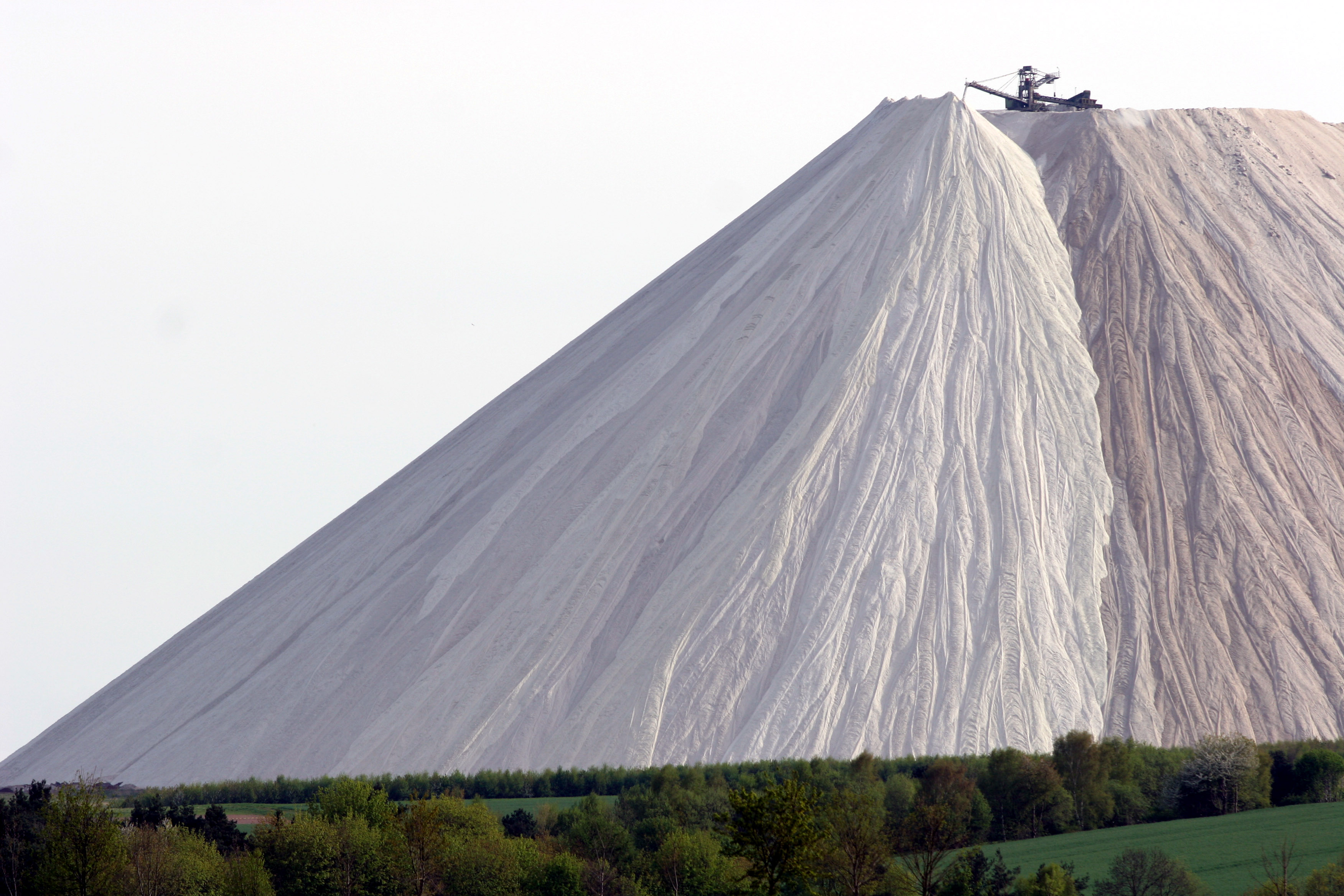
Monte Kali, a potash mining and beneficiation waste heap in Hesse, Germany, consisting mostly of sodium chloride

Potassium salts such as carnallite, langbeinite, polyhalite, and sylvite form extensive evaporite deposits in ancient lake bottoms and seabeds, making extraction of potassium salts in these environments commercially viable. The principal source of potassium – potash – is mined in Canada, Russia, Belarus, Kazakhstan, Germany, Israel, the U.S., Jordan, and other places around the world. The first mined deposits were located near Staßfurt, Germany, but the deposits span from Great Britain over Germany into Poland. They are located in the Zechstein and were deposited in the Middle to Late Permian. Canada leads the world production of potash; the easiest deposits to mine lie 1,000 meters (3,300 feet) below the surface of the Canadian province of Saskatchewan. The water of the Dead Sea is used by Israel and Jordan as a source of potash, while the concentration in normal oceans is too low for commercial production at current prices.

=== Chemical extraction ===
Several methods are used to separate potassium salts from sodium and magnesium compounds. The most-used method is fractional precipitation using the solubility differences of the salts. Electrostatic separation of the ground salt mixture is also used in some mines. The resulting sodium and magnesium waste is either stored underground or piled up in slag heaps. Most of the mined potassium mineral ends up as potassium chloride after processing. The mineral industry refers to potassium chloride either as potash, muriate of potash, or simply MOP.

Potassium metal can be isolated by electrolysis of its hydroxide in a process that has changed little since it was first used by Humphry Davy in 1807. Although the electrolysis process was developed and used in industrial scale in the 1920s, the thermal method, reacting sodium with potassium chloride in a chemical equilibrium reaction,

Na + KCl → NaCl + K,

became the dominant method in the 1950s. The production of sodium–potassium alloys is accomplished by changing the reaction time and the amount of sodium used in the reaction. The Griesheimer process employing the reaction of potassium fluoride with calcium carbide was also used to produce potassium.

2 KF + CaC_{2} → 2 K + CaF_{2} + 2 C

=== Cation identification ===
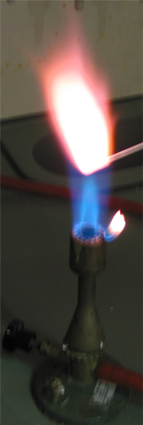
The flame test of potassium

Potassium can be detected by a flame test based on its lilac colored emission, with a peak emission wavelength of 766.5 nanometers. Potassium can be quantified by spectroscopic methods, including flame photometry and X-ray fluorescence. Traditional gravimetric analysis is still employed in the fertilizer industry (the dominant use of potassium). The main analytical reagent is hexachloroplatinic acid. Treatment of a solution containing K^{+} ions with an excess of this platinum compound quantitatively precipitates of potassium hexachloroplatinate, which is easily weighed and is non-hygroscopic:

2 K^{+} + H_{2}[PtCl_{6}] → K_{2}[PtCl_{6}] + 2 H^{+}

A similar analytical procedure yields a precipitate of potassium tetraphenylborate from sodium tetraphenylborate.

== Commercial uses ==
=== Fertilizer ===
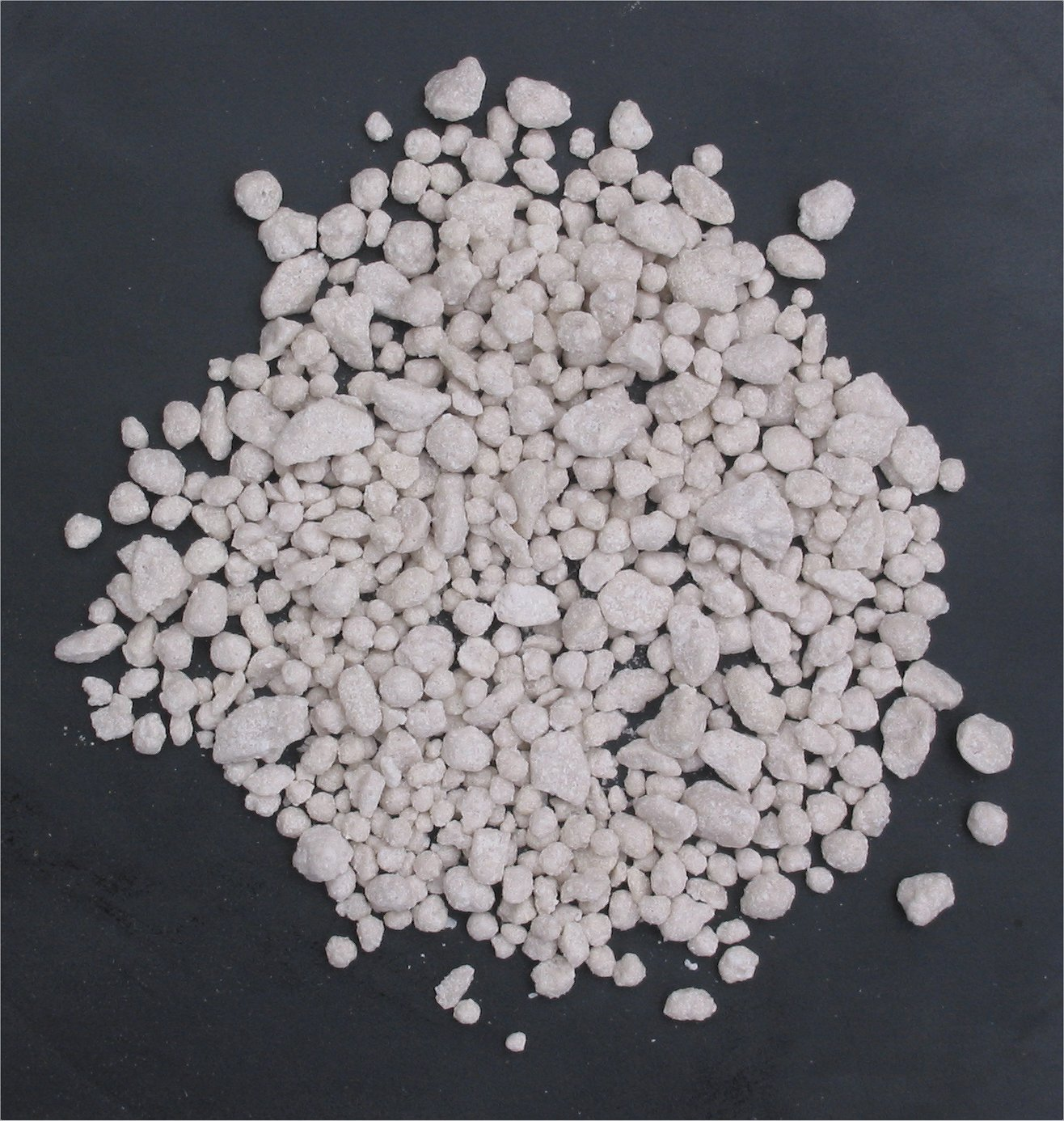
Potassium sulfate/magnesium sulfate fertilizer

Potassium ions are an essential component of plant nutrition and are found in most soil types. They are used as a fertilizer in agriculture, horticulture, and hydroponic culture in the form of chloride (KCl), sulfate (K_{2}SO_{4}), or nitrate (KNO_{3}), representing the 'K' in 'NPK'. Agricultural fertilizers consume 95% of global potassium chemical production, and about 90% of this potassium is supplied as KCl. The potassium content of most plants ranges from 0.5% to 2% of the harvested weight of crops, conventionally expressed as amount of K_{2}O. Modern high-yield agriculture depends upon fertilizers to replace the potassium lost at harvest. Most agricultural fertilizers contain potassium chloride, while potassium sulfate is used for chloride-sensitive crops or crops needing higher sulfur content. The sulfate is produced mostly by decomposition of the complex minerals kainite (MgSO_{4}·KCl·3H_{2}O) and langbeinite (MgSO_{4}·K_{2}SO_{4}). Only a very few fertilizers contain potassium nitrate. In 2005, about 93% of world potassium production was consumed by the fertilizer industry. Furthermore, potassium can play a key role in nutrient cycling by controlling litter composition.

=== Medical use ===
==== Potassium citrate ====
Potassium citrate is used to treat a kidney stone condition called renal tubular acidosis.

==== Potassium chloride ====
Potassium, in the form of potassium chloride is used as a medication to treat and prevent low blood potassium. Low blood potassium may occur due to vomiting, diarrhea, or certain medications. It is given by slow injection into a vein or by mouth.

=== Food additives ===
Potassium sodium tartrate (KNaC_{4}H_{4}O_{6}, Rochelle salt) is a main constituent of some varieties of baking powder; it is also used in the silvering of mirrors. Potassium bromate (KBrO_{3}) is a strong oxidizer (E924), used to improve dough strength and rise height. Potassium bisulfite (KHSO_{3}) is used as a food preservative, for example in wine and beer-making (but not in meats). It is also used to bleach textiles and straw, and in the tanning of leathers.

=== Industrial ===
Major potassium chemicals are potassium hydroxide, potassium carbonate, potassium sulfate, and potassium chloride. Megatons of these compounds are produced annually.

KOH is a strong base, which is used in industry to neutralize strong and weak acids, to control pH and to manufacture potassium salts. It is also used to saponify fats and oils, in industrial cleaners, and in hydrolysis reactions, for example of esters.

Potassium nitrate (KNO_{3}) or saltpeter is obtained from natural sources such as guano and evaporites or manufactured via the Haber process; it is the oxidant in gunpowder (black powder) and an important agricultural fertilizer. Potassium cyanide (KCN) is used industrially to dissolve copper and precious metals, in particular silver and gold, by forming complexes. Its applications include gold mining, electroplating, and electroforming of these metals; it is also used in organic synthesis to make nitriles. Potassium carbonate (K_{2}CO_{3} or potash) is used in the manufacture of glass, soap, color TV tubes, fluorescent lamps, textile dyes and pigments. Potassium permanganate (KMnO_{4}) is an oxidizing, bleaching and purification substance and is used for production of saccharin. Potassium chlorate (KClO_{3}) is added to matches and explosives. Potassium bromide (KBr) was formerly used as a sedative and in photography.

While potassium chromate (K_{2}CrO_{4}) is used in the manufacture of a host of different commercial products such as inks, dyes, wood stains (by reacting with the tannic acid in wood), explosives, fireworks, fly paper, and safety matches, as well as in the tanning of leather, all of these uses are due to the chemistry of the chromate ion rather than to that of the potassium ion.

==== Niche uses ====
There are thousands of uses of various potassium compounds. One example is potassium superoxide, KO_{2}, an orange solid that acts as a portable source of oxygen and a carbon dioxide absorber. It is widely used in respiration systems in mines, submarines and spacecraft as it takes less volume than the gaseous oxygen.

4 KO_{2} + 2 CO_{2} → 2 K_{2}CO_{3} + 3 O_{2}

Another example is potassium cobaltinitrite, K_{3}[Co(NO_{2})_{6}], which is used as artist's pigment under the name of Aureolin or Cobalt Yellow.

The stable isotopes of potassium can be laser cooled and used to probe fundamental and technological problems in quantum physics. The two bosonic isotopes possess convenient Feshbach resonances to enable studies requiring tunable interactions, while ^{40}K is one of only two stable fermions amongst the alkali metals.

==== Laboratory uses ====
An alloy of sodium and potassium, NaK is a liquid used as a heat-transfer medium and a desiccant for producing dry and air-free solvents. It can also be used in reactive distillation. The ternary alloy of 12% Na, 47% K and 41% Cs has the lowest melting point of −78 °C of any metallic compound.

Metallic potassium is used in several types of magnetometers.

== Biological role ==
=== Plants ===
Potassium is crucial for diverse plant species. It has a vital role in maintaining cell sap and internal root pressure required for plant growth. Potassium increases plant metabolism and uptake of carbon dioxide.

=== Human physiology ===
Potassium is the eighth or ninth most common element by mass (0.2%) in the human body, so that a 60 kg adult contains a total of about 120 g of potassium. The body has about as much potassium as sulfur and chlorine, and only calcium and phosphorus are more abundant (with the exception of the ubiquitous CHON elements). Potassium ions are present in a wide variety of proteins and enzymes. 98% of the potassium in a human body is inside of individual cells.

=== Biochemical function ===
Potassium levels influence multiple physiological processes, including

- resting cellular-membrane potential and the propagation of action potentials in neuronal, muscular, and cardiac tissue. Due to the electrostatic and chemical properties, K^{+} ions are larger than Na^{+} ions, and ion channels and pumps in cell membranes can differentiate between the two ions, actively pumping or passively passing one of the two ions while blocking the other.
- hormone secretion and action
- vascular tone
- systemic blood pressure control
- gastrointestinal motility
- acid–base homeostasis
- glucose and insulin metabolism
- mineralocorticoid action
- renal concentrating ability
- fluid and electrolyte balance
- local cortical monoaminergic norepinephrine, serotonin, and dopamine levels, and through them, sleep/wake balance, and spontaneous activity.

=== Homeostasis ===
Almost all cells have a sodium–potassium pump transporting sodium ions out and potassium ions in, maintaining a balance in a narrow range of concentrations essential to cell function. This internal homeostasis mechanism requires an external homeostasis mechanism to maintain the concentration of potassium ions in plasma in the intercellular space. External homeostasis is primarily provided by the kidneys.

The action of the sodium–potassium pump is an example of primary active transport. The two carrier proteins embedded in the cell membrane on the left are using ATP to move sodium out of the cell against the concentration gradient; The two proteins on the right are using secondary active transport to move potassium into the cell. This process results in reconstitution of ATP.

==== Internal (cellular) homeostasis ====
The ion transport system moves potassium across the cell membrane using two mechanisms. One is active and pumps sodium out of, and potassium into, the cell. The other is passive and allows potassium to leak out of the cell. Potassium and sodium cations influence fluid distribution between intracellular and extracellular compartments by osmotic forces. The movement of potassium and sodium through the cell membrane is mediated by the Na⁺/K⁺-ATPase pump. This ion pump uses ATP to pump three sodium ions out of the cell and two potassium ions into the cell, creating an electrochemical gradient and electromotive force across the cell membrane. The highly selective potassium ion channels (which are tetramers) are crucial for hyperpolarization inside neurons after an action potential is triggered, to cite one example. The most recently discovered potassium ion channel is KirBac3.1, which makes a total of five potassium ion channels (KcsA, KirBac1.1, KirBac3.1, KvAP, and MthK) with a determined structure. All five are from prokaryotic species.

Potassium can be sequestered in the liver and muscle. This potassium can be released into the extra-cellular plasma between meals to maintain potassium levels.

==== Plasma levels ====
Plasma potassium is normally kept at 3.5 to 5.5 millimoles (mmol) [or milliequivalents (mEq)] per liter by multiple mechanisms. Even narrower ranges are required to reduce mortality for patients with acute myocardial infarction.

An average meal of 40–50 mmol presents the body with more potassium than is present in all plasma (20–25 mmol). Renal and extrarenal mechanisms external homeostasis mechanisms limit the rise in plasma potassium to less than 10%.

Hypokalemia, a deficiency of potassium in the plasma, can be fatal if severe. Common causes are increased gastrointestinal loss (vomiting, diarrhea), and increased renal loss (diuresis). Deficiency symptoms include muscle weakness, paralytic ileus, ECG abnormalities, decreased reflex response; and in severe cases, respiratory paralysis, alkalosis, and cardiac arrhythmia.

==== External (plasma-level) homeostasis ====
Potassium content in the plasma is tightly controlled by three basic mechanisms:

1. a reactive negative-feedback system,
2. a reactive feed-forward system, and
3. a predictive or circadian system,

The reactive negative-feedback system refers to the system that induces renal secretion of potassium in response to a rise in the plasma potassium (potassium ingestion, shift out of cells, or intravenous infusion).

The reactive feed-forward system refers to an incompletely understood system that induces renal potassium secretion in response to potassium ingestion prior to any rise in the plasma potassium. This is probably initiated by gut cell potassium receptors that detect ingested potassium and trigger vagal afferent signals to the pituitary gland.

The predictive or circadian system increases renal secretion of potassium during mealtime hours (e.g. daytime for humans, nighttime for rodents) independent of the presence, amount, or absence of potassium ingestion. It is mediated by a circadian oscillator in the suprachiasmatic nucleus of the brain (central clock), which causes the kidney (peripheral clock) to secrete potassium in this rhythmic circadian fashion.

==== Renal filtration, reabsorption, and excretion ====
Potassium ions are reabsorbed from blood plasma entering the glomeruli into the renal tubule of the kidneys. Only a small amount of potassium reaches the distal nephron.

Renal handling of potassium is closely connected to sodium handling. Potassium is the major cation (positive ion) inside animal cells (150 mmol/L, 4.8 g/L), while sodium is the major cation of extracellular fluid (150 mmol/L, 3.345 g/L). In the kidneys, about 180 liters of plasma is filtered through the glomeruli and into the renal tubules per day. Sodium is reabsorbed to maintain extracellular volume, osmotic pressure, and serum sodium concentration within narrow limits. Potassium is reabsorbed to maintain serum potassium concentration within narrow limits. Sodium pumps in the renal tubules operate to reabsorb sodium. Potassium must be conserved, but because the amount of potassium in the blood plasma is very small and the pool of potassium in the cells is about 30 times as large, the situation is not so critical for potassium. Since potassium is moved passively in counter flow to sodium in response to an apparent (but not actual) Donnan equilibrium, the urine can never sink below the concentration of potassium in serum except sometimes by actively excreting water at the end of the processing. Potassium is excreted twice and reabsorbed three times before the urine reaches the collecting tubules.

With no potassium intake, it is excreted at about 200 mg per day until, in about a week, potassium in the serum declines to a mildly deficient level of 3.0–3.5 mmol/L. If potassium is still withheld, the concentration continues to fall until a severe deficiency causes eventual death.

The potassium moves passively through pores in the cell membrane. When ions move through ion transporters (pumps) there is a gate in the pumps on both sides of the cell membrane and only one gate can be open at once. As a result, approximately 100 ions are forced through per second. Ion channels have only one gate, and there only one kind of ion can stream through, at 10 million to 100 million ions per second. Calcium is required to open the pores, although calcium may work in reverse by blocking at least one of the pores. Carbonyl groups inside the pore on the amino acids mimic the water hydration that takes place in water solution by the nature of the electrostatic charges on four carbonyl groups inside the pore.

=== Nutrition ===
==== Dietary recommendations ====
===== North America =====
The U.S. National Academy of Medicine (NAM), on behalf of both the U.S. and Canada, sets Dietary Reference Intakes, including Estimated Average Requirements (EARs) and Recommended Dietary Allowances (RDAs), or Adequate Intakes (AIs) for when there is not sufficient information to set EARs and RDAs. For both males and females under 9 years of age, the AIs for potassium are: 400 mg of potassium for 0 to 6-month-old infants, 860 mg of potassium for 7 to 12-month-old infants, 2,000 mg of potassium for 1 to 3-year-old children, and 2,300 mg of potassium for 4 to 8-year-old children. For males 9 years of age and older, the AIs for potassium are: 2,500 mg of potassium for 9 to 13-year-old males, 3,000 mg of potassium for 14 to 18-year-old males, and 3,400 mg for males that are 19 years of age and older. For females 9 years of age and older, the AIs for potassium are: 2,300 mg of potassium for 9 to 18-year-old females, and 2,600 mg of potassium for females that are 19 years of age and older. For pregnant and lactating females, the AIs for potassium are: 2,600 mg of potassium for 14 to 18-year-old pregnant females, 2,900 mg for pregnant females that are 19 years of age and older; furthermore, 2,500 mg of potassium for 14 to 18-year-old lactating females, and 2,800 mg for lactating females that are 19 years of age and older. As for safety, the NAM also sets tolerable upper intake levels (ULs) for vitamins and minerals, but for potassium the evidence was insufficient, so no UL was established.

As of 2004, most Americans adults consume less than 3,000 mg.

===== Europe =====
Likewise, in the European Union, in particular in Germany, and Italy, insufficient potassium intake is somewhat common. The National Health Service in the United Kingdom recommends that "adults (19 to 64 years) need 3500 mg per day" and that excess amounts may cause health problems such as stomach pain and diarrhea.

==== Food sources ====
Potassium is present in all fruits, vegetables, meat and fish. Foods with high potassium concentrations include yam, parsley, dried apricots, milk, chocolate, all nuts (especially almonds and pistachios), potatoes, bamboo shoots, bananas, avocados, coconut water, soybeans, and bran.

The United States Department of Agriculture also lists tomato paste, orange juice, beet greens, white beans, plantains, and many other dietary sources of potassium, ranked in descending order according to potassium content. A day's worth of potassium is in 5 plantains or 11 bananas.

==== Deficient intake ====
Although mild hypokalemia does not cause distinct symptoms, it is a risk factor for hypertension and cardiac arrhythmia. Severe hypokalemia usually presents with hypertension, arrhythmia, muscle cramps, fatigue, weakness and constipation. Causes of hypokalemia include vomiting, diarrhea, medications like furosemide and steroids, kidney dialysis, diabetes insipidus, hyperaldosteronism, and hypomagnesemia.

==== Supplementation ====
Treating or preventing hypokalemia, a common electrolyte imbalance observed in 20% of hospital patients requires potassium supplements. There are many causes of hypokalemia, but in a clinical setting diuretics that block reabsorption of sodium and water, are the most common drug cause.

A variety of prescription and over-the counter supplements are available. Potassium chloride may be dissolved in water, but the salty/bitter taste makes liquid supplements unpalatable. Potassium is also available in tablets or capsules, which are formulated to allow potassium to leach slowly out of a matrix. The mechanism of action of potassium involves various types of transporters and channels that facilitate its movement across cell membranes. This process can lead to an increase in the pumping of hydrogen ions. This, in turn, can escalate the production of gastric acid, potentially contributing to the development of gastric ulcers. An FDA ruling in the US requires warning of this issue on any non-prescription potassium pills with more than 99 mg of potassium.

Studies of dietary potassium intake show higher intakes are correlated with lower blood pressures. Studies of potassium supplements to mitigate the impact of hypertension, thereby reducing cardiovascular risk, give conflicting conclusions. Some studies report "a modest but significant impact". Others find no effects. Potassium chloride and potassium bicarbonate may be useful to control mild hypertension. In 2020, potassium was the 33rd most commonly prescribed medication in the U.S., with more than 17 million prescriptions.

Other uses of potassium supplements include preventing the formation of kidney stones, a condition that can lead to renal complications if left untreated. Potassium has a role in bone health. It contributes to the acid-base equilibrium in the body and helps protect bone tissue. For individuals with type 2 diabetes, potassium supplementation may be necessary: potassium is essential for the secretion of insulin by pancreatic beta cells, which helps regulate glucose levels.

Excessive potassium intake can have adverse effects, such as gastrointestinal discomfort and disturbances in heart rhythm. Potassium chloride tablets are specifically associated with pill esophagitis.

==== Detection by taste buds ====
Potassium can be detected by taste because it triggers three of the five types of taste sensations, according to concentration. Dilute solutions of potassium ions taste sweet, allowing moderate concentrations in milk and juices, while higher concentrations become increasingly bitter/alkaline, and finally also salty to the taste. The combined bitterness and saltiness of high-potassium solutions makes high-dose potassium supplementation by liquid drinks a palatability challenge. As a food additive, potassium chloride has a salty taste. People wishing to increase their potassium intake or to decrease their sodium intake, after checking with a health professional that it is safe to do so, can substitute potassium chloride for some or all of the sodium chloride (table salt) used in cooking and at the table.

== Precautions ==
Potassium
Hazards
- GHS labelling
Pictograms	(GHS02: Flammable) (GHS05: Corrosive)
Signal word	Danger
Hazard statements	H260, H314
Precautionary statements	P223, P231+P232, P280, P305+P351+P338, P370+P378, P422
NFPA 704 (fire diamond)	3 3 2 W

Potassium metal can react violently with water producing KOH and hydrogen gas.

2 K(s) + 2 H_{2}O(l) → 2 KOH(aq) + H_{2}(g)↑

A reaction of potassium metal with water. Hydrogen is produced, and with potassium vapor, burns with a pink or lilac flame. Strongly alkaline potassium hydroxide is formed in solution.

This reaction is exothermic and releases sufficient heat to ignite the resulting hydrogen in the presence of oxygen. Finely powdered potassium ignites in air at room temperature. The bulk metal ignites in air if heated. Because its density is 0.89 g/cm^{3}, burning potassium floats in water that exposes it to atmospheric oxygen. Many common fire extinguishing agents, including water, either are ineffective or make a potassium fire worse. Nitrogen, argon, sodium chloride (table salt), sodium carbonate (soda ash), and silicon dioxide (sand) are effective if they are dry. Some Class D dry powder extinguishers designed for metal fires are also effective. These agents deprive the fire of oxygen and cool the potassium metal.

During storage, potassium forms peroxides and superoxides. These peroxides may react violently with organic compounds such as oils. Both peroxides and superoxides may react explosively with metallic potassium.

Because potassium reacts with water vapor in the air, it is usually stored under anhydrous mineral oil or kerosene. Unlike lithium and sodium, potassium should not be stored under oil for longer than six months, unless in an inert (oxygen-free) atmosphere, or under vacuum. After prolonged storage in air dangerous shock-sensitive peroxides can form on the metal and under the lid of the container, and can detonate upon opening.

Ingestion of large amounts of potassium compounds, certain drugs, and homeostatic failure, can lead to hyperkalemia, leading to a variety of brady- and tachy-arrhythmias that can be fatal. Potassium chloride is used in the U.S. for lethal injection executions.

== Bibliography ==
- Greenwood NN, Earnshaw A (1997). Chemistry of the Elements (2nd ed.). Butterworth-Heinemann. ISBN 978-0-08-037941-8.
- Holleman AF, Wiberg E, Wiberg N (2007). "Potassium". Lehrbuch der Anorganischen Chemie (in German) (91–100 ed.). Walter de Gruyter. ISBN 978-3-11-017770-1.
- Schultz H, Bauer G, Schachl E, Hagedorn F, Schmittinger P (2006). "Potassium compounds". Ullmann's Encyclopedia of Industrial Chemistry. Vol. A22. pp. 39–103. doi:10.1002/14356007.a22_031.pub2. ISBN 978-3-527-30673-2.
- National Nutrient Database at USDA Website
