= Gravimetric analysis =

Quantitative determination of a chemical species based on its mass

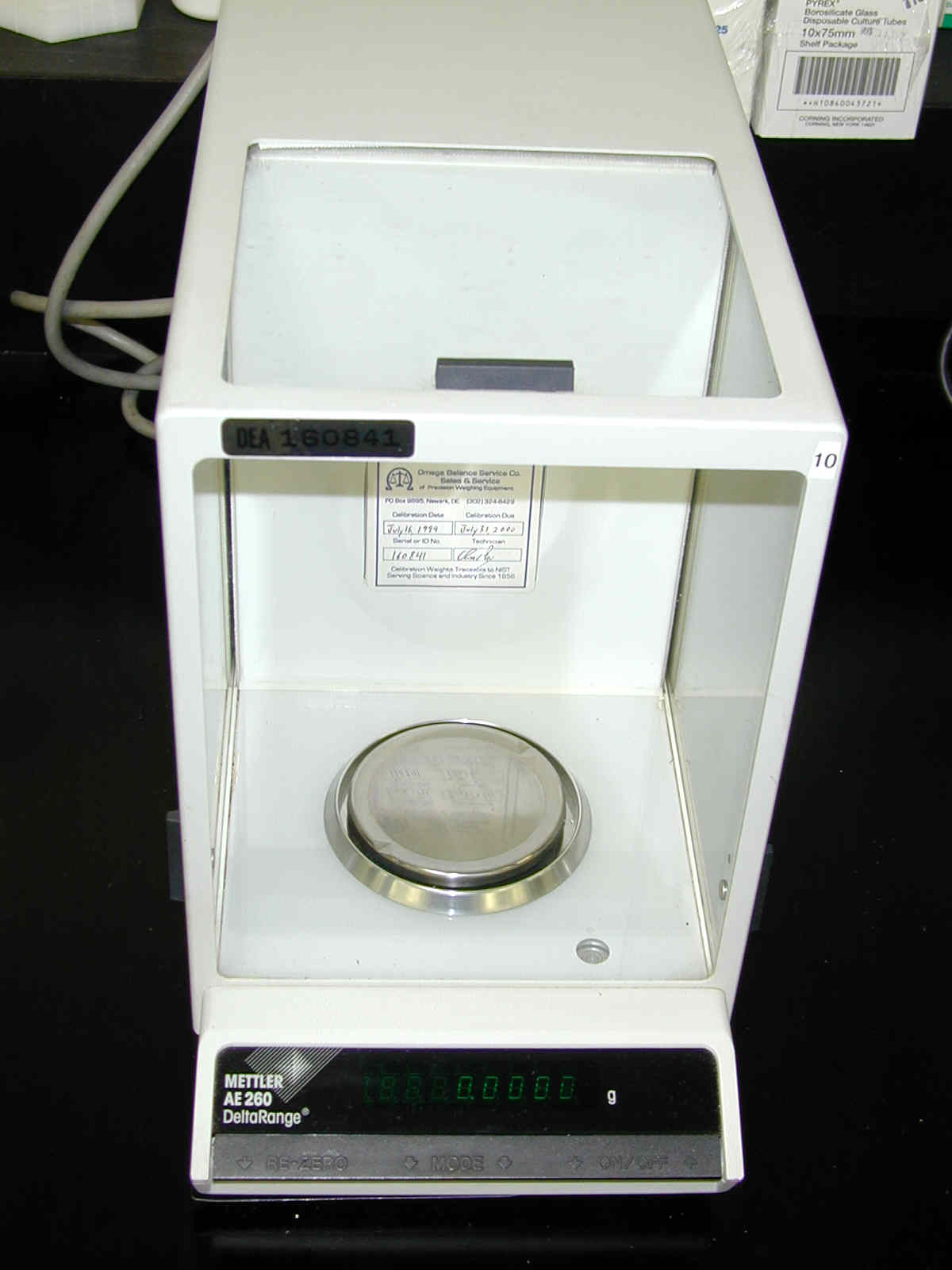
- Analytical balance
- Classification: Gravimetric
- Analytes: Solids; Liquids

Other techniques
- Related: Precipitation; Titration

Gravimetric analysis describes a set of methods used in analytical chemistry for the quantitative determination of an analyte (the ion being analyzed) based on its mass. The principle of this type of analysis is that once an ion's mass has been determined as a unique compound, that known measurement can then be used to determine the same analyte's mass in a mixture, as long as the relative quantities of the other constituents are known.

The four main types of this method of analysis are precipitation, volatilization, electro-analytical, and miscellaneous physical method. The methods involve changing the phase of the analyte to separate it in its pure form from the original mixture and are quantitative measurements.

Gravimetric analysis provides for exceedingly precise analysis. In fact, gravimetric analysis was used to determine the atomic masses of many elements in the periodic table to six figure accuracy. Gravimetry provides very little room for instrument error and does not require a series of standards for calculation of an unknown. Also, gravimetric methods often do not require expensive equipment. Due to its high degree of accuracy, gravimetric analysis can also be used to calibrate other instruments instead of using reference standards.

To some extent, gravimetric analysis has been displaced by spectroscopic methods, which are faster, highly specific, and entail less intervention. For example, silver ions can be quantified by precipitiation of silver chloride, but this approach is now archaic.

== Precipitation method ==
=== Principles ===
General qualities for precipitation reagents:

- precipitate is nonhygroscopic such that its weight is independent of humidity.
- product has a high molecular weight, to facilitate measurements of small quantities of the analyte.
- precipitation is selective for the ion of interest.

In terms of disadvantages, gravimetric analysis usually only provides for the analysis of one of a few elements. Methods can be convoluted. Challenges to precipitations are related to impurities in the solid, which can be caused by occlusions or surface adsorption of other ions. Some problems can be averted using homogeneous precipitation, which is the formation of the precipitate from a single homogeneous solution, as in the case of barium sulfate. The insolubility of precipitates can be affected by other ions in the solution. The solubility of silver chloride (AgCl; K_{sp} = 1.0 × 10^{−10} in 0.1 M NaNO_{3}) can increase by many orders of magnitude in the presence of other anions.

=== Case studies ===
==== Potassium ====
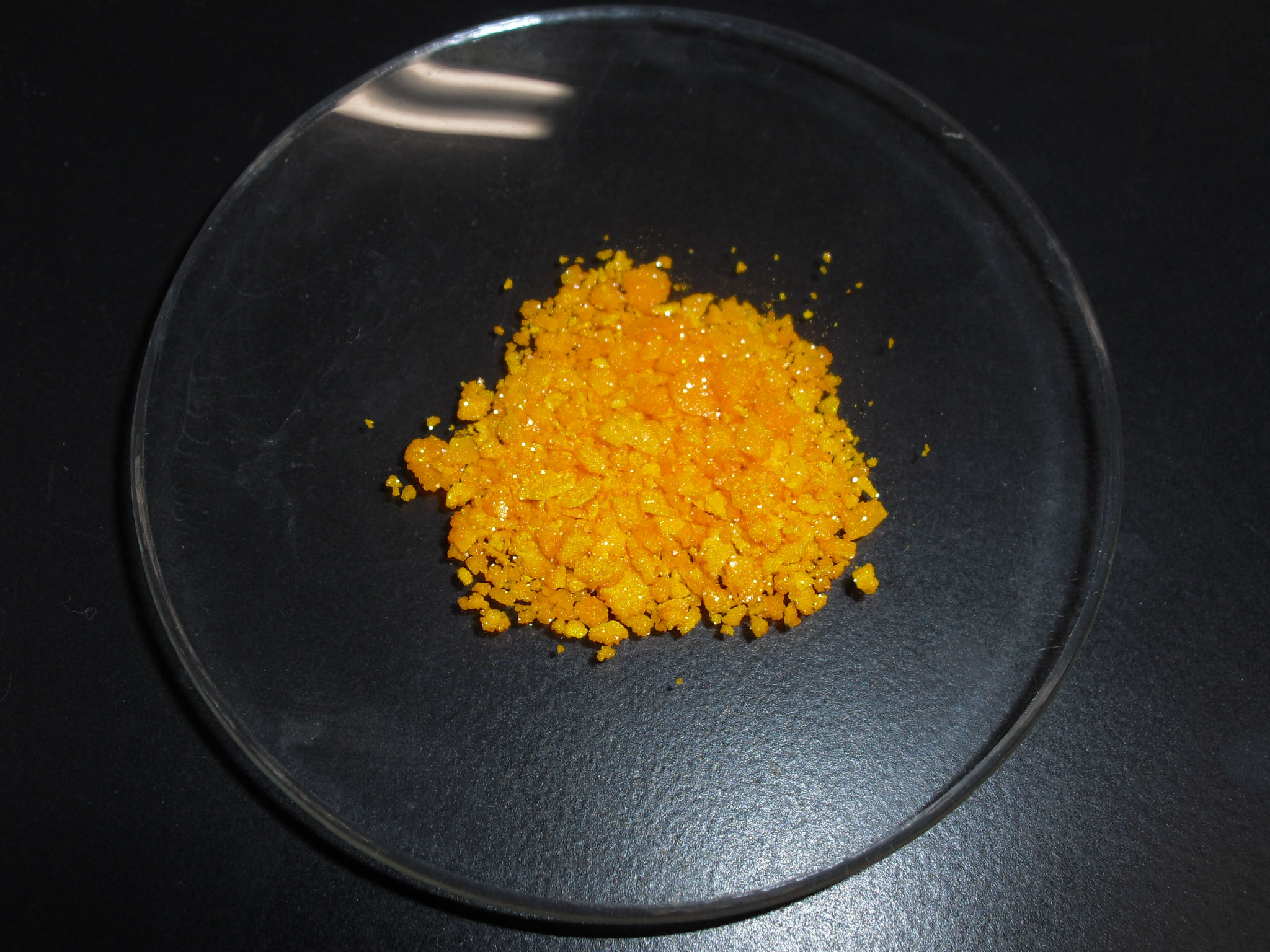
Potassium hexachloroplatinate, the result of gravimetric analysis for potassium

Potassium (K) can be quantified using hexachloroplatinic acid as the precipitating agent. Treatment of a solution containing K^{+} ions with an excess of this chloroplatinic acid quantitatively affords of potassium hexachloroplatinate, which is easily weighed and is non-hygroscopic:

2 K^{+} + H_{2}[PtCl_{6}] → K_{2}[PtCl_{6}] + 2 H^{+}

A similar analytical procedure yields a precipitate of potassium tetraphenylborate from sodium tetraphenylborate.

==== Phosphate ====
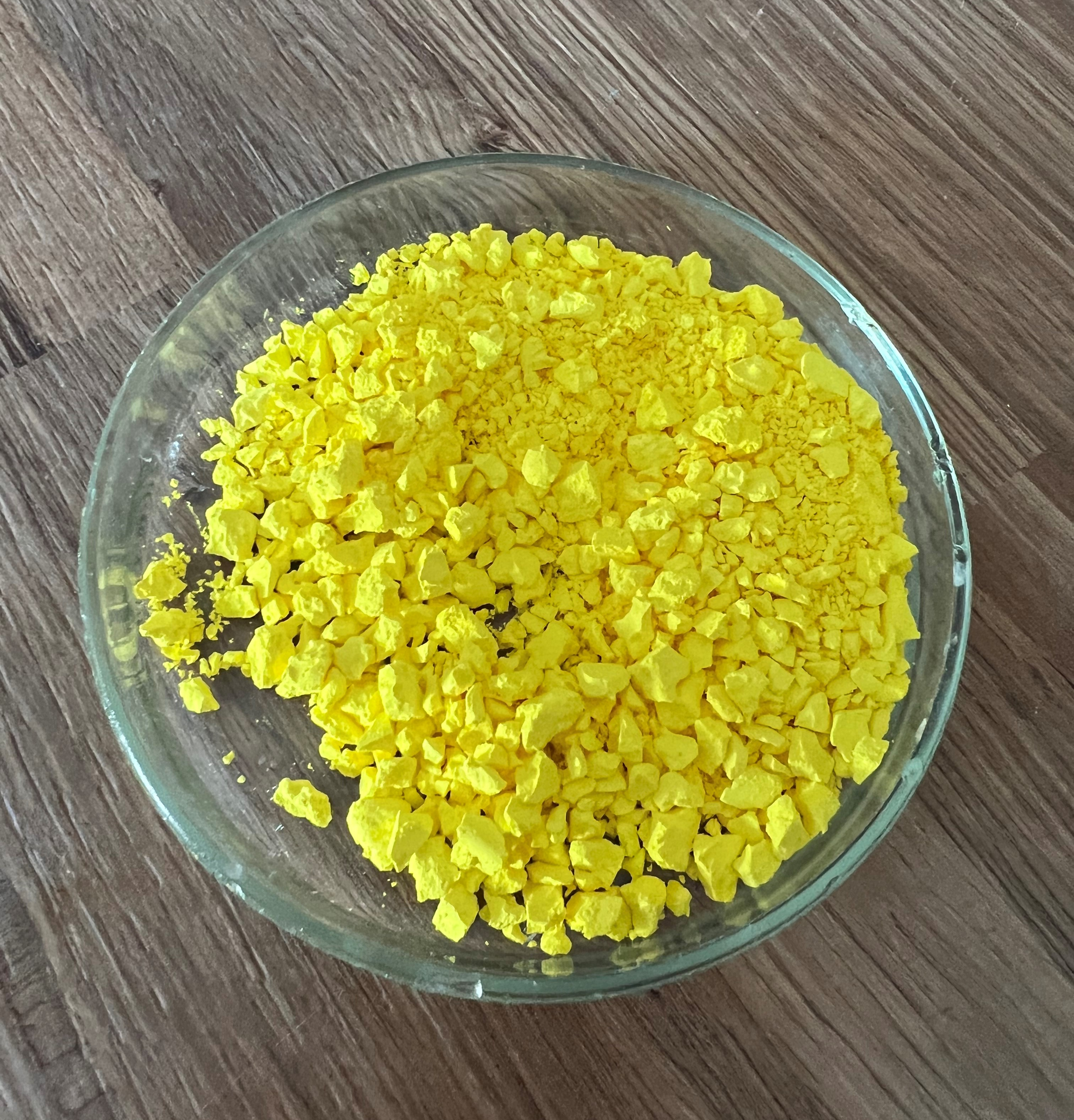
Ammonium 12-molybdophosphate, the result of gravimetric analysis for phosphate

Addition of aqueous solution of ammonium molybdate to a solution containing hydrogen phosphate gives a precipitate of ammonium phosphomolybdate.

==== Complexation: nickel, aluminium ====
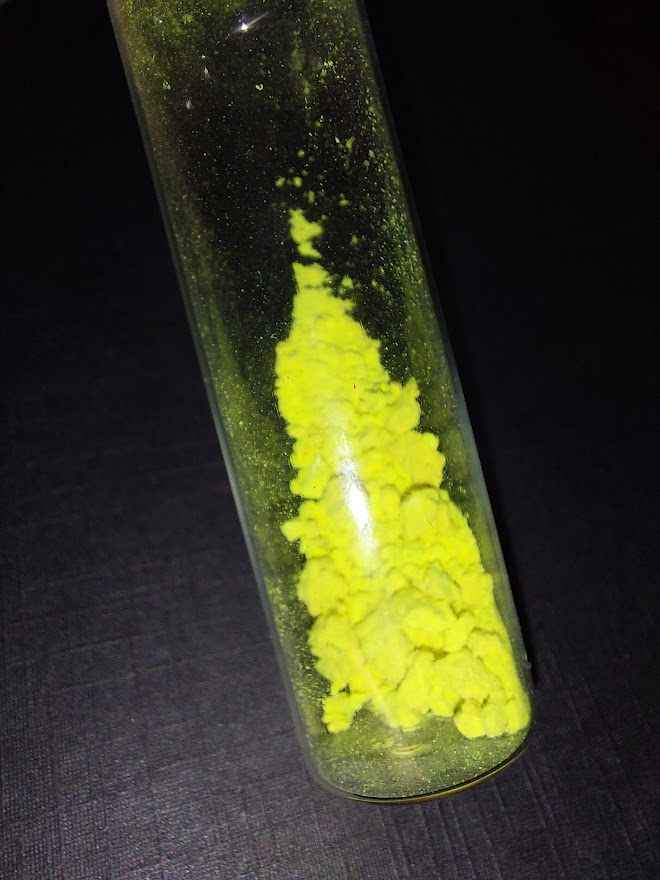
Tris(8-hydroxyquinolinato)aluminium, the result of a gravimetric analysis for aluminium.

Several applications of gravimetric analysis employ organic ligands that generate precipitates with a specific metal ion. A solution of nickel ions is treated with a > 2 equivalents of dimethylglyoxime to give a bright red precipitate of nickel bis(dimethylglyoximate). In a similar approach, a solution of aluminium ions is treated with 8-hydroxyquinoline to give aluminium tris(8-Hydroxyquinolinate).

==== Barium ====
Barium sulfate is highly insoluble in water. Using homogeneous precipitation, a sample solution containing barium ions is treated with an excess of sulfamic acid. This solution is heated to induce hydrolysis of sulfamic acid to bisulfate:

2 H_{2}NSO_{3}H + 2 H_{2}O → 2 NH^{+}_{4} + 2 HSO^{−}_{4}

The bisulfate readily reacts with barium ions to give the sulfate:

2 HSO^{−}_{4} + Ba^{2+} → BaSO_{4} + 2 H^{+}

== Volatilization methods ==
=== Calcium ===
To determine the amount of calcium in water, excess of oxalic acid will precipitate calcium oxalate according to the following equation:

Ca^{2+}(aq) + C_{2}O_{4}^{2-} → CaC_{2}O_{4}

The precipitate when ignited at high (red) heat in air converts to calcium oxide:

CaC_{2}O_{4} → CaO(s) + CO(g)+ CO_{2}(g)

The precipitate is weighed, and the difference in weights before and after reveals the mass of analyte lost, in this case calcium oxide. That number can then be used to calculate the amount, or the percent concentration, of calcium oxide analyte in the original mix.

=== Types of volatilization methods ===
In volatilization methods, removal of the analyte involves separation by heating or chemically decomposing a volatile sample at a suitable temperature. In other words, thermal or chemical energy is used to precipitate a volatile species. For example, the water content of a compound can be determined by vaporizing the water using thermal energy (heat). Heat can also be used, if oxygen is present, for combustion to isolate the suspect species and obtain the desired results.

The two most common gravimetric methods using volatilization are those for water and carbon dioxide. An example of this method is the isolation of sodium bicarbonate (the main ingredient in most antacid tablets) from a mixture of carbonate and bicarbonate. The total amount of this analyte, in whatever form, is obtained by addition of an excess of dilute sulfuric acid to the analyte in solution.

In this reaction, nitrogen gas is introduced through a tube into the flask which contains the solution. As it passes through, it gently bubbles. The gas then exits, first passing a drying agent (here CaSO_{4}, the common desiccant Drierite). It then passes a mixture of the drying agent and sodium hydroxide which lies on asbestos or Ascarite II, a non-fibrous silicate containing sodium hydroxide. The mass of the carbon dioxide is obtained by measuring the increase in mass of this absorbent. This is performed by measuring the difference in weight of the tube in which the asbestos contained before and after the procedure.

The calcium sulfate (CaSO_{4}) in the tube retains carbon dioxide selectively as it's heated, and thereby, removed from the solution. The drying agent absorbs any aerosolized water and/or water vapor (reaction 3). The mix of the drying agent and NaOH absorbs the CO_{2} and any water that may have been produced as a result of the absorption of the NaOH (reaction 4).

The reactions are:

Reaction 3. Absorption of water

NaHCO_{3}(aq) + H_{2}SO_{4}(aq) → CO_{2}(g) + H_{2}O(l) + NaHSO_{4}(aq)

Reaction 4. Absorption of CO_{2} and residual water

CO_{2}(g) + 2 NaOH(s) → Na_{2}CO_{3}(s) + H_{2}O(l)

== See also ==
- Titration
