= Schlosser's base =

Schlosser's base (or Lochmann-Schlosser base) describes various superbasic mixtures of an alkyllithium compound and a potassium alkoxide. The reagent is named after Manfred Schlosser, although he uses the term LICKOR superbase (LIC denoting the alkyllithium, and KOR denoting the potassium alkoxide). The superbasic nature of the reagent is a consequence of the in situ formation of the corresponding organopotassium compound, as well as changes to the aggregation state of the alkyllithium species.

== Preparation and reactivity ==
Commonly, the mixture called Schlosser's base is produced by combining n-butyllithium and potassium tert-butoxide in a one-to-one ratio.

The high reactivity of Schlosser's base is exploited in synthetic organic chemistry for the preparation of organometallic reagents. For example, potassium benzyl can be prepared from toluene using this reagent. Benzene and cis/trans-2-butene are also readily metalated by Schlosser's base. Toluene, benzene, and butenes react only slowly with alkyllithium reagents and not at all with potassium alkoxides, yet they react rapidly with a mixture of the two. Although there are similarities, the reactivities of Schlosser's base and the isolated alkylpotassium reagent are not identical.

== Structure ==
The structure of Schlosser's base is complex. A study of the base prepared from neopentyllithium (neo-C_{5}H_{11}Li) and potassium t-butoxide (t-BuOK) has led to the spectroscopic and crystallographic identification of a series of constituent bimetallic clusters:

Li_{x}K_{y}(neo-C_{5}H_{11})_{z}(t-BuO)_{w}, x + y = z + w = 7 or 8,

in equilibrium with neopentylpotassium (neo-C_{5}H_{11}K) and lithium t-butoxide (t-BuOLi).
