= Tetraphenylborate =

Ion

Names
- Preferred IUPAC name Tetraphenylboranuide
- Other names Tetraphenylborate(1−) (additive), tetraphenylboranuide

Identifiers
CAS Number	4358-26-3
3D model (JSmol)	Interactive image
ChEMBL	ChEMBL587884
ChemSpider	8592
MeSH	D013775
PubChem CID	8934
UNII	8TYC18K6NX
CompTox Dashboard (EPA)	DTXSID801336454
- InChI: InChI=1S/C24H20B/c1-5-13-21(14-6-1)25(22-15-7-2-8-16-22,23-17-9-3-10-18-23)24-19-11-4-12-20-24/h1-20H/q-1 Key: SVHQOIWIRUVWII-UHFFFAOYSA-N
- SMILES: [B-](c1ccccc1)(c2ccccc2)(c3ccccc3)c4ccccc4

Properties
Chemical formula	C_{24}H_{20}B
Molar mass	319.23 g·mol^{−1}
- Except where otherwise noted, data are given for materials in their standard state (at 25 °C [77 °F], 100 kPa). verify (what is ?) Infobox references

Tetraphenylborate is an organoboron anion consisting of a central boron atom with four phenyl groups. It is a colorless anion that forms water-insoluble salts with a variety of cations. It was considered as a precipitant for caesium-137 ions in the context of radioactive waste cleanup.

Salts of tetraphenylborate have been used as uncouplers of oxidative phosphorylation.

Oxidation of tetraphenylborate gives biphenyl and (C_{6}H_{5})_{2}BOH.

== See also ==
- Sodium tetraphenylborate
- Potassium tetraphenylborate
- Triphenylborane
- BARF and other fluorinated derivatives are used as non-coordinating anions
