= Nikolaus Wolfgang Fischer =

German physician and chemist (1782–1850)

- Born: 15 January 1782; Groß-Meseritsch, Margraviate of Moravia
- Died: 19 August 1850 (aged 68); Breslau, Province of Silesia, Kingdom of Prussia
- Education: University of Erfurt (MD)
- Known for: Synthesizing potassium cobaltinitrite
- Scientific career
- Fields: Chemistry, medicine
- Workplaces: University of Breslau
- Notable students: Gotthold Eisenstein

Nikolaus Wolfgang Fischer (15 January 1782 – 19 August 1850) was a German Jewish chemist. He first synthesized the potassium cobaltinitrite, later used as aureolin pigment.

Fischer was raised in a Jewish family. He was reported to have practiced medicine in Erfurt and studied at the University of Vienna, Charles University, University of Breslau, and the Humboldt University of Berlin.

In 1813, he became an assistant professor at the University of Breslau, and then became a professor and worked as the chemistry department's first chair. He held this position until his death.

In 1815, Fischer converted to Christianity and was an ardent supporter of evangelizing.

== Career ==
Fischer published about sixty works in German journals. He reported on the triple salt K3 Co(NO2)6, also known as "Fischer's salt" and used it to separate nickel from cobalt. Fischer also observed the semipermeability of animal bladders in solutions, which he wrote about in "Über die Eigenschaft der thierischen Blase, Flüssigkeiten durch sich hindurch zu lassen." He also took great interest in electrochemical phenomena.

Some of his works include articles in:

- Journal für Chemie und Physik
- Schweigger's Annalen für Chemie
- Abhandlungen der Akademie der Wissenschaften in Berlin
- Annalen der Physik und Chemie
- Medicaminum Mercurialium Præcipua Classificatio
- Adjectis Nonnullis de Eorum Præparatione Chem. -Pharmac. Annotationibus, 1806
- De Modis Arsenia Detegendi, 1812
- Ueber die Wirkung des Lichts auf das Hornsilber, 1814
- Ueber die Chemischen Reagentien, 1816
- Chemische Untersuchungen der Heilquellen zu Salzbrunn, 1821
- Ueber die Natur der Metallreduction auf Nassem Wege, 1828
- Das Verhältniss der Chemischen Verwandtschaft zur Galvanischen Elektricität, in Versuchen Dargestellt, 1830
- Systematischer Lehrbegriff der Chemie, in Tabellen Dargestellt, 1838
