= Potassium tetraphenylborate =

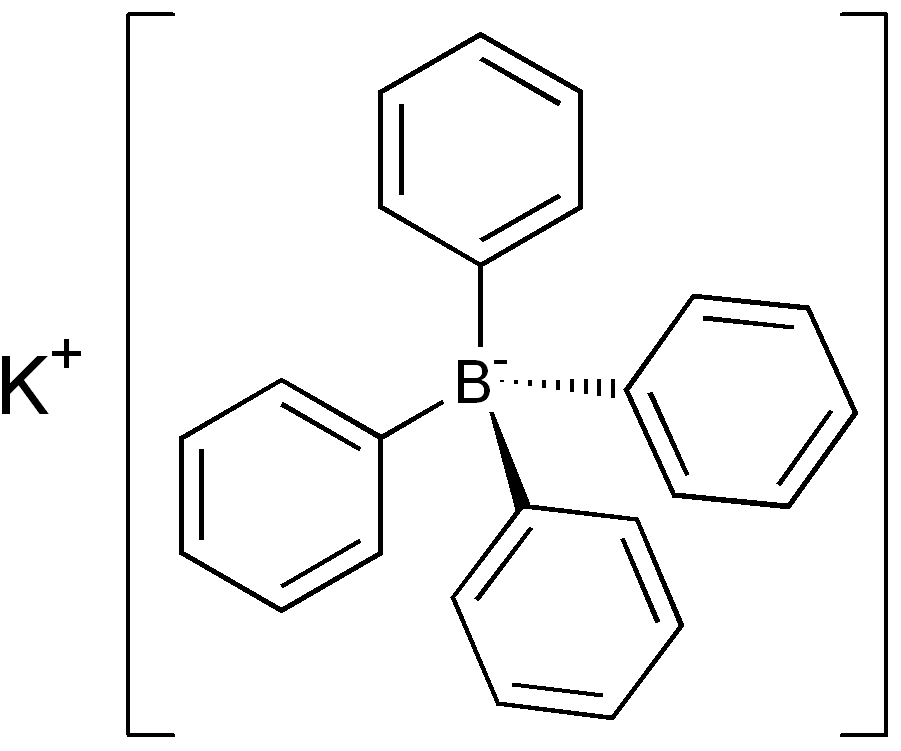

Names
- Preferred IUPAC name Potassium tetraphenylboranuide

Identifiers
CAS Number	3244-41-5
3D model (JSmol)	Interactive image
ChemSpider	4937589
ECHA InfoCard	100.156.375
PubChem CID	6432333
CompTox Dashboard (EPA)	DTXSID70635409
- InChI: InChI=1S/C24H20B.K/c1-5-13-21(14-6-1)25(22-15-7-2-8-16-22,23-17-9-3-10-18-23)24-19-11-4-12-20-24;/h1-20H;/q-1;+1 Key: MAMCUZQNCMYPCY-UHFFFAOYSA-N; InChI=1/C24H20B.K/c1-5-13-21(14-6-1)25(22-15-7-2-8-16-22,23-17-9-3-10-18-23)24-19-11-4-12-20-24;/h1-20H;/q-1;+1 Key: MAMCUZQNCMYPCY-UHFFFAOYAU
- SMILES: [K+].c1c(cccc1)[B-](c2ccccc2)(c3ccccc3)c4ccccc4

Properties
Chemical formula	C_{24}H_{20}BK
Molar mass	358.3249
- Except where otherwise noted, data are given for materials in their standard state (at 25 °C [77 °F], 100 kPa). verify (what is ?) Infobox references

Potassium tetraphenylborate is the salt with the formula KB(C_{6}H_{5})_{4}). It is a colourless salt that is a rare example of a water-insoluble salt of potassium.

The salt has a low solubility in water of only 1.8×10^{−4} g/L. It is, however, soluble in organic solvents. The insolubility of this compound has been used to determine the concentration of potassium ions by precipitation and gravimetric analysis:

K^{+} + NaB(Ph)_{4} → KB(Ph)_{4} + Na^{+}

The compound adopts a polymeric structure with bonds between the phenyl rings and potassium. As such it is classified as an organopotassium compound.
