= Potassium hexanitritocobaltate(III) =

Potassium cobaltinitrite

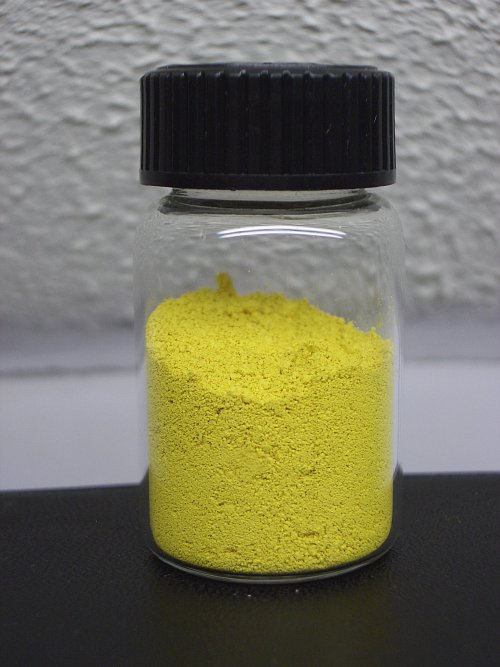

Names
- IUPAC name Potassium hexanitritocobaltate(III)
- Other names Potassium cobaltinitrite

Identifiers
CAS Number	13782-01-9
3D model (JSmol)	Interactive image; hydrate: Interactive image; sequihydrate: Interactive image
ECHA InfoCard	100.034.018
EC Number	237-435-2
PubChem CID	25022080
UNII	40W79B48SV
CompTox Dashboard (EPA)	DTXSID60929905
- InChI: hydrate: InChI=1S/Co.3K.6HNO2.H2O/c;;;;6*2-1-3;/h;;;;6*(H,2,3);1H2/q+3;3*+1;;;;;;;/p-6 Key: WLPLGDPHTBMXEF-UHFFFAOYSA-H; sequihydrate: InChI=1S/2Co.6K.12HNO2.3H2O/c;;;;;;;;12*2-1-3;;;/h;;;;;;;;12*(H,2,3);3*1H2/q;;6*+1;;;;;;;;;;;;;;;/p-12 Key: CEXZUHDLUIMTHB-UHFFFAOYSA-B
- SMILES: N(=O)[O-].N(=O)[O-].N(=O)[O-].N(=O)[O-].N(=O)[O-].N(=O)[O-].[K+].[K+].[K+].[Co]; hydrate: N(=O)[O-].N(=O)[O-].N(=O)[O-].N(=O)[O-].N(=O)[O-].N(=O)[O-].O.[K+].[K+].[K+].[Co+3]; sequihydrate: N(=O)[O-].N(=O)[O-].N(=O)[O-].N(=O)[O-].N(=O)[O-].N(=O)[O-].[K+].[K+].[K+].[Co].N(=O)[O-].N(=O)[O-].N(=O)[O-].N(=O)[O-].N(=O)[O-].N(=O)[O-].[K+].[K+].[K+].[Co].O.O.O

Properties
Chemical formula	K_{3}[Co(NO_{2})_{6}] (anhydrous); K_{3}[Co(NO_{2})_{6}]·1.5H_{2}O (sesquihydrate)
Molar mass	452.26 g/mol (anhydrous); 479.284 g/mol (sesquihydrate)
Appearance	yellow cubic crystals (sesquihydrate)
Density	2.6 g/cm^{3} (sesquihydrate)
Solubility in water	slightly soluble in water (sesquihydrate)
Solubility	reacts with acids, insoluble in ethanol (sesquihydrate)
- Except where otherwise noted, data are given for materials in their standard state (at 25 °C [77 °F], 100 kPa). verify (what is ?) Infobox references

Potassium hexanitritocobaltate(III) is a salt with the formula K_{3}[Co(NO_{2})_{6}]. It is a yellow solid that is poorly soluble in water. The compound finds some use as a yellow pigment under the name Indian Yellow.

The salt features potassium cations and an trianionic coordination complex. In the anion, cobalt is bound by six nitrito ligands, the overall complex having octahedral molecular geometry. The oxidation state of cobalt is 3+. Its low-spin d^{6} configuration confers kinetic stability and diamagnetism. The compound is prepared by combining cobalt(II) and nitrite salts in the presence of oxygen. The corresponding sodium cobaltinitrite is significantly more soluble in water.

The compound was first described in 1848 by Nikolaus Wolfgang Fischer in Breslau, and it is used as a yellow pigment called Aureolin.

== See also ==
- Sodium hexanitritocobaltate(III)
