= Benzyl potassium =

Names
- Other names Potassium benzyl

Identifiers
CAS Number	2785-29-7
3D model (JSmol)	Interactive image
ChemSpider	10675000
PubChem CID	11083915
CompTox Dashboard (EPA)	DTXSID00454524
- InChI: InChI=1S/C7H7.K/c1-7-5-3-2-4-6-7;/h2-6H,1H2; Key: OQLLVOGBAKFMIS-UHFFFAOYSA-N; InChI=1/C7H7.K/c1-7-5-3-2-4-6-7;/h2-6H,1H2;/rC7H7K/c8-6-7-4-2-1-3-5-7/h1-5H,6H2 Key: OQLLVOGBAKFMIS-QPGMTJJQAI
- SMILES: [K]Cc1ccccc1

Properties
Chemical formula	C_{7}H_{7}K
Molar mass	130.231 g·mol^{−1}
Appearance	Orange solid

Hazards
- Occupational safety and health (OHS/OSH)
Main hazards	Ignites in air
- Except where otherwise noted, data are given for materials in their standard state (at 25 °C [77 °F], 100 kPa). Infobox references

Benzylpotassium is an organopotassium compound with the formula C_{6}H_{5}CH_{2}K, an orange powder. Like organo-alkali metal reagents in general, benzyl potassium is highly reactive, so much so that it reacts with most solvents. It is highly air sensitive.

== Synthesis ==
One early synthesis proceeds by two-step transmetallation reaction by p-tolylpotassium:

(CH_{3}C_{6}H_{4})_{2}Hg + 2 K → 2 CH_{3}C_{6}H_{4}K + Hg
CH_{3}C_{6}H_{4}K → KCH_{2}C_{6}H_{5}

A modern synthesis involves the reaction of butyllithium, potassium tert-butoxide, and toluene.

The structure of the related diphenylmethane derivative has been confirmed by X-ray crystallography.
