= Aureolin =

Yellow pigment used in painting

Color coordinates
- Hex triplet: #FDEE00
- sRGB^{B} (r, g, b): (253, 238, 0)
- HSV (h, s, v): (56°, 100%, 99%)
- CIELCh_{uv} (L, C, h): (93, 102, 80°)
- Source: HTML Color Codes
- ISCC–NBS descriptor: Vivid greenish yellow
- B: Normalized to [0–255] (byte)

Aureolin (sometimes called cobalt yellow) is a pigment sparingly used in oil and watercolor painting. Its color index name is PY40 (40th entry on list of yellow pigments). It was first made in 1831 by Nikolaus Wolfgang Fischer in Breslau characterizing it as "Doppelsalze" or double-salts and its chemical composition is potassium cobaltinitrite. He characterized it again and wrote more extensively about it in 1842, naming it "Salpetrichtsaures Kobaltoxydkali". In 1851–1852, Edouard Saint-Evre synthesized cobalt yellow independently. He is credited with the introduction of cobalt yellow as an artists pigment. The investigation by Gates gives the exact modern procedures for the preparation of aureolin and also the methods for its identification in paintings.

Aureolin is rated as permanent in some reports but there are other sources which rate it as unstable in oils but pronounce it stable in watercolors. Others find it unstable in watercolors, fading to greyish or brownish hues. It is a transparent, lightly staining, light valued, intense medium yellow pigment.

It is a rather expensive pigment and sold by several manufacturers of oil paints such as Grumbacher, Michael Harding, and Holbein. However, the pigment was never popular as an oil color and is much more widely available as a watercolor from manufacturers such as: Winsor & Newton, Talens Rembrandt, Rowney Artists, Sennelier, Art Spectrum and Daniel Smith.

== See also ==
- List of colors
- List of inorganic pigments
