= Sodium tetraphenylborate =

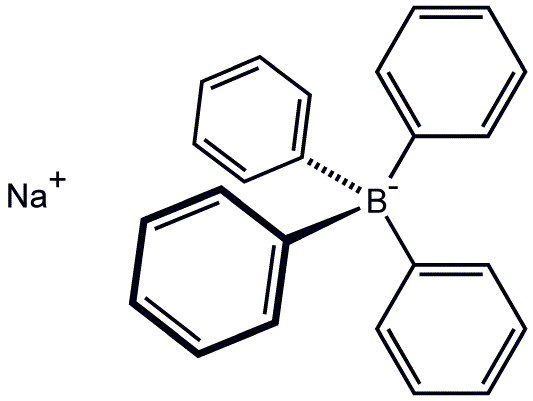

Names
- Preferred IUPAC name Sodium tetraphenylboranuide
- Other names Tetraphenylboron sodium Kalignost

Identifiers
CAS Number	143-66-8
3D model (JSmol)	Interactive image
ChemSpider	8591
ECHA InfoCard	100.005.096
EC Number	205-605-5
PubChem CID	2723787
UNII	5A96KL5H1M
CompTox Dashboard (EPA)	DTXSID2059728
- InChI: InChI=1S/C24H20B.Na/c1-5-13-21(14-6-1)25(22-15-7-2-8-16-22,23-17-9-3-10-18-23)24-19-11-4-12-20-24;/h1-20H;/q-1;+1 Key: HFSRCEJMTLMDLI-UHFFFAOYSA-N
- SMILES: [B-](C1=CC=CC=C1)(C2=CC=CC=C2)(C3=CC=CC=C3)C4=CC=CC=C4.[Na+]

Properties
Chemical formula	(C_{6}H_{5})_{4}BNa
Molar mass	342.216 g/mol
Appearance	white solid
Melting point	> 310 °C (590 °F; 583 K)
Solubility in water	47 g/100 mL
Solubility	soluble in ethanol
- Except where otherwise noted, data are given for materials in their standard state (at 25 °C [77 °F], 100 kPa). verify (what is ?) Infobox references

Sodium tetraphenylborate is the organic compound with the formula NaB(C_{6}H_{5})_{4}. It is a salt, wherein the anion consists of four phenyl rings bonded to boron. This white crystalline solid is used to prepare other tetraphenylborate salts, which are often highly soluble in organic solvents. The compound is used in inorganic and organometallic chemistry as a precipitating agent for potassium, ammonium, rubidium, and caesium ions, and some organic nitrogen compounds.

== Synthesis and structure ==
Sodium tetraphenylborate is synthesized by the reaction between sodium tetrafluoroborate and phenylmagnesium bromide:

NaBF_{4} + 4 PhMgBr → 2 MgBr_{2} + 2 MgF_{2} + NaBPh_{4} (where Ph = phenyl)

A related synthesis involves the use of phenylsodium in place of the Grignard reagent.

Unlike smaller counteranions, such as nitrate and the halides, tetraphenylborate confers lipophilicity to its salts. Many analogous tetraarylborates have been synthesized, containing both electron-rich and electron-deficient aryl groups.

The anhydrous salt adopts a polymeric structure in the solid state consisting of Na^{+}-phenyl interactions. As such the salt could be classified as an organosodium compound.

== Use in chemical synthesis ==
=== Preparation of N-acylammonium salts ===
Addition of sodium tetraphenylborate to a solution of a tertiary amine and an acid chloride in acetonitrile gives the acylonium salt by precipitating NaCl from the reaction mixture. This method has a broad scope:

RC(O)Cl + R'_{3}N + NaB(C_{6}H_{5})_{4} → [RC(O)NR'_{3}][B(C_{6}H_{5})_{4}] + NaCl

Sodium tetraphenylborate is also employed as a phenyl donor in palladium-catalyzed cross-coupling reactions involving vinyl and aryl triflates to give arylalkenes and biaryl compounds in good yields and under mild conditions, respectively.

=== Use in coordination chemistry ===
Tetraphenylborates are often studied in organometallic chemistry because of their good solubility in nonpolar solvents and their crystallinity. For example, the homoleptic trimethylphosphite complexes {M[P(OCH_{3})_{3}]_{5}}^{2+} (Ni, Pd, and Pt) have been prepared as their tetraphenylborate salts. Similarly, sodium tetraphenylborate has been used to isolate complexes containing dinitrogen ligands. In the reaction below, sodium tetraphenylborate allows N_{2} to displace the chloride ligand, which is removed from solution as a precipitate of sodium chloride:

FeHCl(diphosphine)_{2} + NaB(C_{6}H_{5})_{4} + N_{2} → [FeH(N_{2})(diphosphine)_{2}]B(C_{6}H_{5})_{4} + NaCl

The use of tetraphenylborate is limited to non-acidic cations. With strong acids, the anion undergoes protonolysis to give triphenylborane and benzene:

H^{+} + B(C_{6}H_{5})_{4}^{−} → B(C_{6}H_{5})_{3} + C_{6}H_{6}

== Related tetraorganoborates ==
Weakly coordinating anions often are based on tetraarylborates, with electronegative substituents. Examples include B(C_{6}F_{5})_{4}^{−} and Brookhart's acid containing the tetrakis[3,5-bis(trifluoromethyl)phenyl]borate anion.
