= Organosodium chemistry =

Study of chemical compounds containing carbon-sodium bonds

Organosodium chemistry is the chemistry of organometallic compounds containing a carbon to sodium chemical bond. The application of organosodium compounds in chemistry is limited in part due to competition from organolithium compounds, which are commercially available and exhibit more convenient reactivity.

The principal organosodium compound of commercial importance is sodium cyclopentadienide. Sodium tetraphenylborate can also be classified as an organosodium compound since in the solid state sodium is bound to the aryl groups.

Organometal bonds in group 1 are characterised by high polarity with corresponding high nucleophilicity on carbon. This polarity results from the disparate electronegativity of carbon (2.55) and that of lithium 0.98, sodium 0.93 potassium 0.82 rubidium 0.82 caesium 0.79). The carbanionic nature of organosodium compounds can be minimized by resonance stabilization, for example, Ph_{3}CNa. One consequence of the highly polarized Na-C bond is that simple organosodium compounds often exist as polymers that are poorly soluble in solvents.

== Synthesis ==
=== Transmetallation routes ===
In the original work the alkylsodium compound was accessed from the dialkylmercury compound by transmetallation. For example, diethylmercury in the Schorigin reaction or Shorygin reaction:

(C_{2}H_{5})_{2}Hg + 2 Na → 2 C_{2}H_{5}Na + Hg

The high solubility of lithium alkoxides in hexane is the basis of a useful synthetic route:

LiCH_{2}SiMe_{3} + NaO–t–Bu → LiOt–Bu + NaCH_{2}SiMe_{3}

=== Deprotonation routes ===
For some acidic organic compounds, the corresponding organosodium compounds arise by deprotonation. Sodium cyclopentadienide is thus prepared by treating sodium metal and cyclopentadiene:

2 Na+ 2 C_{5}H_{6} → 2 Na^{+} C_{5}H_{5}^{−} + H_{2}

Sodium acetylides form similarly. Often strong sodium bases are employed in place of the metal. Sodium methylsulfinylmethylide is prepared by treating DMSO with sodium hydride:

CH_{3}SOCH_{3} + NaH → CH_{3}SOCH^{−}_{2}Na^{+} + H_{2}

=== Metal-halogen exchange ===
Trityl sodium can be prepared by sodium-halogen exchange:

Ph_{3}CCl + 2 Na → Ph_{3}C^{−} Na^{+} + NaCl

=== Electron transfer ===
Sodium also reacts with polycyclic aromatic hydrocarbons via one-electron reduction. With solutions of naphthalene, it forms the deeply coloured radical sodium naphthalene, which is used as a soluble reducing agent:

C_{10}H_{8} + Na → Na^{+}[C_{10}H_{8}]^{−•}

Structural studies show however that sodium naphthalene has no Na-C bond, the sodium is invariably coordinated by ether or amine ligands. The related anthracene as well as lithium derivatives are well known.

== Structures ==
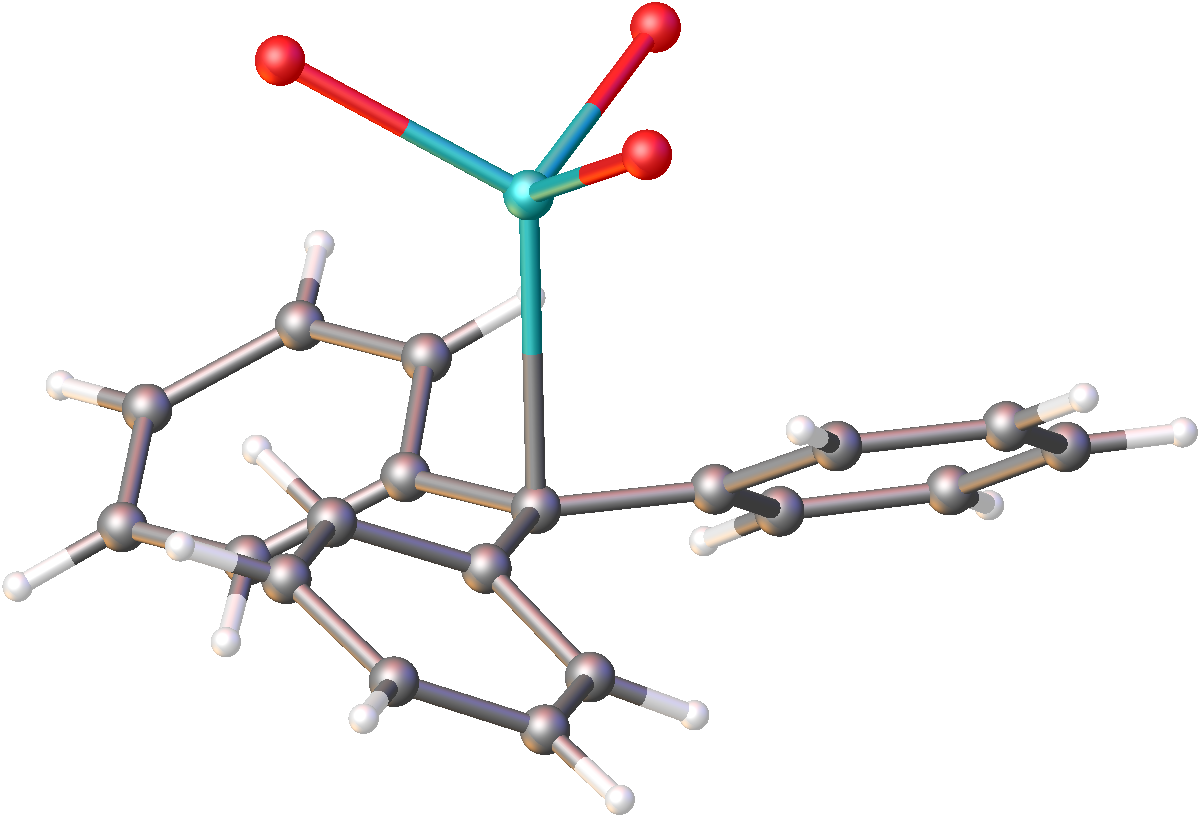
Structure of (C_{6}H_{5})_{3}CNa(thf)_{3} ("trityl sodium"), omitting all but the oxygen of the thf ligands. Selected distances: r_{Na-C(central)}=256 pm, r_{Na-C(ipso)} = 298 pm (avg of three).

Simple organosodium compounds such as the alkyl and aryl derivatives are generally insoluble polymers. Because of its large radius, Na prefers a higher coordination number than does lithium in organolithium compounds. Methyl sodium adopts a polymeric structure consisting of interconnected [NaCH_{3}]_{4} clusters. When the organic substituents are bulky and especially in the presence of chelating ligands like TMEDA, the derivatives are more soluble. For example, [NaCH_{2}SiMe_{3}]TMEDA is soluble in hexane. Crystals have been shown to consist of chains of alternating Na(TMEDA)^{+} and CH_{2}SiMe^{−}_{3} groups with Na–C distances ranging from 2.523(9) to 2.643(9) Å.

Structure of the phenylsodium-PMDTA adduct, hydrogen atoms omitted for clarity.

== Reactions ==
Organosodium compounds are traditionally used as strong bases, although this application has been supplanted by other reagents such as sodium bis(trimethylsilyl)amide.

The higher alkali metals are known to metalate even some unactivated hydrocarbons and are known to self-metalate:

2 NaC_{2}H_{5} → C_{2}H_{4}Na_{2} + C_{2}H_{6}

In the Wanklyn reaction (1858) organosodium compounds react with carbon dioxide to give carboxylates:

C_{2}H_{5}Na + CO_{2} → C_{2}H_{5}CO_{2}Na

Grignard reagents undergo a similar reaction.

Some organosodium compounds degrade by beta-elimination:

NaC_{2}H_{5} → NaH + C_{2}H_{4}

== Industrial applications ==
Although organosodium chemistry has been described to be of "little industrial importance", it once was central to the production of tetraethyllead. A similar Wurtz coupling-like reaction is the basis of the industrial route to triphenylphosphine:

3 PhCl + PCl_{3} + 6 Na → PPh_{3} + 6 NaCl

The polymerization of butadiene and styrene is catalyzed by sodium metal.

== Organic derivatives of the heavier alkali metals ==
Organopotassium, organorubidium, and organocaesium compounds are less commonly encountered than organosodium compounds and are of limited utility. These compounds can be prepared by treatment of alkyl lithium compounds with the potassium, rubidium, and caesium alkoxides. Alternatively they arise from the organomercury compound, although this method is dated. The solid methyl derivatives adopt polymeric structures. Reminiscent of the nickel arsenide structure, MCH_{3} (M = K, Rb, Cs) has six alkali metal centers bound to each methyl group. The methyl groups are pyramidal, as expected.

A notable reagent that is based on a heavier alkali metal alkyl is Schlosser's base, a mixture of n-butyllithium and potassium tert-butoxide. This reagent reacts with toluene to form the red-orange compound benzyl potassium (KCH_{2}C_{6}H_{5}).

Evidence for the formation of heavy alkali metal-organic intermediates is provided by the equilibration of cis-but-2-ene and trans-but-2-ene catalysed by alkali metals. The isomerization is fast with lithium and sodium, but slow with the higher alkali metals. The higher alkali metals also favor the sterically congested conformation. Several crystal structures of organopotassium compounds have been reported, establishing that they, like the sodium compounds, are polymeric.

== See also ==
- Alkynation
