= Triphenylborane =

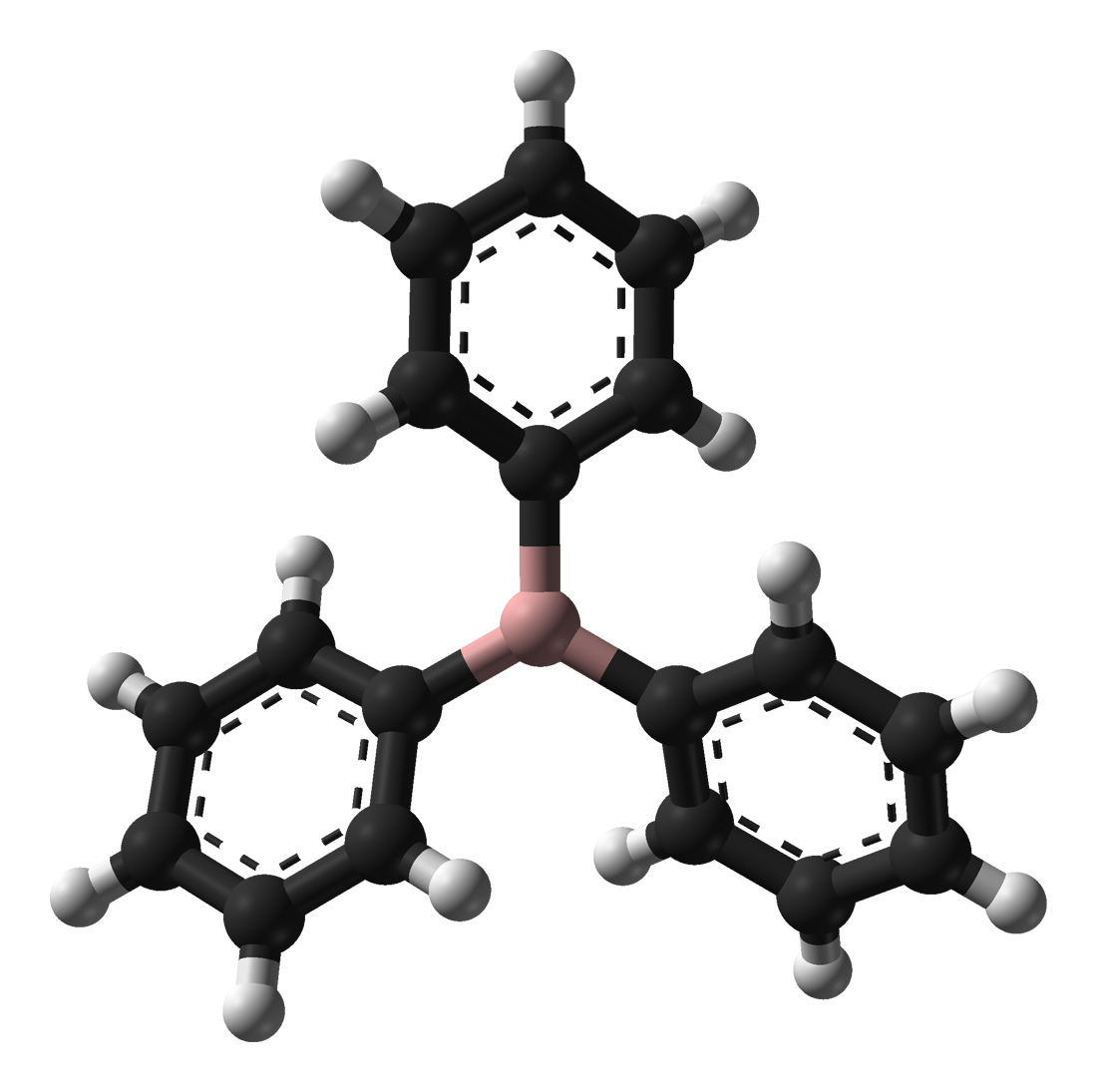

Names
- Preferred IUPAC name Triphenylborane

Identifiers
CAS Number	960-71-4
3D model (JSmol)	Interactive image
ChemSpider	63579
ECHA InfoCard	100.012.277
EC Number	213-504-2
PubChem CID	70400
UNII	6282553L0G
CompTox Dashboard (EPA)	DTXSID6027345
- InChI: InChI=1S/C18H15B/c1-4-10-16(11-5-1)19(17-12-6-2-7-13-17)18-14-8-3-9-15-18/h1-15H Key: MXSVLWZRHLXFKH-UHFFFAOYSA-N; InChI=1/C18H15B/c1-4-10-16(11-5-1)19(17-12-6-2-7-13-17)18-14-8-3-9-15-18/h1-15H Key: MXSVLWZRHLXFKH-UHFFFAOYAV
- SMILES: B(c1ccccc1)(c2ccccc2)c3ccccc3

Properties
Chemical formula	B(C_{6}H_{5})_{3}
Molar mass	242.13 g·mol^{−1}
Appearance	White crystals
Melting point	142 °C (288 °F; 415 K)
Boiling point	203 °C (397 °F; 476 K) (15 mmHg)
Solubility in water	Insoluble

Structure
Molecular shape	trigonal planar

Hazards
- GHS labelling
Pictograms	(GHS02: Flammable)
Signal word	Warning
Hazard statements	H228
Precautionary statements	P210, P240, P241, P280, P370+P378

Related compounds
Related isoelectronic	Triphenylmethyl cation
- Except where otherwise noted, data are given for materials in their standard state (at 25 °C [77 °F], 100 kPa). verify (what is ?) Infobox references

Triphenylborane is a chemical compound with the chemical formula B(C_{6}H_{5})_{3}, often abbreviated to BPh_{3}, where Ph is the phenyl group. It is a white crystalline solid and is both air and moisture sensitive, slowly forming benzene and triphenylboroxine. It is soluble in aromatic solvents.

== Structure and properties ==
The core of the compound, BC_{3}, has a trigonal planar structure. The phenyl groups are rotated at about a 30° angle from the core plane.

Even though triphenylborane and tris(pentafluorophenyl)borane are structurally similar, their Lewis acidity is not. BPh_{3} is a weak Lewis acid while B(C_{6}F_{5})_{3} is a strong Lewis acid due to the electronegativity of the fluorine atoms. Other boron Lewis acids include BF_{3} and BCl_{3}.

== Synthesis ==
Triphenylborane was first synthesized in 1922. It is typically made with boron trifluoride diethyl etherate and the Grignard reagent, phenylmagnesium bromide.

BF_{3}·O(C_{2}H_{5})_{2} + 3 C_{6}H_{5}MgBr → B(C_{6}H_{5})_{3} + 3 MgBrF + (C_{2}H_{5})_{2}O

Triphenylborane can also be synthesized on a smaller scale by the thermal decomposition of trimethylammonium tetraphenylborate.

[NH(CH_{3})_{3}]^{+}[B(C_{6}H_{5})_{4}]^{−} → B(C_{6}H_{5})_{3} + N(CH_{3})_{3} + C_{6}H_{6}

== Applications ==
Triphenylborane is made commercially by a process developed by Du Pont for use in its hydrocyanation of butadiene to adiponitrile, a nylon intermediate. Du Pont produces triphenylborane by reacting sodium metal, a haloaromatic (chlorobenzene), and a secondary alkyl borate ester.

Triphenylborane can be used to make triarylborane amine complexes, such as pyridine-triphenylborane. Triarylborane amine complexes are used as catalysts for the polymerization of acrylic esters.
