= Phenylsodium =

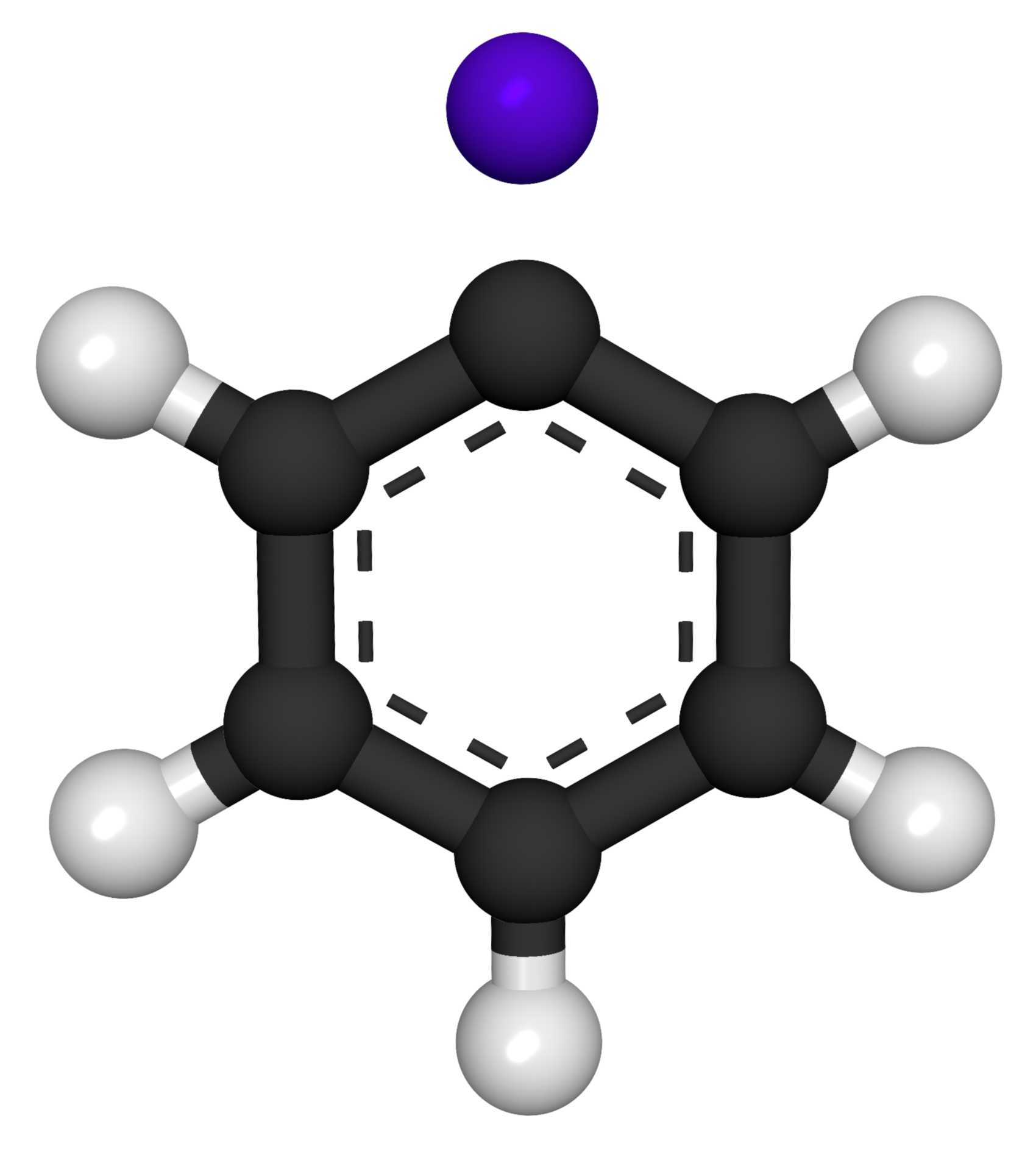

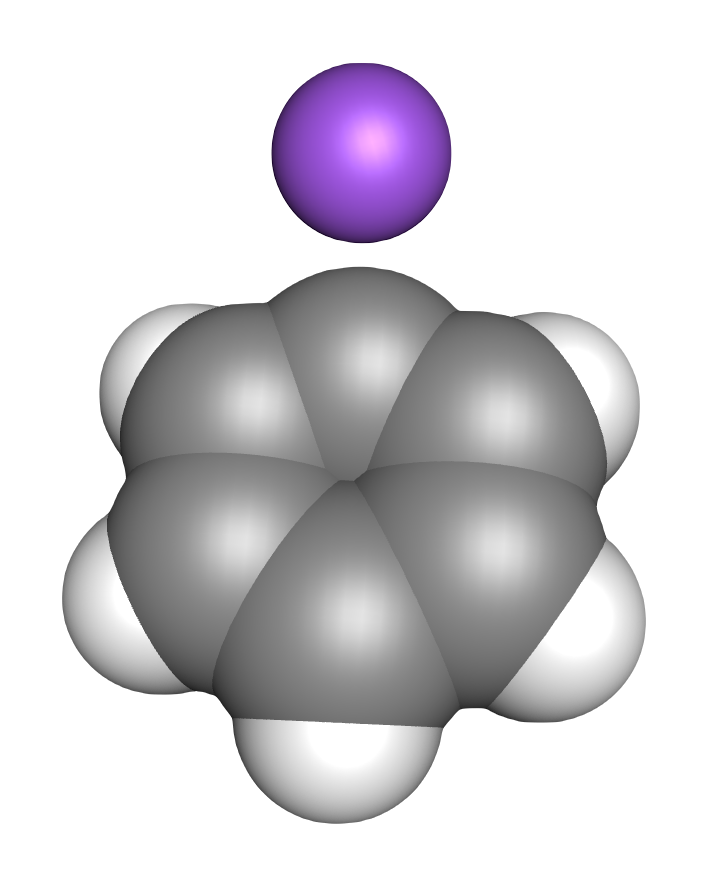

Names
- IUPAC name Sodium benzenide
- Other names: Sodium phenyl; Sodiobenzene

Identifiers
CAS Number	1623-99-0
3D model (JSmol)	Interactive image
Abbreviations	PhNa; NaPh
ChemSpider	9183013
PubChem CID	11007827
UNII	SNA8TW8V4T
CompTox Dashboard (EPA)	DTXSID301316871
- InChI: InChI=1S/C6H5.Na/c1-2-4-6-5-3-1;/h1-5H;/q-1;+1 Key: KSMWLICLECSXMI-UHFFFAOYSA-N
- SMILES: [Na]C1=CC=CC=C1

Properties
Chemical formula	C_{6}H_{5}Na
Molar mass	100.096 g·mol^{−1}
Appearance	Yellowish-white powder
Solubility in water	Reacts
Solubility	Insoluble in hydrocarbons, reacts with ether

Hazards
- Occupational safety and health (OHS/OSH)
Main hazards	Corrosive, pyrophoric in air

Related compounds
Related compounds	Phenyllithium; Phenylcopper; Phenylsilver; Diphenylzinc; Diphenylmercury; Triphenylborane; Tetraphenylmethane; Tetraphenyllead
- Except where otherwise noted, data are given for materials in their standard state (at 25 °C [77 °F], 100 kPa). Infobox references

Phenylsodium C_{6}H_{5}Na is an organosodium compound. Solid phenylsodium was first isolated by Nef in 1903. Although the behavior of phenylsodium and phenyl magnesium bromide are similar, the organosodium compound is very rarely used.

== Synthesis ==
The existence of phenylsodium was originally proposed by August Kekulé after observing the formation of sodium benzoate in the reaction of bromobenzene with sodium under carbon dioxide.

=== Transmetalation ===
In the original synthesis, diphenylmercury and sodium was shown to yield a suspension of phenylsodium:

(C_{6}H_{5})_{2}Hg + 3 Na → 2 C_{6}H_{5}Na + NaHg

The Shorigen reaction is also used in the generation of phenylsodium, where an alkyl sodium compound is treated with benzene:

RNa + C_{6}H_{6} → RH + C_{6}H_{5}Na

The method can also result in the addition of a second sodium. This dimetallation occurs in the meta and para positions. The use of certain alkyl sodium compounds such as n-amyl sodium is known to greatly increase this dimetallation effect.

=== Metal-halogen exchange ===
A common route to phenylsodium utilizes powdered sodium with bromobenzene:

C_{6}H_{5}Br + 2 Na → C_{6}H_{5}Na + NaBr

The yield of this method is lowered by the formation of diphenyl due to phenylsodium reacting with aryl halide starting material

=== Lithium exchange ===
A more modern synthesis involves the reaction of phenyllithium and NaOtBu:

C_{6}H_{5}Li + tBuO^{−}Na^{+} → C_{6}H_{5}Na + tBuO^{−}Li^{+}

== Properties and structure ==
Structure of the phenylsodium-PMDTA adduct, hydrogen atoms omitted for clarity.

The first syntheses of phenylsodium which employed the organomercury route seemed to yield a light brown powder. It was discovered by Wilhelm Schlenk that this product was contaminated by sodium amalgam. Centrifugation allowed for the isolation of pure phenylsodium which appears as a yellowish-white amorphous powder which readily bursts into flames.

Like phenyllithium, adducts of the compound with PMDTA have been crystallized. While phenyllithium forms a monomeric adduct with PMDTA, phenylsodium exists as a dimer, reflecting the larger radius of sodium.

Complexes of phenylsodium and magnesium alkoxides, especially magnesium 2-ethoxyethoxide Mg(OCH_{2}CH_{2}OEt)_{2}, are soluble in benzene. The complex is formed by the reaction:

NaPh + Mg(OCH_{2}CH_{2}OEt)_{2} → Na_{2}MgPh_{2}(OCH_{2}CH_{2}OEt)_{2}

Although the phenylsodium is complexed, it maintains its phenylation and metalation ability. Additionally, the complex is highly stable in benzene retaining its reactivity after a month of storage.

Phenyllithium can also be used to modify the properties of phenylsodium. Ordinarily, phenylsodium reacts violently with diethyl ether, but Georg Wittig showed that by synthesizing PhNa with PhLi in ether, the complex (C_{6}H_{5}Li)(C_{6}H_{5}Na)_{n} was formed. The phenylsodium component of the complex reacts before the phenyllithium, making it an effective compound to stabilize the highly reactive sodium compound. This complex could be isolated as solid crystals which were soluble in ether and remained stable in solution at room temperature for several days. Phenyllithium is able to stabilize phenylsodium in a ratio as high as 1:24 Li:Na, although this produces an insoluble mass which could be still used for reactions.

== Reactions ==
Reactions involving phenylsodium were employed as early as the mid 19th century, although before 1903. Typically phenylsodium is prepared in situ analogous to methods used for Grignard reagents. The work of Acree provides a number of examples of reactions involving the compound.

=== Cross-coupling ===
The reaction with ethyl bromide produces ethylbenzene:

NaPh + BrEt → PhEt + NaBr

An analogous reaction also occurs in the preparation of phenylsodium to produce diphenyl:

NaPh + PhBr → Ph-Ph + NaBr

Reaction of benzyl chloride and phenylsodium results in diphenylmethane and (E)-stilbene. Diphenylmethane is the expected product from the substitution of chloride. The formation of stilbene is implicates radical intermediates like those proposed in the Wurtz-Fittig reaction mechanism.

The reaction of phenylsodium with benzoyl chloride yields, after hydrolysis, triphenylcarbinol. Benzophenone is proposed as an intermediate.

2NaPh + PhCOCl → Ph3CONa + NaCl

=== Metallation ===
Metallation reactions with phenylsodium proceed in the following general form:

PhNa + RH → C_{6}H_{6} + RNa

The metallation is confirmed/detected by treatment of the metallated compound with carbon dioxide, affording the corresponding sodium carboxylate which can be acidified to yield the carboxylic acid:

RNa + CO_{2} → RCO_{2}Na

Metallation follows a generally predictable order of reactivity. Benzene can be metallated by alkylsodium compounds resulting in phenylsodium. The phenylsodium is then able to metallate other aromatic compounds. The most commonly used reagent for metallation by phenylsodium is toluene, producing benzylsodium. Toluene can be metallated by synthesizing phenylsodium in toluene instead of benzene:

C_{6}H_{5}Cl + 2Na + C_{6}H_{5}CH_{3} → C_{6}H_{6} + NaCl + C_{6}H_{5}CH_{2}Na

The benzylsodium can then be used in a nucleophilic addition. The effectiveness of the metallation can be determined by carbonating and isolating the phenylacetic acid product.

== See also ==
- Phenylcopper
