= Tetraphenyltin =

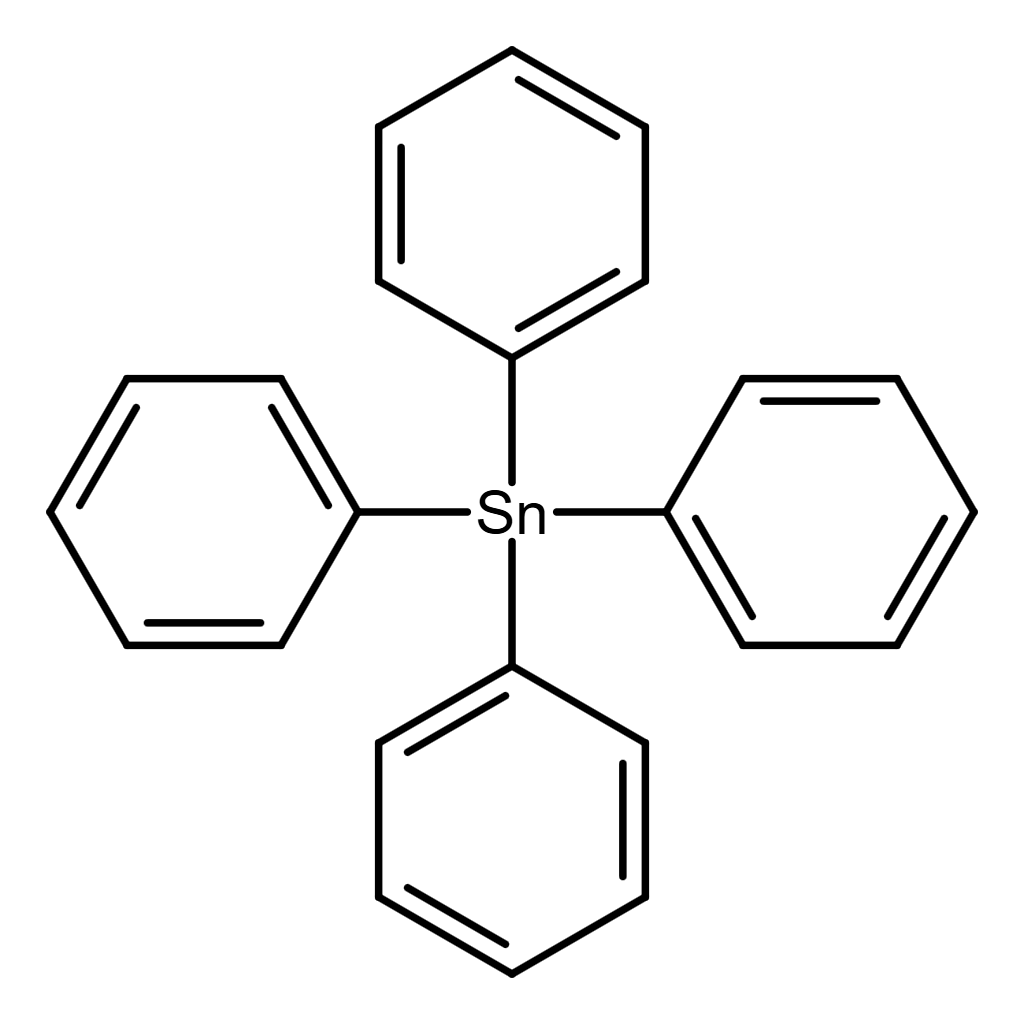

Names
- IUPAC name Tetraphenylstannane
- Other names: Tetraphenyltin; Tin tetraphenyl

Identifiers
CAS Number	595-90-4
3D model (JSmol)	Interactive image
ChemSpider	55093
ECHA InfoCard	100.008.977
EC Number	209-872-9
PubChem CID	61146
UNII	E61E04398N
CompTox Dashboard (EPA)	DTXSID9022071
- InChI: InChI=1S/4C6H5.Sn/c4*1-2-4-6-5-3-1;/h4*1-5H; Key: CRHIAMBJMSSNNM-UHFFFAOYSA-N
- SMILES: C1=CC=C(C=C1)[Sn](C2=CC=CC=C2)(C3=CC=CC=C3)C4=CC=CC=C4

Properties
Chemical formula	Sn(C_{6}H_{5})_{4}
Molar mass	427.134 g·mol^{−1}
Appearance	White crystalline solid
Density	1.49 g/cm^{3}
Melting point	224 to 227 °C (435 to 441 °F; 497 to 500 K)
Boiling point	420 °C (788 °F; 693 K)
Solubility in water	Insoluble
Solubility	Toluene, ethanol, chloroform, xylene

Structure
Molecular shape	Tetrahedral at Sn

Hazards
- Occupational safety and health (OHS/OSH)
Main hazards	Neurotoxin. Very toxic to aquatic life with long lasting effects. May create explosive mixtures with air.
- GHS labelling
Pictograms	(GHS06: Toxic) (GHS09: Environmental hazard)
Signal word	Danger
Hazard statements	H301, H311, H330, H331, H410
Precautionary statements	P260, P262, P264, P270, P271, P273, P280, P284, P301+P316, P302+P352, P304+P340, P310, P311, P312, P320, P321, P330, P361+P364, P391, P403+P233, P405, P501
Flash point	111 °C (232 °F)
- NIOSH (US health exposure limits)
PEL (Permissible)	0.1 mg/m^{3}, as Sn

Related compounds
Other anions	Tetramethyltin; Tetraethyltin; Tetrapropyltin; Tetrabutyltin
Other cations	Tetraphenylmethane; Tetraphenylsilane; Tetraphenylgermanium; Tetraphenyllead
- Except where otherwise noted, data are given for materials in their standard state (at 25 °C [77 °F], 100 kPa). Infobox references

Tetraphenyltin is an organotin compound with the chemical formula Sn(C_{6}H_{5})_{4}, often abbreviated as SnPh_{4}, where Ph is phenyl. It is a white crystalline solid.

== Preparation ==
Tetraphenyltin can be prepared in high yield by the reaction of chlorobenzene, tin(IV) chloride and sodium metal in dry toluene.

2 Na + C_{6}H_{5}Cl → C_{6}H_{5}Na + NaCl
4 C_{6}H_{5}Na + SnCl_{4} → Sn(C_{6}H_{5})_{4} + 4 NaCl

== Uses ==
Tetraphenyltin is used as a catalyst in polymerization reactions. It is a stabilizer in chlorinated transformer oils.

== Safety ==
Tetraphenyltin is potential endocrine disrupting compound. It is a neurotoxin. It is very toxic to aquatic life with long lasting effects. It is toxic if swallowed, in contact with skin or if inhaled. It is dangerous to eyes. It is flammable. The result of combustion is carbon monoxide, carbon dioxide and tin oxides (e.g. SnO_{2}). Vapors of combustion are heavier than air and may spread along floors. Tetraphenyltin vapor forms explosive mixtures with air on intense heating. Its vapor density is 14.7 times greater than air. It is an irritant.
