= Diphenylzinc =

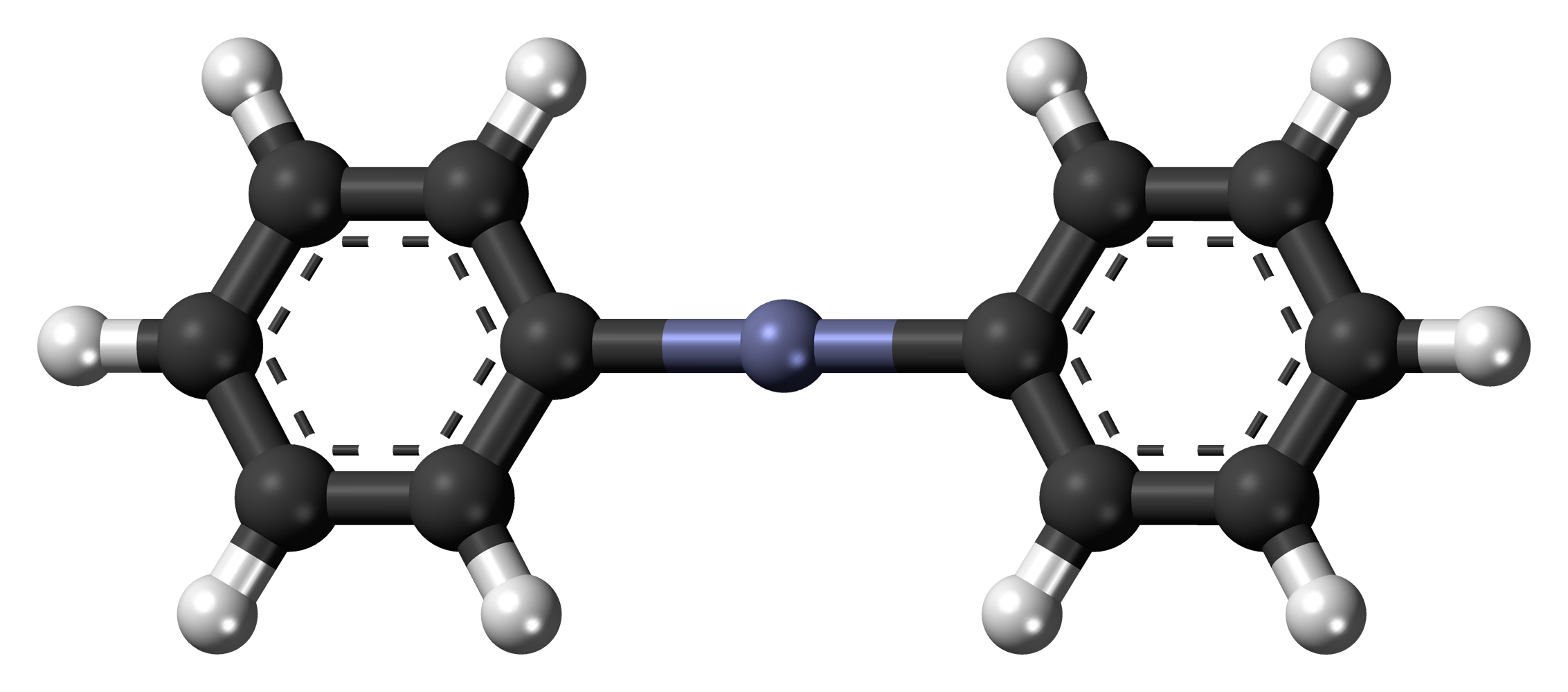

Names
- IUPAC name Diphenylzinc

Identifiers
CAS Number	1078-58-6
3D model (JSmol)	Interactive image
Beilstein Reference	3603125
ChEBI	CHEBI:51499
ChemSpider	10395624
ECHA InfoCard	100.012.803
EC Number	214-082-2
Gmelin Reference	28161
PubChem CID	517896
CompTox Dashboard (EPA)	DTXSID50910524
- InChI: InChI=1S/2C6H5.Zn/c2*1-2-4-6-5-3-1;/h2*1-5H; Key: MKRVHLWAVKJBFN-UHFFFAOYSA-N
- SMILES: C1([Zn]C2=CC=CC=C2)=CC=CC=C1

Properties
Chemical formula	Zn(C_{6}H_{5})_{2}
Molar mass	219.59 g·mol^{−1}
Appearance	White crystals
Melting point	107 °C (225 °F; 380 K)
Boiling point	280–285 °C (536–545 °F; 553–558 K)

Hazards
- GHS labelling
Pictograms	(GHS02: Flammable)
Signal word	Danger
Hazard statements	H228, H250
Precautionary statements	P210, P222, P240, P241, P280, P302+P334, P370+P378, P422

Related compounds
Related compounds	Diphenylcadmium; Diphenylmercury; Dimethylzinc; Diethylzinc; Phenylcopper; Phenyllithium; Phenylsodium
- Except where otherwise noted, data are given for materials in their standard state (at 25 °C [77 °F], 100 kPa). verify (what is ?) Infobox references

Diphenylzinc is an organozinc compound with the chemical formula Zn(C_{6}H_{5})_{2}, often abbreviated as ZnPh_{2}, where Ph is phenyl. It is in a form of white crystals. It is commonly used as the synthetic equivalent of a Ph^{−} synthon. Solvent-free diphenylzinc exists as dimeric PhZn(μ-Ph)_{2}ZnPh molecules in the solid state, where Ph is phenyl.

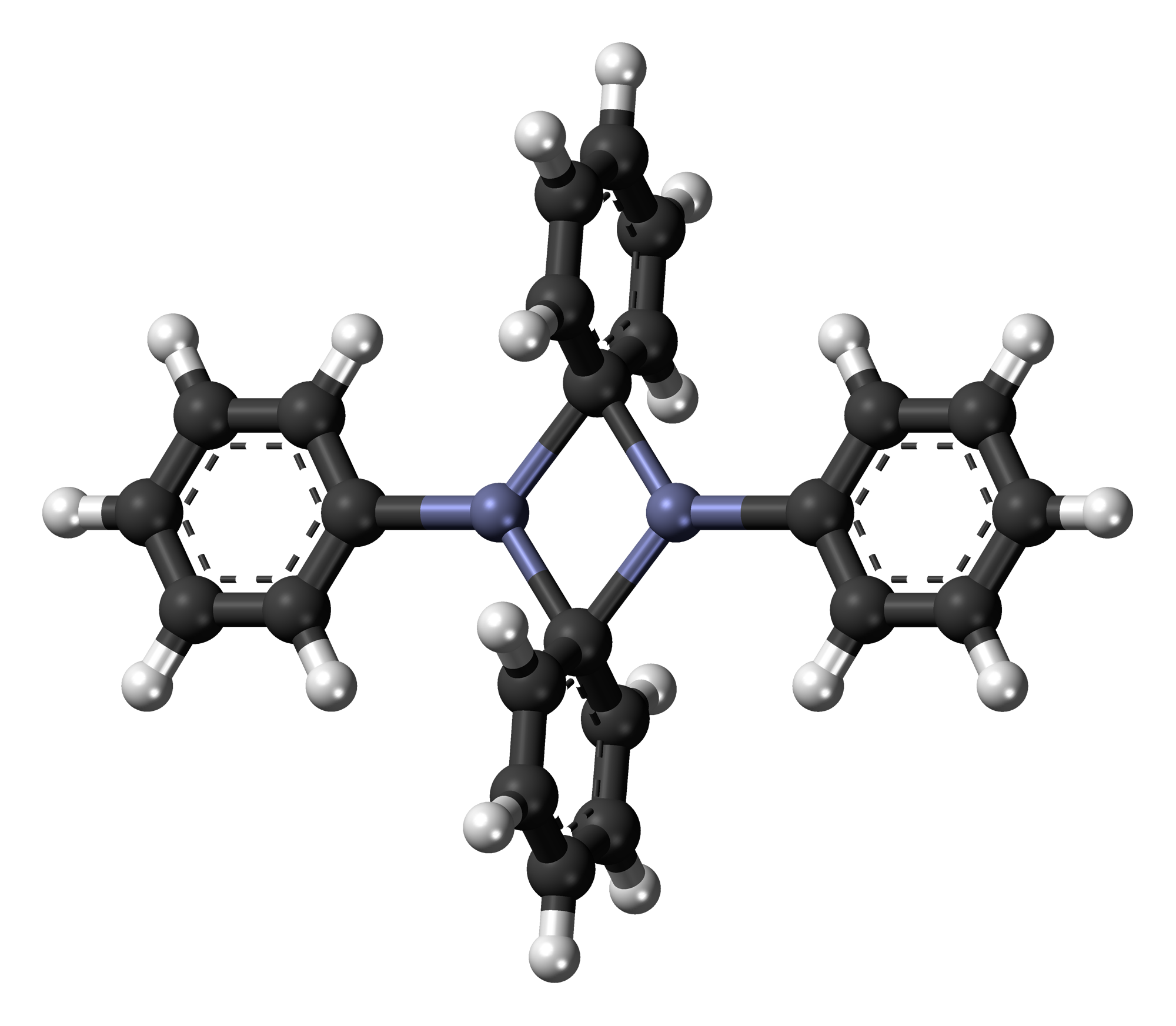
The dimeric solid state form of diphenylzinc.

Diphenylzinc is commercially available. It may be prepared by reaction of phenyllithium with zinc bromide:

2 PhLi + ZnBr_{2} → Ph_{2}Zn + 2 LiBr

It may also be prepared by the reaction of phenylmagnesium bromide with zinc chloride or diphenylmercury with zinc metal.
