= Phenylsilver =

Identifiers
CAS Number	5274-48-6
3D model (JSmol)	Interactive image
Abbreviations	PhAg; AgPh
PubChem CID	12476329
- InChI: InChI=1S/C6H5.Ag/c1-2-4-6-5-3-1;/h1-5H;/q-1;+1 Key: APUVPJCKRFJPND-UHFFFAOYSA-N
- SMILES: c1ccccc1[Ag]

Properties
Chemical formula	C_{6}H_{5}Ag
Molar mass	184.974 g·mol^{−1}
Appearance	white solid

Related compounds
Related compounds	Phenylcopper; Phenylsodium
- Except where otherwise noted, data are given for materials in their standard state (at 25 °C [77 °F], 100 kPa). Infobox references

Phenylsilver is an organosilver compound with the chemical formula C_{6}H_{5}Ag. It is a white solid. The structure is a one-dimensional coordination polymer of silver(I) tetrads.

== Synthesis ==
Phenylsilver can be produced by treating silver nitrate with trialkylphenyltin (or trialkylphenyllead at −10 °C). In the presence of excess silver nitrate, the reaction produces the bright yellow complex C_{6}H_{5}Ag·2AgNO_{3}. Phenylsilver can also be produced by treating silver nitrate with diphenylzinc in a 1:2 molar ratio and 0 °C. If the molar ratio is 1:1, it will produce orange C_{6}H_{5}Ag·2AgNO_{3}. Earlier syntheses using phenyl magnesium bromide will produce phenylsilver that contains silver or magnesium salt impurities, which destabilize it.

When heating phenylsilver at a speed of 5 °C/min, it decomposes at 67 °C. If the heating speed is 10 °C/min, it will explode at 47 °C.

2 C_{6}H_{5}Ag → C_{6}H_{5}−C_{6}H_{5} + 2 Ag
