= Phenyllithium =

- Kekulé, skeletal formula of phenyllithium

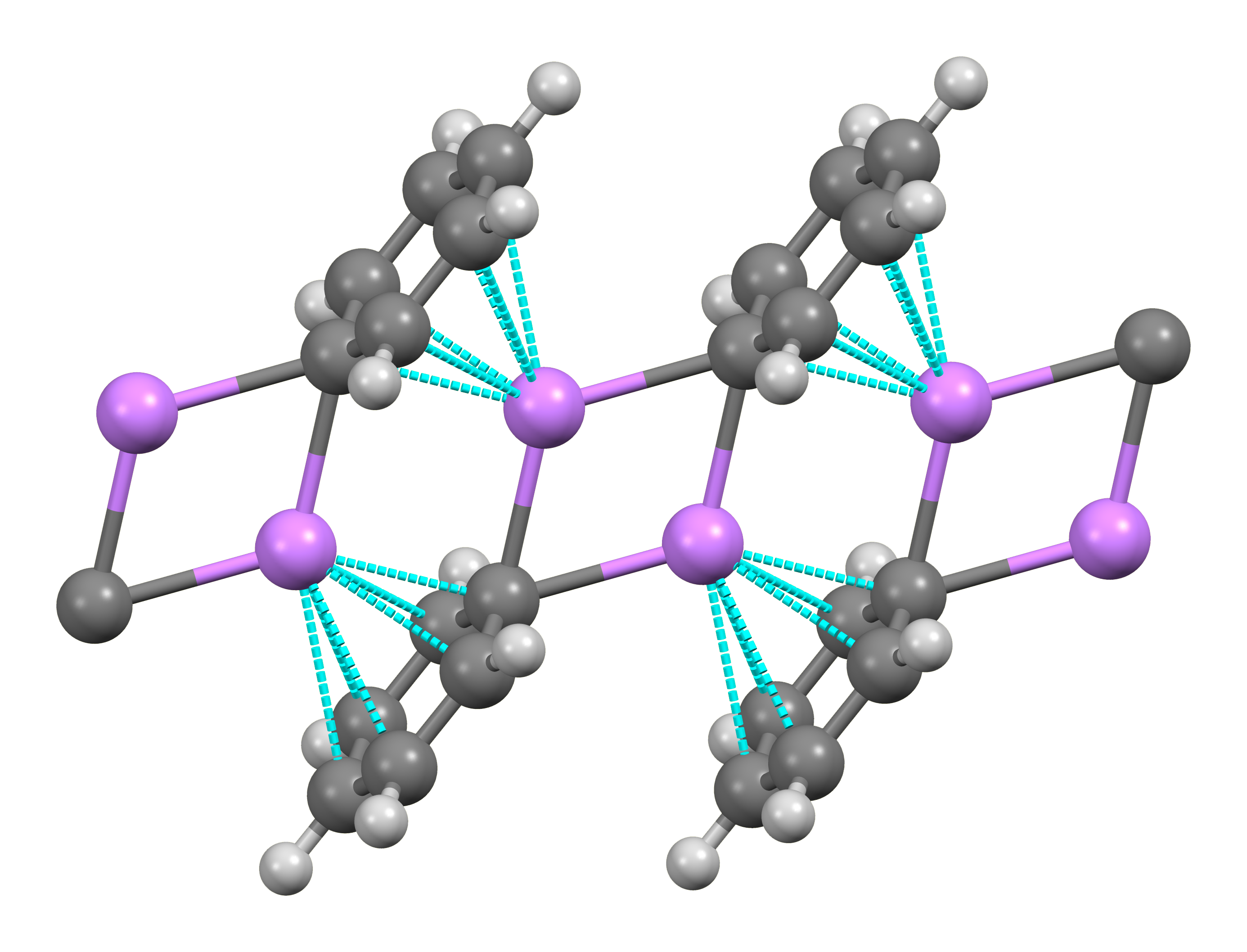

Names
- Systematic IUPAC name Phenyllithium
- Other names Lithiobenzene

Identifiers
CAS Number	591-51-5
3D model (JSmol)	Interactive image
Abbreviations	PhLi; LiPh
Beilstein Reference	506502
ChEBI	CHEBI:51470
ChemSpider	10254416
ECHA InfoCard	100.008.838
EC Number	209-720-1
Gmelin Reference	2849
MeSH	phenyllithium
PubChem CID	637932
UNII	9R6M9UV6QM
CompTox Dashboard (EPA)	DTXSID70938503 DTXSID20883453, DTXSID70938503
- InChI: InChI=1S/C6H5.Li/c1-2-4-6-5-3-1;/h1-5H; Key: NHKJPPKXDNZFBJ-UHFFFAOYSA-N
- SMILES: [Li]c1ccccc1

Properties
Chemical formula	C_{6}H_{5}Li
Molar mass	84.05 g·mol^{−1}
Appearance	Colorless crystals
Density	0.828 g/cm^{3}
Boiling point	140 to 143 °C (284 to 289 °F; 413 to 416 K)
Solubility in water	Reacts

Thermochemistry
Std enthalpy of formation (Δ_{f}H^{⦵}_{298})	48.3 to 52.5 kJ/mol

Hazards
- GHS labelling
Pictograms	(GHS02: Flammable) (GHS05: Corrosive) (GHS07: Exclamation mark)
Signal word	Danger
Hazard statements	H226, H250, H261, H302, H312, H314, H332
Precautionary statements	P210, P222, P231+P232, P233, P240, P241, P242, P243, P260, P264, P270, P271, P280, P301+P312, P301+P330+P331, P302+P334, P302+P352, P303+P361+P353, P304+P312, P304+P340, P305+P351+P338, P310, P312, P321, P322, P330, P363, P370+P378, P402+P404, P403+P235, P405, P422, P501
Safety data sheet (SDS)	External MSDS

Related compounds
Related compounds	Phenylsodium; Phenylcopper
- Except where otherwise noted, data are given for materials in their standard state (at 25 °C [77 °F], 100 kPa). verify (what is ?) Infobox references

Phenyllithium is an organometallic agent with the empirical formula C_{6}H_{5}Li. It is most commonly used as a metalating agent in organic syntheses and a substitute for Grignard reagents for introducing phenyl groups in organic syntheses. Crystalline phenyllithium is colorless; however, solutions of phenyllithium are various shades of brown or red depending on the solvent used and the impurities present in the solute.

== Preparation ==
Phenyllithium was first produced by the reaction of lithium metal with diphenylmercury:

(C_{6}Η_{5})_{2}Ηg + 2 Li → 2 C_{6}Η_{5}Li + Ηg

Reaction of a phenyl halide with lithium metal produces phenyllithium:

Ph−X + 2 Li → Ph−Li + LiX

Phenyllithium can also be synthesized with a metal-halogen exchange reaction:

n-BuLi + Ph−X → n-BuX + Ph−Li

The predominant method of producing phenyllithium today are the latter two syntheses.

== Reactions ==
The primary use of PhLi is to facilitate formation of carbon-carbon bonds by nucleophilic addition and substitution reactions:

PhLi + R_{2}C=O → PhR_{2}CO^{−}Li^{+}

2-Phenylpyridine is prepared by the reaction of phenyl lithium with pyridine, a process that entails an addition-elimination pathway:

C_{6}H_{5}Li + C_{5}H_{5}N → C_{6}H_{5}−C_{5}H_{4}N + LiH

== Structure and properties ==
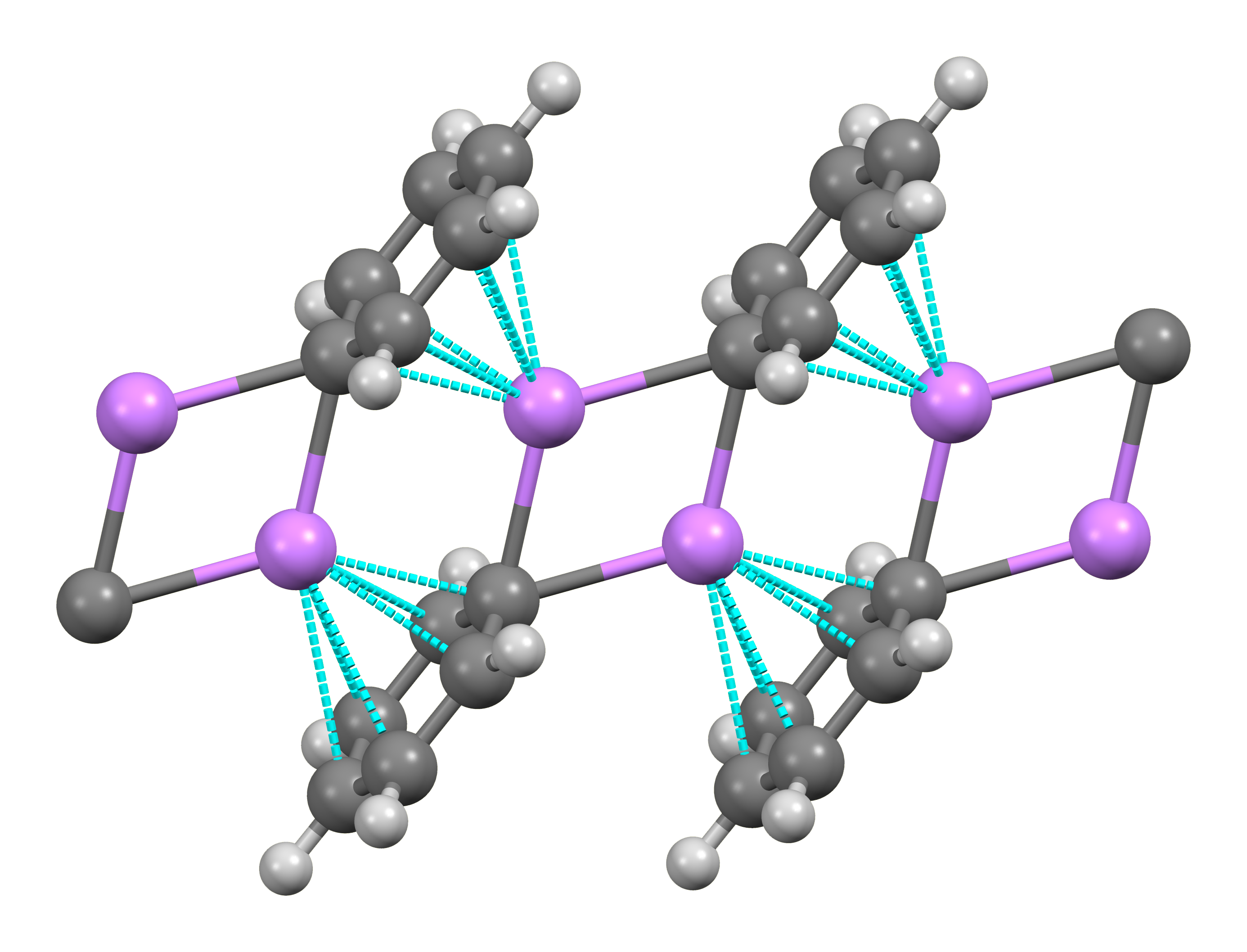
Ball-and-stick model for the unsolvated phenyllithium crystal "ladder"

Phenyllithium is an organolithium compound that forms monoclinic crystals. Solid phenyllithium can be described as consisting of dimeric Li_{2}Ph_{2} subunits. The Li atoms and the ipso carbons of the phenyl rings form a planar four-membered ring. The plane of the phenyl groups are perpendicular to the plane of this Li_{2}C_{2} ring. Additional strong intermolecular bonding occurs between these phenyllithium dimers and the π-electrons of the phenyl groups in the adjacent dimers, resulting in an infinite polymeric ladder structure.

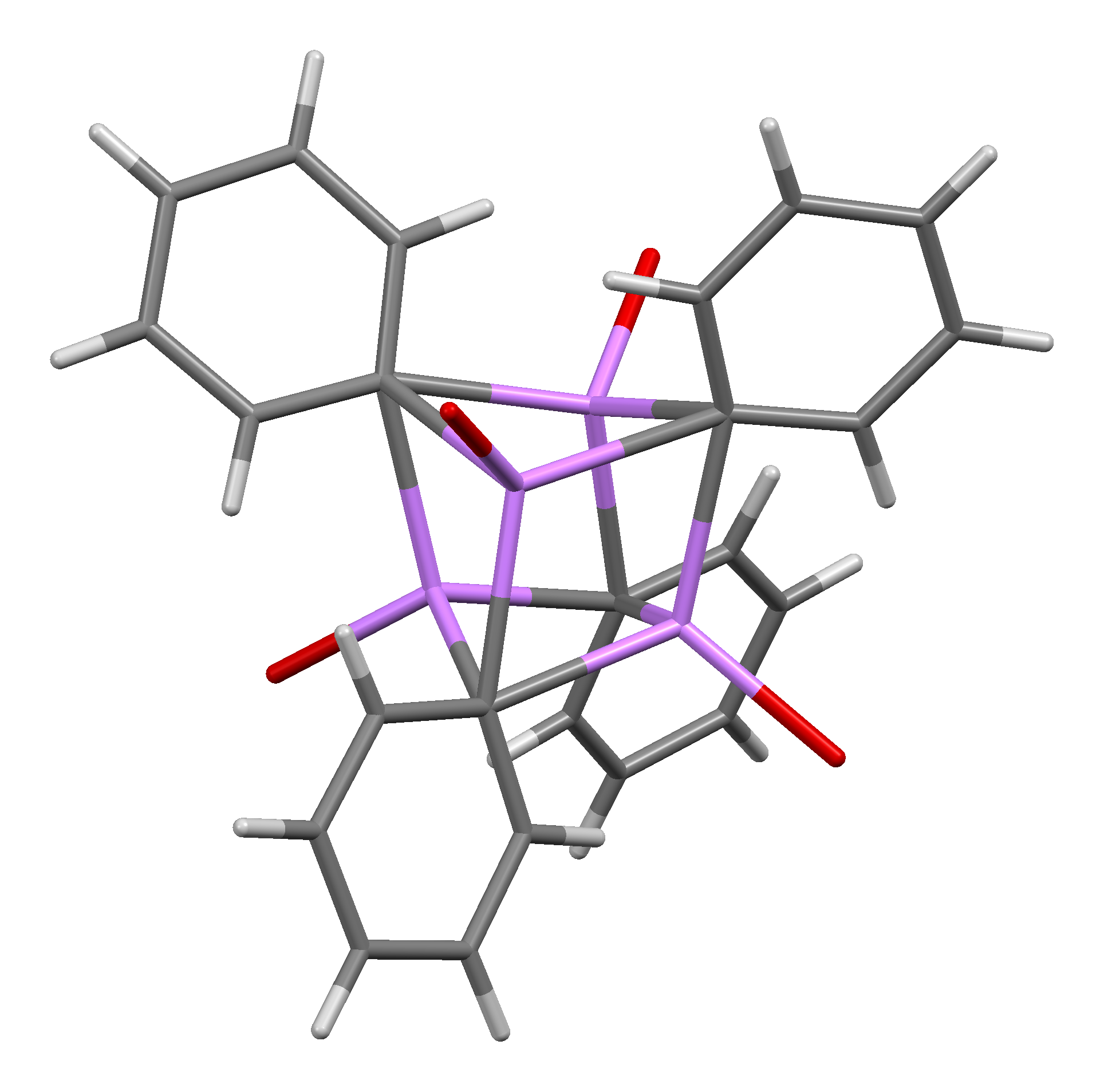
Stick model (ethyl groups omitted for clarity) of a phenyllithium etherate tetramer crystal

In solution, it takes a variety of structures dependent on the organic solvent. In tetrahydrofuran, it equilibrates between monomer and dimer states. In ether, as it is commonly sold, phenyllithium exists as a tetramer. Four Li atoms and four ipso carbon centers occupy alternating vertices of a distorted cube. Phenyl groups are at the faces of the tetrahedron and bind to three of the nearest Li atoms.

The C–Li bond lengths are an average of 2.33 Å. An ether molecule binds to each of the Li sites through its oxygen atom. In the presence of LiBr, a byproduct of directly reacting lithium with a phenyl halide, the [(PhLi·Et_{2}O)_{4}] complex instead becomes [(PhLi·Et_{2}O)_{3}·LiBr]. The Li atom of LiBr occupies one of the lithium sites in the cubane-type cluster and Br atom sits in an adjacent carbon site.
