= Georg Ludwig Carius =

German chemist (1829–1875)

A simple sealed tube (Carius tube). Thick-walled glass tube (left), filled with reaction mixture (center) and sealed tube (right).

Georg Ludwig Carius (August 24, 1829 – April 24, 1875) was a German chemist born in Barbis, in the Kingdom of Hanover. He studied under Friedrich Wöhler and was assistant to Robert Bunsen for 6 years. He was Director of the Marburger Chemical Institute (Marburger Chemischen Instituts) of Philipps University of Marburg from 1865. He is noted for the studies of oxidation for which he developed a method involving high temperature digestion in a sealed tube. Heavy wall sealed tubes, as used for digestion or thermolysis, are referred to as "Carius tubes". He also wrote a textbook on polybasic acids.

== See also ==
- Organosilver chemistry
