= Organosilver chemistry =

Study of chemical compounds containing carbon-silver chemical bonds

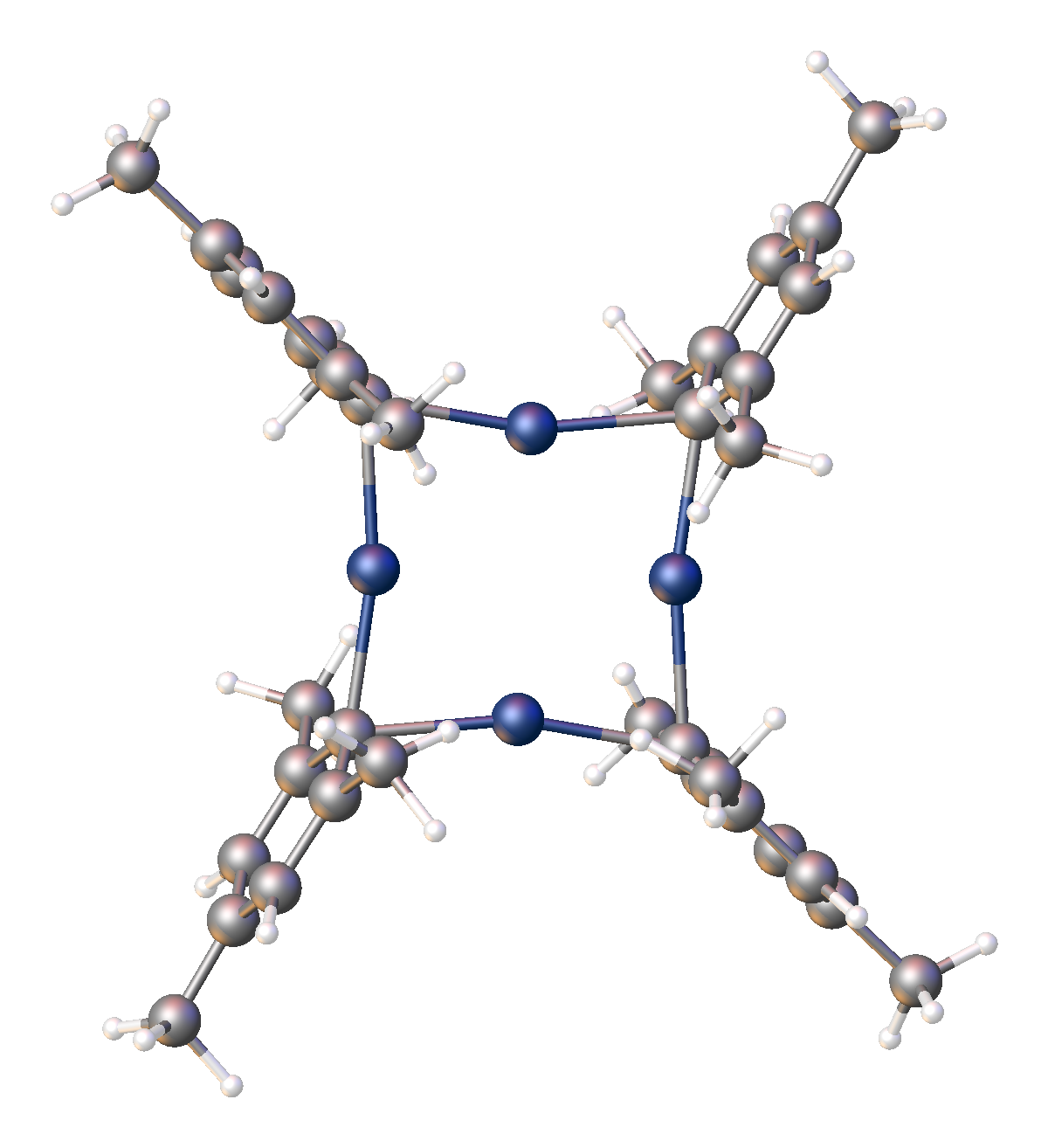
Structure of silver mesityl tetramer.

Organosilver chemistry is the study of organometallic compounds containing a carbon to silver chemical bond. The theme is less developed than organocopper chemistry.

The first attempts in organosilver were recorded by Buckton in 1859 and by J. A. Wanklyn & L. Carius in 1861. The synthesis of methyl silver was described by Semerano and Riccoboni Poor thermal stability is reflected in decomposition temperatures of AgMe (-50 °C) versus CuMe (-15 °C) and PhAg (74 °C) vs PhCu (100 °C).

== Alkyl, alkenyl, aryl derivatives ==
Phenylsilver can be obtained by reaction of silver nitrate with a trialkylphenyllead or diphenylzinc:

Ph_{2}Zn + AgNO_{3} → PhAg + "PhZnNO_{3}"

Like all silver complexes, organosilver compounds have coordination numbers ≥2. For example, mesitylsilver is a tetramer with 2-coordinate Ag(I) centers. It is produced by reaction of silver chloride and the Grignard reagent:

AgCl + (CH_{3})_{3}C_{6}H_{2}MgBr → 1/4 [(CH_{3})_{3}C_{6}H_{2}Ag]_{4} + MgClBr

A variety of organosilver compounds include phosphorus ylides. A simple example is the pentafluorophenylsilver complex of methylenetriphenylphosphorane:

AgC_{6}F_{5} + Ph_{3}P=CH_{2} → Ph_{3}P=CH_{2}−AgC_{6}F_{5}

Alkenylsilver compounds are also more stable than their alkylsilver counterparts. Vinylsilver can be obtained by reaction of silver nitrate with tetravinyllead:

AgNO_{3} + (CH_{2}=CH)_{4}Pb → (CH_{2}=CH)Ag + (CH_{2}=CH)_{3}PbNO_{3}

=== Fluoroalkyl and fluoroalkenyl derivatives ===
Following established trends, perfluorinated alkyl and alkenyl derivatives of silver exhibit significant thermal stability. An alkenyl derivatives are generated by the addition of silver fluoride to hexafluorobutyne and tetrafluoroallene.

AgF + CF_{2}=CF(CF_{3}) → AgCF(CF_{3})_{2}

Organosilver compounds usually have the oxidation state +1. A notable exception is Ag(CF_{3})_{4}^{−}.

== Carbene and CO complexes ==
Silver forms relatively fragile complexes with CO, including [Ag(CO)_{n}]^{+} (n = 1, 2, 3). The green, planar, paramagnetic Ag(CO)_{3} is stable at 6–15 K and dimerizes at 25–30 K, probably by forming Ag–Ag bonds. Additionally, the silver carbonyl [Ag(CO)] [B(OTeF_{5})_{4}] is known.

Silver-NHC complexes are numerous. Some are commonly used to prepare other NHC complexes by displacing labile ligands. For example, the reaction of the bis(NHC)silver(I) complex with bis(acetonitrile)palladium dichloride or chlorido(dimethyl sulfide)gold(I):

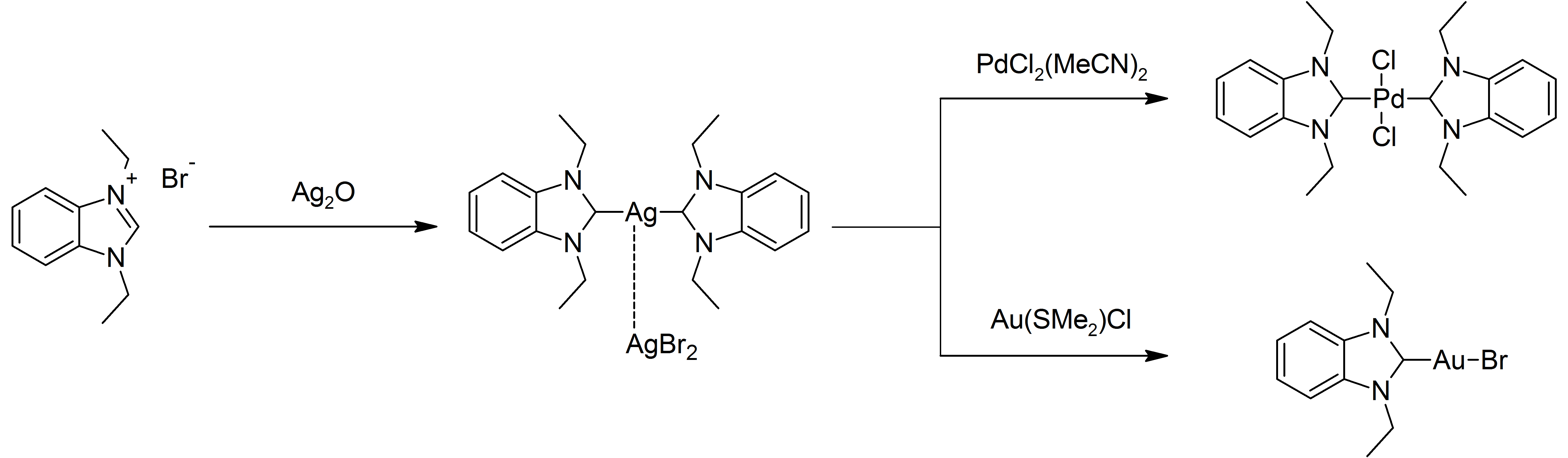

== Alkene complexes ==
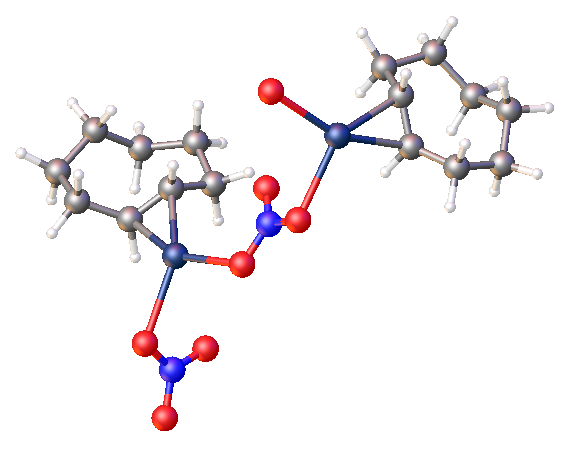
Portion of the structure of the coordination polymer formed from silver nitrate and trans-cyclooctene.

Like other heavy d^{10} metal ions, Ag^{+} has a pronounced affinity for alkenes. The ability of silver to form alkene complexes has long been exploited in the separation of alkenes by "argentation chromatography", which uses a support containing silver salts. Illustrative is [Ag(C_{2}H_{4})_{3}]^{+}.

== Catalysis ==
In catalysis silver is active as silver oxide in the Wolff rearrangement. Silver is also present in other carbon-carbon bond skeletal rearrangements such as the quadricyclane to norbornadiene rearrangement, the cubane to cuneane rearrangement and the rearrangement of the cyclobutadiene dimer to cyclooctatetraene.
