= Carius halogen method =

The Carius halogen method in analytical chemistry is a method for the quantitative determination of halogens in organic compounds, invented by the German chemist Georg Ludwig Carius (1829–1875). A variant of it can determine sulfur.

The method uses fuming nitric acid to completely oxidize the carbon, hydrogen, and nitrogen in organic compounds to CO_{2}, H_{2}O, NO, NO_{2}. The halogen present forms the corresponding silver halide (AgX) with a solution of silver nitrate (AgNO_{3}). It is filtered, washed, dried and weighed. Concentrated nitric acid only oxidises iodine to iodic acid and doesn't affect any other halogens. Even the oxidation of iodine by concentrated nitric acid happens only at high temperatures.

== Procedure ==
- Place around 0.2 g of sample in a small test tube, called the weighing tube. Weigh the weighing tube with the compound inside it.
- Using a thistle funnel with a long stem, introduce about 5 ml of fuming nitric acid into a hard glass tube (the "Carius tube" or "bomb"). Be careful so that the funnel does not touch the side-walls of the tube.
- Drop about 0.5 g of AgNO_{3} salt crystals into the Carius tube.
- Carefully slide the weighing tube into the Carius tube. The weighing tube should be tilted slightly against the Carius tube wall.
- The top of the Carius tube is heated, and pulled into a capillary. The capillary is cooled and then sealed.
- Place the Carius tube in a furnace to heat according to a given schedule. HNO₃ boils at 83 °C, so it would vaporize and react with the substance. The schedule depends on the substance to be analyzed.
  - Aliphatic compounds, or aromatic compounds that oxidise easily: ramp up from room temperature to 150–200 °C, and hold for 2–4 hours .
  - Substances that do not easily oxidise, especially those that contain sulfur: linearly raise to 250 °C over 3 hours, hold at 250 °C for 3 hours, then raise to 300 °C and hold for 3 hours.
- Wait for the tube to completely cool. Examine whether it still contains crystals or oily drops of the undecomposed substance. If so, reopen the capillary, reseal the capillary, and redo the heating.
- Prepare a dry beaker.
- Remove the conical end of the Carius tube. Wash it with distilled water into the beaker. Add distilled water into the Carius tube, then carefully pour the diluted liquid plus the weighing tube into the beaker. Careful not to break the bottom of the beaker with the weighing tube.
- If there is still precipitate in the Carius tube, wash it with distilled water, then pour into the beaker. Repeat until all precipitate is washed off.
- Heat beaker on a wire gauze until the silver halide has settled to the bottom and the supernate is clear.
- Prepare a Gooch crucible for use. Weigh the prepared Gooch crucible.
- Filter the AgX suspension through the Gooch under suction.
- Wash the precipitate in the crucible with hot water until the wash is free of AgNO_{3}. To check this, add hydrochloride acid to the wash, and check that it does not turn turbid (which is AgCl).
- Dry the Gooch crucible at 130–150 °C in an hot air bath, until weight stops changing for 30 minutes. Cool in a desiccator. Reweigh. This produces the final mass of AgX.

Before the Carius tube is sealed, one should take care to never let the fuming nitric acid liquid enter the weighing tube.

=== Calculation ===
The method produces a single measurement: $m_{AgX}$, the final mass of AgX. If the sample contains only one kind of halogen, then this produces the mass of that halogen by stoichiometry. Otherwise, the method is inconclusive.

For example, bromobenzene has the equation C_{6}H_{5}Br, so the mass fraction of bromine in it is $\frac{79.9}{157.0}$. The mass of bromine in the sample is $\frac{79.9}{187.77}m_{AgX}$, assuming no other halogen is present in the sample other than bromine,. The mass of bromobenzene in the sample is $\frac{79.9}{187.77}m_{AgX} / \frac{79.9}{157.0} = \frac{157.0}{187.77}m_{AgX}$, if we further assume no bromine is present in the sample other than in bromobenzene.

== Variants ==
If there are more than one form of halogen present in the sample, then Stas's chlorination method can be used subsequently to measure the total molar amount of halogen in the sample. In the method, the silver halide is heated in an atmosphere of chlorine gas to displace all non-chloride halide with chloride. This sample of AgCl can then be weighed to find its molar amount.

A variant can be used for the determination of sulfur in an organic sample. A sulfur-bearing sample reacts with fuming nitric acid mixed with barium chloride to form the insoluble barium sulfate.
