= Diphenylmercury =

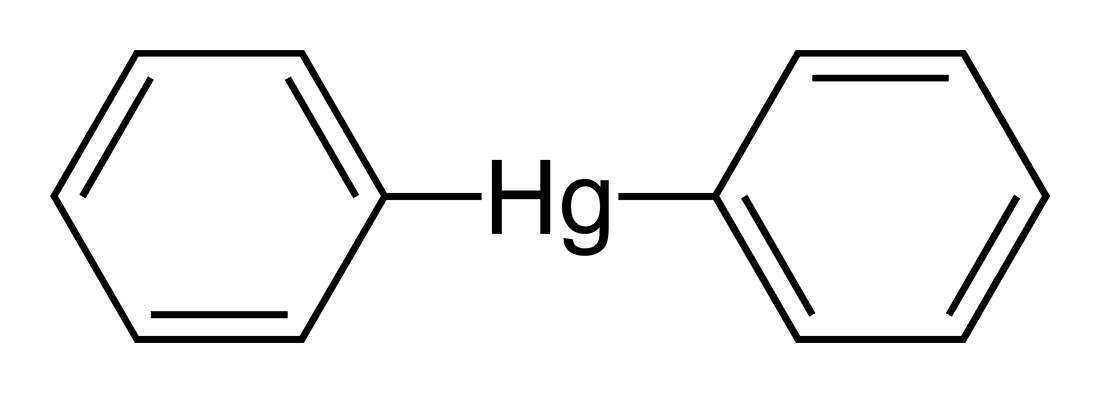

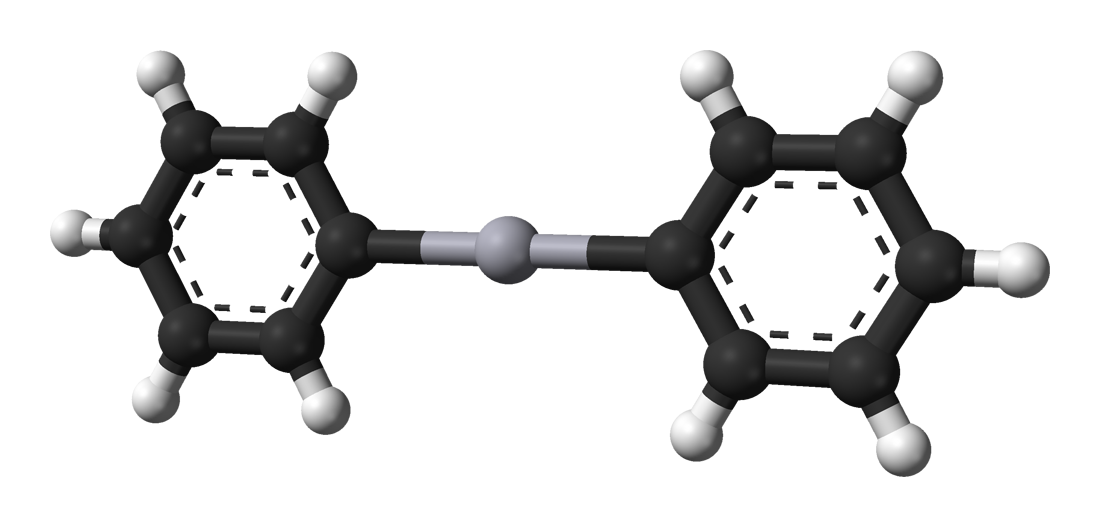

Identifiers
CAS Number	587-85-9
3D model (JSmol)	Interactive image
ChemSpider	11004
ECHA InfoCard	100.008.734
EC Number	209-606-1
PubChem CID	11488
UNII	9JF9FUI57J
CompTox Dashboard (EPA)	DTXSID3042130
- InChI: InChI=1S/2C6H5.Hg/c2*1-2-4-6-5-3-1;/h2*1-5H; Key: HWMTUNCVVYPZHZ-UHFFFAOYSA-N; InChI=1/2C6H5.Hg/c2*1-2-4-6-5-3-1;/h2*1-5H;/rC12H10Hg/c1-3-7-11(8-4-1)13-12-9-5-2-6-10-12/h1-10H Key: HWMTUNCVVYPZHZ-CYESTLPZAK
- SMILES: c1ccc(cc1)[Hg]c2ccccc2

Properties
Chemical formula	Hg(C_{6}H_{5})_{2}
Molar mass	354.804 g·mol^{−1}
Appearance	white solid
Density	2.318 g/cm^{3}
Melting point	121 to 123 °C (250 to 253 °F; 394 to 396 K)
Boiling point	204 °C (399 °F; 477 K)
Solubility in water	slightly soluble in ethanol, diethyl ether; soluble in benzene, chloroform

Hazards
- GHS labelling
Pictograms	(GHS06: Toxic) (GHS08: Health hazard) (GHS09: Environmental hazard)
Signal word	Danger
Hazard statements	H300, H310, H330, H373, H410
Precautionary statements	P260, P262, P264, P270, P271, P273, P280, P284, P301+P316, P302+P352, P304+P340, P316, P319, P320, P321, P330, P361+P364, P391, P403+P233, P405, P501
NFPA 704 (fire diamond)	4 1 0

Related compounds
Related compounds	Diphenylzinc; Phenylcopper; Phenylsodium
- Except where otherwise noted, data are given for materials in their standard state (at 25 °C [77 °F], 100 kPa). verify (what is ?) Infobox references

Diphenylmercury is the organomercury compound with the formula Hg(C_{6}H_{5})_{2}. It is a white solid. The compound is of historic interest as a particularly stable organometallic compound but it finds few uses because of its high toxicity.

== Preparation ==
Commercially available, this compound can be prepared by several routes. It results from treating phenylmercury acetate with sodium stannite, by the reaction of mercuric halides with phenylmagnesium bromide, and the reaction of bromobenzene with sodium amalgam.

== Safety ==
Diphenylmercury is highly toxic.
