= Tetraphenyllead =

Names
- IUPAC name Tetraphenylplumbane

Identifiers
CAS Number	595-89-1
3D model (JSmol)	Interactive image
ChEBI	CHEBI:30184
ChemSpider	65738
ECHA InfoCard	100.008.976
EC Number	209-871-3
PubChem CID	72906
UNII	2K9SW63R4N
CompTox Dashboard (EPA)	DTXSID20208203
- InChI: InChI=1S/4C6H5.Pb/c4*1-2-4-6-5-3-1;/h4*1-5H; Key: WBJSMHDYLOJVKC-UHFFFAOYSA-N
- SMILES: c1ccccc1[Pb](c2ccccc2)(c3ccccc3)c4ccccc4

Properties
Chemical formula	Pb(C_{6}H_{5})_{4}
Molar mass	515.6 g·mol^{−1}
Appearance	white powder
Density	1.53 g/cm^{3}
Melting point	227–228 °C
Boiling point	270 °C (decomposes)
Solubility in water	insoluble
Solubility	benzene 15.4 g/L dioxane 11.4 g/L carbon tetrachloride 8.04 g/L

Hazards
- Occupational safety and health (OHS/OSH)
Main hazards	May cause damage to the organs and the unborn child
- GHS labelling
Pictograms	(GHS06: Toxic) (GHS07: Exclamation mark) (GHS08: Health hazard) (GHS09: Environmental hazard)
Signal word	Danger
Hazard statements	H301, H302, H311, H331, H332, H360, H373, H410
Precautionary statements	P203, P260, P262, P264, P270, P271, P273, P280, P301+P316, P301+P317, P302+P352, P304+P340, P316, P317, P318, P319, P321, P330, P361+P364, P391, P403+P233, P405, P501
Flash point	126 °C (13 mmHg)

Related compounds
Other anions	Tetramethyllead; Tetraethyllead; Tetrabutyllead
Other cations	Tetraphenylmethane; Tetraphenylsilane; Tetraphenylgermanium; Tetraphenyltin
- Except where otherwise noted, data are given for materials in their standard state (at 25 °C [77 °F], 100 kPa). Infobox references

Tetraphenyllead is an organolead compound with the chemical formula Pb(C_{6}H_{5})_{4} or PbPh_{4}. It is a white solid.

== Preparation ==
Tetraphenyllead can be produced by the reaction of phenylmagnesium bromide and lead(II) chloride in diethyl ether. This was the method first used by P. Pfeiffer and P. Truskier to produce tetraphenyllead in 1904.

(C_{6}H_{5})MgBr + 2 PbCl_{2} → Pb(C_{6}H_{5})_{4} + Pb + 4 MgBrCl

== Reactions ==
A solution of hydrogen chloride in ethanol can react with tetraphenyllead and substitute some of the phenyl groups to chlorine atoms:

Pb(C_{6}H_{5})_{4} + HCl → Pb(C_{6}H_{5})_{3}Cl + C_{6}H_{6}
Pb(C_{6}H_{5})_{3}Cl + HCl → Pb(C_{6}H_{5})_{2}Cl_{2} + C_{6}H_{6}

Just like tetrabutyllead, tetraphenyllead and sulfur react explosively at 150 °C and produce diphenyl sulfide and lead(II) sulfide:

Pb(C_{6}H_{5})_{4} + 3 S → PbS + 2 S(C_{6}H_{5})_{2}

Tetraphenyllead reacts with iodine in chloroform to produce triphenyllead iodide.

== Safety ==
Tetraphenyllead may damage fertility or the unborn child, to organs through prolonged or repeated exposure (kidneys, male gonads, liver, central nervous system). It is a possible carcinogen.
