= PMDTA =

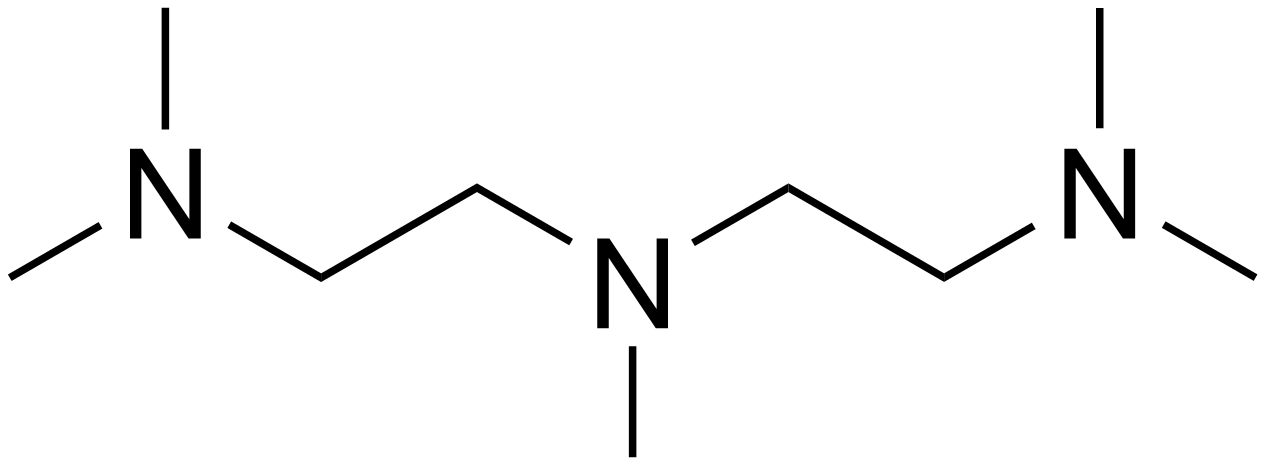
- Skeletal formula of PMDTA

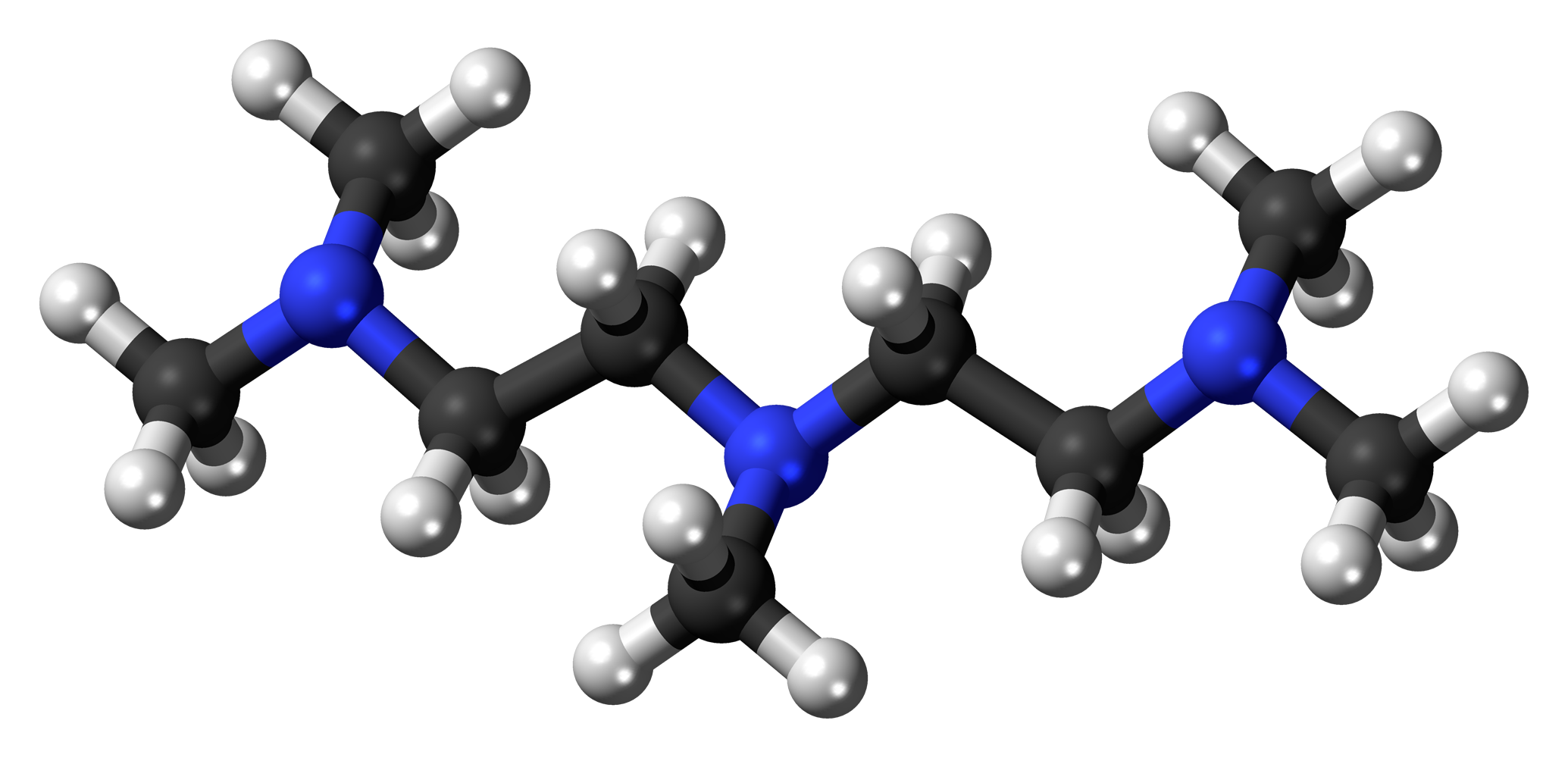
- Ball and stick model of PMDTA

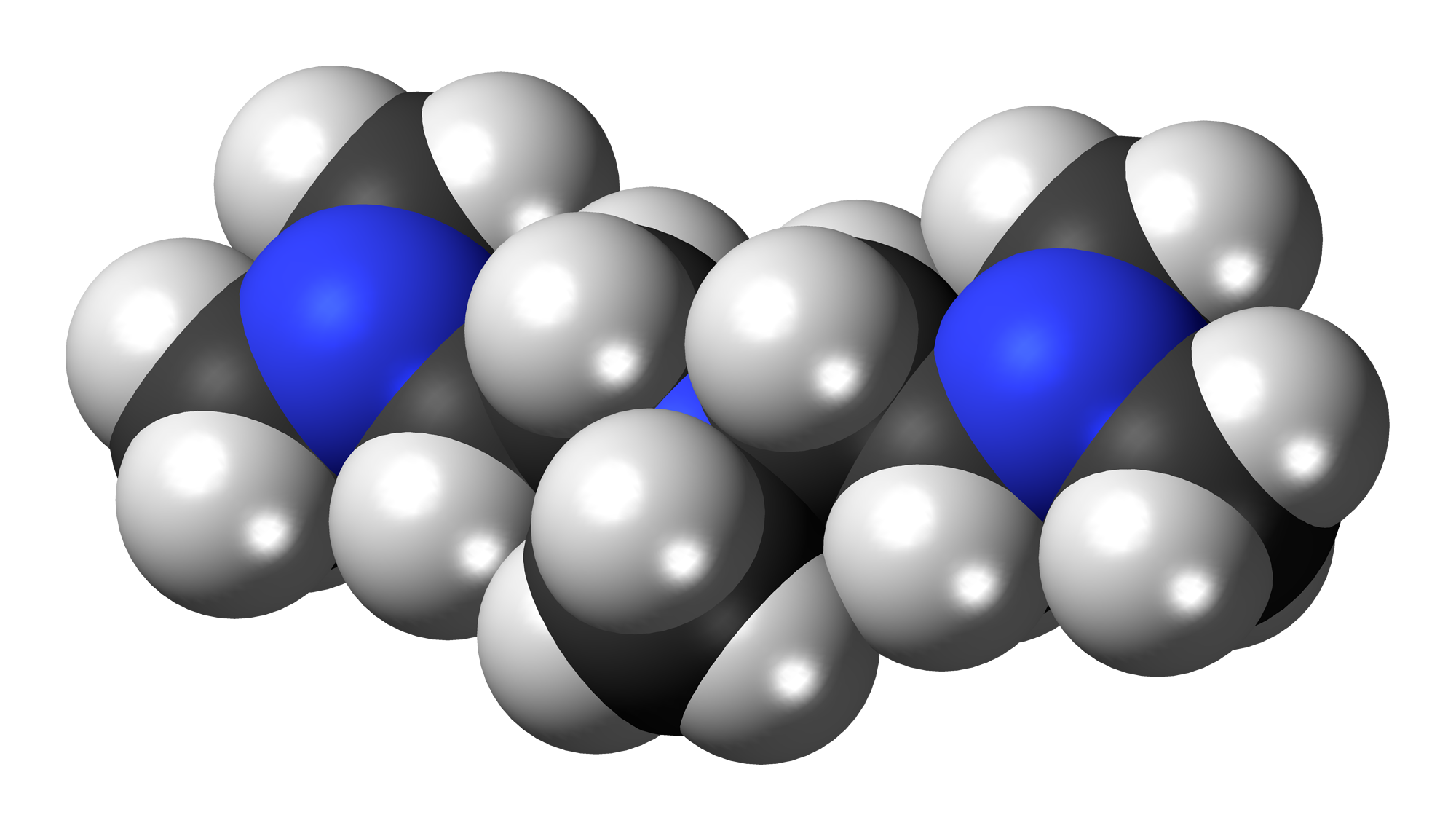
- Spacefill model of PMDTA

Names
- Preferred IUPAC name N^{1}-[2-(Dimethylamino)ethyl]-N^{1},N^{2},N^{2}-trimethylethane-1,2-diamine

Identifiers
CAS Number	3030-47-5
3D model (JSmol)	Interactive image
Beilstein Reference	1741396
ChEBI	CHEBI:39475
ChemSpider	17187
ECHA InfoCard	100.019.275
EC Number	221-201-1
Gmelin Reference	27747
PubChem CID	18196
RTECS number	IE2100000
UNII	3274UTY3HL
UN number	2734
CompTox Dashboard (EPA)	DTXSID7029249
- InChI: InChI=1S/C9H23N3/c1-10(2)6-8-12(5)9-7-11(3)4/h6-9H2,1-5H3 Key: UKODFQOELJFMII-UHFFFAOYSA-N
- SMILES: CN(C)CCN(C)CCN(C)C

Properties
Chemical formula	C_{9}H_{23}N_{3}
Molar mass	173.304 g·mol^{−1}
Appearance	Colorless liquid
Odor	Fishy, ammoniacal
Density	830 mg mL^{−1}
Melting point	−20 °C (−4 °F; 253 K)
Boiling point	198 °C (388 °F; 471 K)
Vapor pressure	31 Pa (at 20 °C)
Refractive index (n_{D})	1.442

Hazards
- GHS labelling
Pictograms	(GHS05: Corrosive) (GHS06: Toxic)
Signal word	Danger
Hazard statements	H302, H311, H314
Precautionary statements	P280, P305+P351+P338, P310
Flash point	53 °C (127 °F; 326 K)
Autoignition temperature	155 °C (311 °F; 428 K)
Explosive limits	1.1–5.6%
- Lethal dose or concentration (LD, LC)
LD_{50} (median dose)	232 mg kg^{−1} (dermal, rabbit); 1.351 g kg^{−1} (oral, rat)
Safety data sheet (SDS)	sigmaaldrich.com

Related compounds
Related amines	triethylenetetramine; tmeda; diethylenetriamine; triazacyclononane
- Except where otherwise noted, data are given for materials in their standard state (at 25 °C [77 °F], 100 kPa). verify (what is ?) Infobox references

PMDTA (N,N,N′,N′′,N′′-pentamethyldiethylenetriamine) is an organic compound with the formula [(CH_{3})_{2}NCH_{2}CH_{2}]_{2}NCH_{3}. PMDTA is a basic, bulky, and flexible, tridentate ligand that is used in organolithium chemistry. It is a colorless liquid, although impure samples appear yellowish.

== Synthesis ==
PMDTA is prepared from diethylenetriamine by the Eschweiler-Clarke reaction, involving the use of formaldehyde and formic acid.

(H_{2}N[CH_{2}]_{2})_{2}NH + 5 CH_{2}O + 5 HCO_{2}H → (Me_{2}N[CH_{2}]_{2})_{2}NMe + 5 CO_{2} + 5 H_{2}O

== Comparison with diethylenetriamine ==
Unlike diethylenetriamine, all three amines in PMDTA are tertiary. Both PMDTA and diethylenetriamine are tridentate ligands that form two five-membered chelate rings. The σ-donating properties of the amino groups of diethylenetriamine are greater than that of PMDTA in copper(II) complexes. Both ligands can coordinate metal complexes in arrangements where the three nitrogen centers are co-planar or mutually cis.

== Organolithium compounds and PMDTA ==
PMDTA is used to modify the reactivity of organolithium compounds, which deaggregate in the presence of Lewis bases to enhance their reactivity. Commonly, the ditertiary amine TMEDA is used in these applications; it binds to the lithium center as a bidentate ligand. PMDTA behaves analogously, but since it is tridentate, it binds more strongly to lithium. In contrast to TMEDA, PMDTA forms monomeric complexes with organolithium compounds. Both amines affect the regiochemistry of metalation.

In the PMDTA/n-BuLi adducts, the Li-C bonds are highly polarized, thus increasing the basicity of the butyl group.

The effect of PMDTA on lithium anilide is illustrative of PMDTA's complexing power. The complex, [{PhN(H)Li}_{3}·2PMDTA], is trinuclear, featuring approximately colinear Li^{+} centers that are three-, four-, and five-coordinate. The central three-coordinate lithium atom is not bonded to PMDTA. One of the terminal Li centers is pseudo-tetrahedral in an N_{4} coordination sphere. The other terminal lithium atom is five-coordinate and binds to two anilino N centers and the PMDTA.

== Transition metal and aluminium complexes ==
PMDTA often forms five-coordinate complexes due to steric bulk of the methyl groups. PMDTA stabilize unusual cations. The first cationic derivative of alane, [H_{2}Al(PMDTA)]^{+}[AlH_{4}]^{−} was prepared by treating H_{3}AlNMe_{3} with PMDTA.
