= Phenylcopper =

Names
- Other names: Copper(1+) benzenide; Phenylcopper(I)

Identifiers
CAS Number	3220-49-3
3D model (JSmol)	Interactive image
Abbreviations	PhCu; CuPh
ChemSpider	13322947
PubChem CID	10997120
CompTox Dashboard (EPA)	DTXSID20451156
- InChI: InChI=1S/C6H5.Cu/c1-2-4-6-5-3-1;/h1-5H;/q-1;+1 Key: MKHQMLKDCBPKBC-UHFFFAOYSA-N
- SMILES: C1=CC=[C-]C=C1.[Cu+]

Properties
Chemical formula	C_{6}H_{5}Cu
Molar mass	140.652 g·mol^{−1}
Appearance	Colorless crystals
Solubility in water	reacts with water

Related compounds
Related compounds	Phenyllithium; Phenylsodium; Phenylsilver
- Except where otherwise noted, data are given for materials in their standard state (at 25 °C [77 °F], 100 kPa). Infobox references

Phenylcopper is an organometallic chemical compound of copper. Its chemical formula is C_{6}H_{5}Cu, where copper is in the oxidation state of +1.

== Synthesis ==
Phenylcopper was the first known organocopper compound and was first prepared in 1923 from phenylmagnesium iodide and copper(I) iodide and in 1936 by Henry Gilman by transmetallation of phenylmagnesium iodide with copper(I) chloride.

Phenylcopper can be obtained by reacting phenyl lithium with copper(I) bromide in diethyl ether.

C_{6}H_{5}Li + CuBr → C_{6}H_{5}Cu + LiBr

== Properties ==
Phenylcopper is a colorless solid that is soluble in pyridine. It can be stored for a few days without decomposition under nitrogen or in vacuum. Rapid decomposition takes place in air. Water decomposes phenylcopper to form red copper(I) oxide and varying amounts of benzene and biphenyl. It forms stable complexes with tributylphosphine and triphenylphosphine.

When dissolved in dimethyl sulfide, phenylcopper forms dimers and trimers (aggregates of two or three molecules).

== Related structures ==
A diphenylcuprate(I) ion exists that can form a salt with lithium (lithium diphenylcuprate(I) Li^{+}[Cu(C_{6}H_{5})_{2}]^{−}), an example of a Gilman reagent.
